= Csetneki family =

Hungarian noble family

- Hungarian noble family
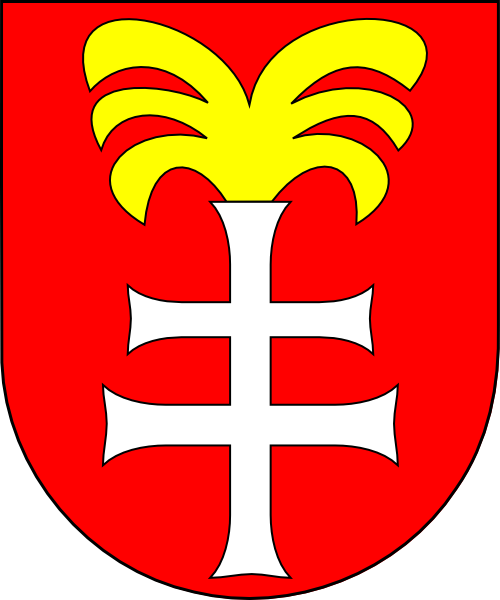
- Parent house: Genus Ákos
- Country: Hungary; Hungary
- Founded: 1318
- Founder: Nicholas I and Ladislaus I
- Final ruler: Francis III
- Dissolution: 1602

The Csetneki (also Chetneky; Slovak: Štítnikovci) family was a noble family in the Kingdom of Hungary, which possessed landholdings mostly around the eponymous settlement Csetnek in Gömör County (present-day Štítnik, Slovakia). The Csetnekis originated from the ancient Hungarian clan gens (clan) Ákos and their closest relatives were the more influential Bebek family. The Csetnekis became extinct in the early 17th century.

== History ==
=== Origin ===
The Csetnekis descended from the Bebek branch of the gens (clan) Ákos. The earliest known ancestor of the branch was Matthew, who lived in the beginning of the 13th century. One of his sons, Derek (I) ("the Bald") served as ispán of Győr County in 1251. Derek and his brother Philip were granted large areas of land in Gömör County by Béla IV of Hungary in 1243, for their bravery during the Mongol invasion. The Pelsőc lordship (today Plešivec, Slovakia) were emerged in the upcoming decades, also belonging the settlement Csetnek. Derek (I) had two sons, Derek (II) and Benedict; the Csetnekis and Bebebks descended from the latter. Benedict's sons concluded a property distribution agreement between each other in 1318. The eldest son Dominic (called with the epithet "Bebek") inherited Pelsőc and the surrounding area, becoming progenitor of the namesake Bebek family, while Benedict's other sons – Nicholas (I) "the Cuman", Ladislaus (I), John (I) and Peter (I) – were granted Csetnek, which functioned already as the family's seat prior to that. Of them, only Nicholas and Ladislaus had descendants, who adopted the Csetneki surname thereafter.

=== During the Angevin period ===
In the first two decades of the 14th century, oligarch Matthew Csák ruled vast areas in the territory of present-day Slovakia, including Gömör County. The Csetnekis' neighbor, Felician Záh was among those lord who swore loyalty to him. However, the Csetnekis resisted against the oligarch's efforts. Therefore, Matthew Csák captured and imprisoned John, one of Benedict's sons, to prevent his brothers from joining the cause of Charles I of Hungary by holding him hostage. Historian Monika Tihányiová considered that this served as a catalyst for the brothers to decide to divide their wealth in February 1318. After his release, John joined the agreement which was transcribed and confirmed in 1320, involving him. In accordance with the contract, Nicholas and Ladislaus acquired the southern and eastern portion of Csetnek, along with the surrounding villages Restér (Roštár), Gecelfalva (Koceľovce), Pétermány (Petrovo), Marcellusfalva (Marcelová), Sebespatak (Rožňavské Bystré), Tornova (Trnová), Tapolca (Kunova Teplica), Ardó (Ardovo), Lekenye (Bohúňovo) and Panyit (Gemerská Panica). Thereafter, Nicholas held his permanent seat in Tapolca, which then adopted his epithet ("the Cuman"), becoming Kuntapolca. Their brothers, John and Peter were granted the western portion of Csetnek, along with the surrounding settlements Ochtina (Ochtiná), Rochfalva (Rochovce), Nagyszlabos (Slavošovce), Gencs (Honce), Gacsalk (Gočaltovo), Rozlozsnya (Rozložná), Somkút, Kövi and its castle (near present-day Rákoš), Nandrás (Nandraž), Vignye and Tarfalva (a predecessor of present-day Rákoš). Instead of a coherent complex of possessions, these estates were located scattered along the rivers Csetnek and Sajó, in addition to the valley of Turóc (Turiec) and the region of Kövi.

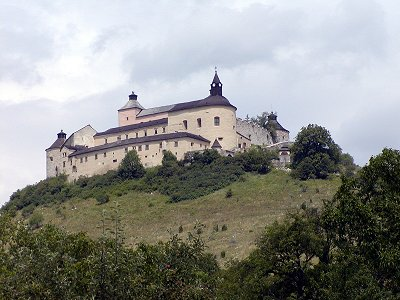
Krásna Hôrka Castle (Krasznahorka), initially jointly possessed by the Csetnekis and the Bebeks until the late 14th century

Benedict's five surviving sons initially supported each other's endeavors. Upon their request, Charles I granted town rights and privileges to Csetnek and Pelsőc (together with the right to hold a fair and to collect customs) in 1328, despite that both settlements were a landlord's property. Both towns were granted only those privileges which guaranteed the maintenance of the Csetneki family's supremacy. For instance, the charter does not mention the free election of parish priests, obligation to pay tithes to the Archdiocese of Esztergom or the determination of the person entitled to adjudicate. The brothers (excluding Dominic) jointly protested against a donation to John Delnei, who was granted Betlér (Betliar) in 1330. However, Delnei was an important familiaris of the Drugeth family, thus Charles I rejected their complaint. Nicholas (I), also representing his brothers, successfully requested the confirmation of King Béla's 1243 royal charter in 1335, in order to defend their interests against the neighboring lords and even the claims of the Bebek family. Charles I intended to donate a large portion of the late Derek's lordship to the Cselenfis (also from the Ákos clan), of which a member John Cselenfi stopped the assassin Felician Záh, who attempted to kill the entire Hungarian royal family. Nicholas and Ladislaus filed a complaint against that decision in 1339. Ladislaus died sometime between 1339 and 1342, and his sons – Nicholas (III) and Ladislaus (II) joined the lawsuit in the latter year.

The Csetnekis, together with the Bebeks, were involved in a series of lawsuits against the Máriássy family over the possessions Berzéte (Brzotín) and Krasznahorka (Krásna Hôrka), which both estates they had lost under unclear circumstances in the late 13th century. The 1348 lawsuit in this issue was the last joint action for the protection of interests within the family members. All descendants protested against the ownership of Nicholas "the Cuman" over Krasznahorka before the palatinal court in 1354. The Bebeks acquired the castle, while Nicholas and his sons were granted its accessories, including the villages Szalóc (Slavec) and Rekenye (Rakovnica). There were also conflicts over the shared use of the lead mine in Ardó. According to the verdict of Ladislaus, John and Peter from 1330, their brothers Dominic Bebek and Nicholas "the Cuman" arbitrarily seized the mine and they produced the lead only for themselves. In 1333, Ladislaus filed a lawsuit against all of his brothers, claiming that they intended to sell Berzéte and Krasznahorka to the Máriássys. Several lawsuits were also filed against Peter by his brothers, who complained that he arbitrarily and alone settled serfs on the border of Csetnek and tried to sell Kövi to Peter Jolsvai from the gens Rátót.

During the Angevin period, the Csetnekis – similarly to other members of the lower nobility – entered the service of powerful lords. John (I) fought in the Austrian–Hungarian War of 1336–1337, where he was captured and held in captivity at least until early 1339. Nicholas (I) was a familiaris of Stephen Lackfi, Voivode of Transylvania. In this capacity, he participated in the royal campaign against the rebellious Croatian nobles in 1345. Peter (I) entered the service of Kónya Szécsényi. In this capacity, he served as vice-ispán of Nógrád County from 1348 to 1350. Simultaneously, Peter also functioned as vice-ispán of Szepes County and (vice)-castellan of its fortress (Spiš) in 1349, under Kónya Szécsényi. He held the latter positions until July 1349, when both the county and the castle were transferred to the fiefdom of Duke Stephen of Anjou, the younger brother of King Louis I of Hungary. Peter participated in the Neapolitan campaign in 1351. His career came to a screeching halt when he came into conflict with the powerful Pásztói (or Hasznosi) family, who originated from the gens Rátót. He was charged of killing one of its members, Stephen after a lengthy dispute. The fine imposed left Peter completely in debt, and even his own family members turned against him in his desperate attempts to raise money.

=== Heyday under Sigismund ===
==== George branch ====
Among members of the third generation, only the branch of Ladislaus (I) survived the early 15th century, since – among the sons of Nicholas (I) "the Cuman" – only Ákos had a son, Michael (I). He and his second cousin George (II), a son of Nicholas (III), were the most prominent members of the kinship in the last decades of the 14th century. They were confidants of Louis I of Hungary and the family members were granted ius gladii by the monarch over the subjects in their estates in 1378. Following the death of Louis in 1382, the Csetnekis supported his daughter Mary, Queen of Hungary and her mother Elizabeth of Bosnia during the internal conflict against Charles III of Naples. In April 1386, George and Michael were granted landholdings in Pest County for their faithful services by Mary. Following the capture of the queen, they swore allegiance to Sigismund, her husband. George and Michael took part in Sigismund's campaign into Croatia and they were present in the siege of Novigrad Castle, where the royal troops liberated Mary in June 1387.

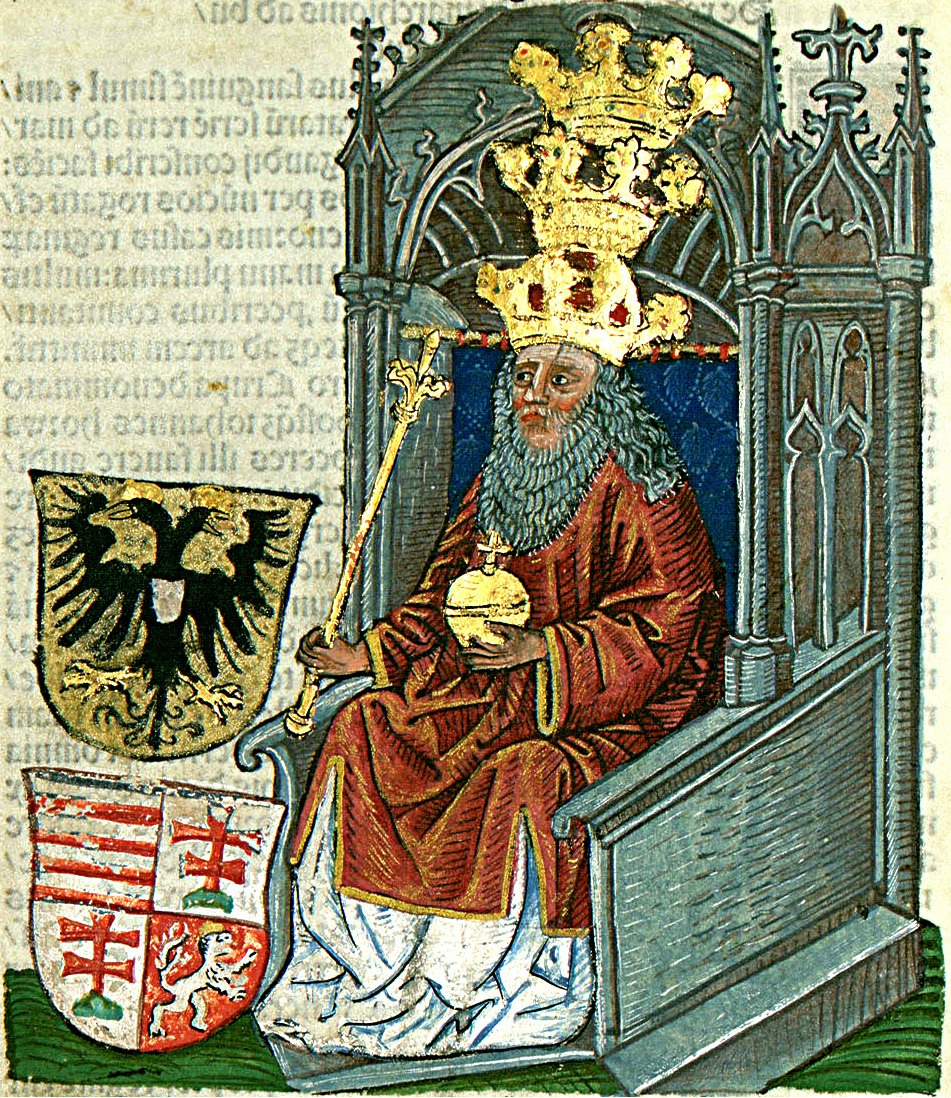
King Sigismund depicted by the Chronica Hungarorum

Following Sigismund was elected co-ruler, George was appointed Master of the stewards in 1387; this was the highest secular position achieved by a member of the Csetneki family. He is mentioned in this capacity from July 1387 to July 1396. A single source from June 1388 also refers to Michael as an office-holder of this royal courtly position. For their former services to Louis I and Mary, George and Michael were granted the royal castle of Szanda with its accessories – portions in Surány, Szanda and Bolhádalja, along with a custom in the village Guta – in Nógrád County by Sigismund in November 1387. However, the king donated the fort to John Pásztói three years later, around 1390. Both of them escorted Sigismund to his military campaigns to the southern border. They fought in the Hungarian–Ottoman War (1389–1396), George was present during the skirmishes against the Ottoman incursions in Temesvár (present-day Timișoara, Romania) in August 1392. It is plausible that George also took part in the disastrous Battle of Nicopolis in September 1396, where his second cousin Michael was killed, ending the line of Nicholas "the Cuman". His distant relatives, the Bebek family arbitrarily seized all of his possessions, including the castle of Kövi. His second cousins, Ladislaus (IV), Nicholas (V) and John (III) complained to the royal court against this in August 1401. Following Michael's death, his relatives were unable to pay the dowry of his widow Clara, thus they were forced to pledge their portions in Tapolca (Kunova Teplica), Szalóc (Slavec) and Ardó (Ardovo) in November 1401.

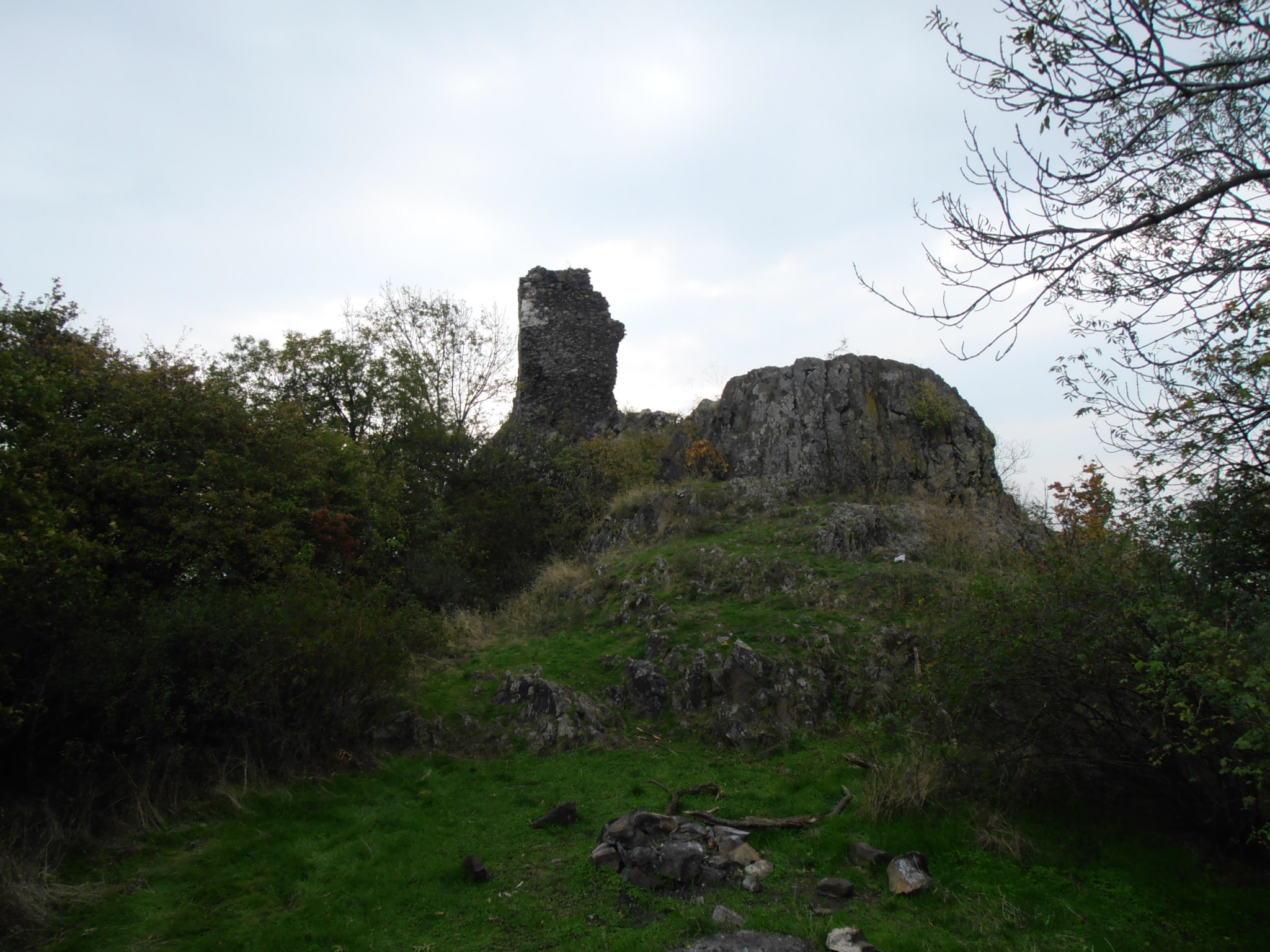
The ruins of the castle of Szanda in Hungary, briefly possessed by the Csetnekis

George survived the Crusade of Nicopolis, but he was replaced as Master of the stewards. Thereafter, he served as ispán of Gömör County from 1397 until his death; he is first mentioned in this capacity in September 1399. He was granted the castle of Saskő (today ruins near Šášovské Podhradie) from Sigismund in 1396. Because of his frequent travels with Sigismund, Pope Boniface IX permitted him to use his own portable altar with clerical staff in his papal letter issued in June 1397, which was a significant privilege for a nobleman in the late 14th century. The ailing George compiled his last will and testament in Csetnek on 31 July 1402. In the document, George bequeathed his all purchased and pledged property to his wife and daughter Catherine, with the stipulation that after the death of both of them the estates would belong to his son, Sigismund (II) and his descendants. George died shortly thereafter.

George's branch became extinct by 1420. He had two children, Sigismund (II) and Catherine. The young Sigismund, who was named after the monarch and was the godson of him, belonged to the opposition group which organized a plot against the namesake king in 1401. Slovak historian Monika Tihányiová argued that George left him out of his will – excluding the village Csákány – because of this, but since he was his only son, he did not definitively exclude him from the inheritance. He was also involved in the conspiracy against King Sigismund in 1403, as a result his estate in Szentfalva (a former village in the territory of present-day Budapest) was confiscated. Sigismund married Dorothea Dunajeci. After 1403, Sigismund swore loyalty to the king and belonged to the young noble courtiers, as he was styled in this form from 1406 to 1402. The king donated the castle of Hrussó in exchange for Saskő to Sigismund in 1409. In the subsequent years, he and his castellan Andrew Szepesi were frequently involved in conflicts with their neighbors, including the Garamszentbenedek Abbey. Sigismund (II) died without descendants sometime between 1418 and 1420. George's daughter, Catherine married Ladislaus Ostfi de Asszonyfalva from the gens Osl. She compiled her last will and testament in the manor of Csetnek in 1433. As a childless lady, she bequeathed her jewelry, clothes and other stuff to the brothers of her late husband, the Csetneki family, the local parish church and her servants.

==== Ladislaus branch ====
After the death of George (II) in 1402, their cousins, the sons of Ladislaus (II) took control of the family. One of them, Ladislaus (IV), who studied the University of Vienna, entered ecclesiastical career and became the most influential member of the Csetnekis. He was elected canon of Esztergom by 1397, before becoming archdeacon of Hont from 1399 to 1404. He and his brothers belonged to the lesser nobility at that time; they pledged estates to their cousin George, who was dying, for 50 florins. Nicholas (V), John (III) and Ladislaus frequently complained in those years that the Bebeks unlawfully seized large amount of their inherited domains. In 1406 or 1407, Ladislaus was elected archdeacon of Gömör. He elevated into the position of provost of Szentgyörgymező (a provostry in Esztergom), serving in this capacity from 1408 to 1424. He became a skilled diplomat in the royal court of King Sigismund in these years, which resulted in the increase of his family's political influence. Courtesy to him, his three brothers – Nicholas, John and Sigismund – served as courtly knights in the royal household. Nicholas (V) married Helena Deméndi, a lady-in-waiting of Queen Mary in 1389. During the tensions emerged between Hungary and Poland, their 40-member lanced troops were assigned to the northern border of the realm, where they stationed at Késmárk (Kežmarok). They were among the many nobles who ratified the Treaty of Lubowla in 1412.

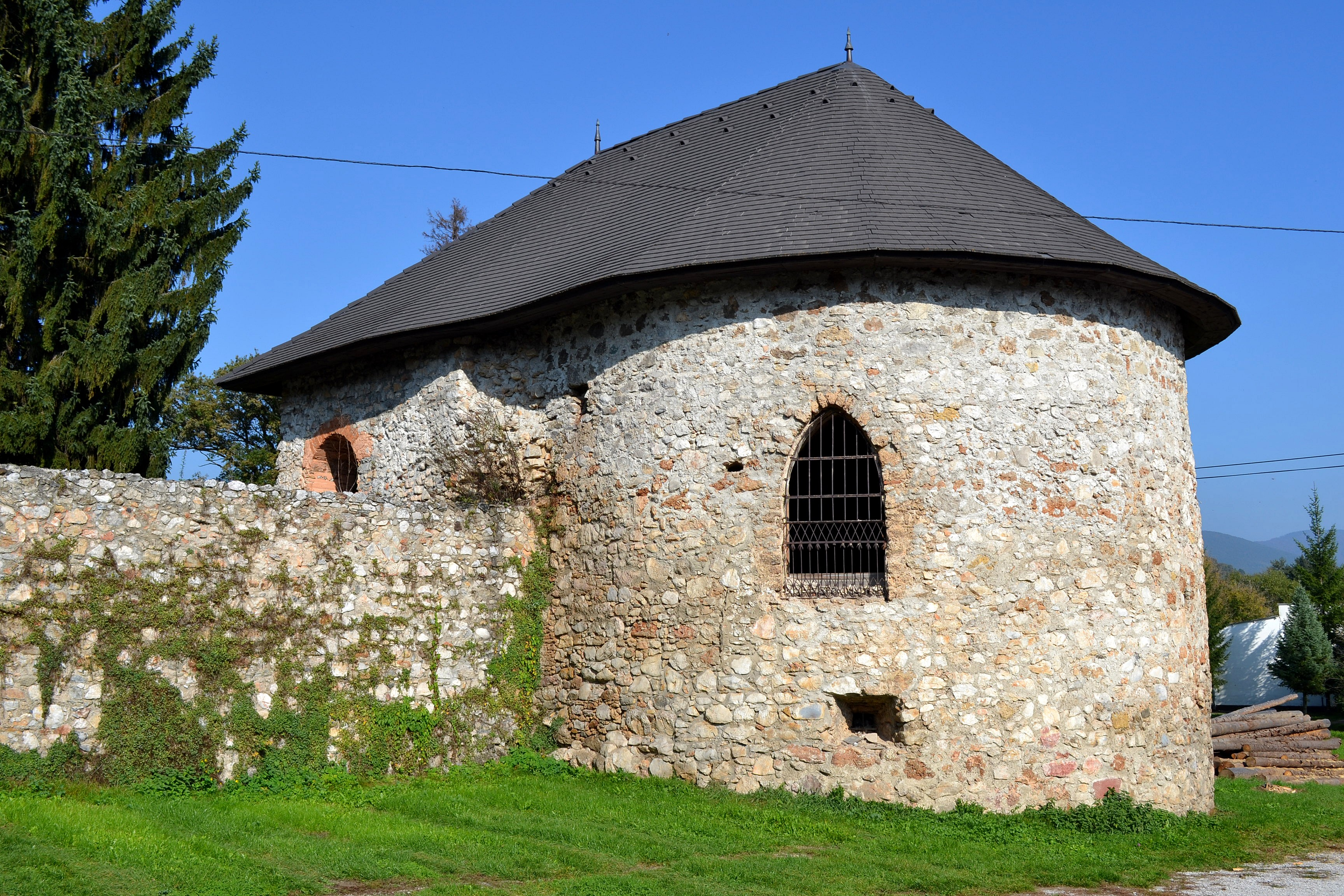
Preserved medieval part of water castle in Štítnik

Ladislaus was styled as vice-chancellor of Sigismund's German (Roman) court (Latin: aule regie maiestatis Romanorum vicecancellarius) in 1414. In this capacity, he attended the Council of Constance staying there for the upcoming years. Duke Albert V of Austria, Sigismund's future son-in-law, appointed Ladislaus as a chaplain of his ducal court in March 1416. He briefly administered the Archdiocese of Esztergom as a gubernator from 1419 to 1420. King Sigismund appointed Ladislaus as the governor of the Stephanite and Knights Hospitaller's monasteries in Esztergom and Budafelhévíz, respectively, on 15 June 1424. He held the office until 1439. Sigismund, using his sovereignty of ius supremi patronatus, decided in 1427 that Ladislaus should be appointed to any bishopric or archbishopric that first became vacant (except for the see of Esztergom). The king also permitted Ladislaus and his brothers to build a castle in their main residence Csetnek in 1432. Since the mid-1420s, Ladislaus became a confidant of Queen Barbara of Cilli, the second spouse of Sigismund. Ladislaus was first styled as (lord) chancellor of the queenly court in April 1430. His deputy was vice-chancellor Wenceslaus. In this capacity, he escorted Sigismund to the Holy Roman Empire and Italy from 1431 to 1433, which resulted the imperial coronation of Sigismund. In August 1433, Ladislaus stayed in Rome, when requested Pope Eugene IV to grant indulgence to those subjects who went on a pilgrimage to one of the seven churches founded by his late father around Csetnek. While serving as chancellor, his brother John also entered the service of Queen Barbara and functioned as castellan of Ajnácskő in 1434. Ladislaus held the dignity of queenly chancellor until the end of 1437, when Sigismund died.

Ladislaus retained his influence in the royal court, when Albert succeeded his father-in-law as King of Hungary in late 1437. Albert, fulfilling the aforementioned wish of the late Sigismund, appointed him Bishop of Nyitra (Nitra). Ladislaus, who succeeded Dénes Szécsi, is first mentioned in this capacity in July 1439. Since the Roman Curia did not acknowledge the supremacy of the Hungarian royal over ecclesiastical affairs, Pope Eugene IV did not confirm Ladislaus' appointment and he was styled as only bishop-elect throughout his episcopal reign. Following the death of Albert in late 1439, a civil war broke out in Hungary, during which Ladislaus supported the aspirations of Queen Elizabeth of Luxembourg in the name of her infant son Ladislaus the Posthumous against the partisans of Vladislaus I. The bishop handed over the episcopal fort of Nyitra to the mercenaries of Elizabeth. John Jiskra of Brandýs took over the command and defense of the castle against the plundering attacks of the pro-Vladislaus neighbors. Ladislaus, however, did not get the castle back even after the parties reached an agreement in 1445, and Nyitra became one of the strongholds of Jiskra's Hussites in Upper Hungary. Ladislaus lost his title of bishop in 1448 and died in 1450.

=== During the Hunyadis and Jagiellons ===
Among the siblings of Bishop Ladislaus, only John (III) had a descendant, Andrew (I) who outlived his father and produced another generation for the Csetneki family. Sometime in the 1440s, this Andrew entered the service of Ladislaus Hédervári, Bishop of Eger, who appointed him castellan of Eger Castle. His lord was a member of the league of Regent John Hunyadi. In this capacity, Andrew fought in the campaign against John Jiskra in 1451, but the Czech commander routed the Hungarian troops near Losonc (Lučenec) on 7 September. During the battle, the Hussites captured both Ladislaus Hédervári and Andrew Csetneki, together with other lords. Jiskra's army, carrying the hostages with them, marched into Northeast Hungary, to the castles of Gede (Hodejov), which he unsuccessfully besieged, then Eger. According to chronicler Johannes de Thurocz, the bishop was ready to hand over the castle in exchange for his release, but the defenders refused to do that. On 24 August 1452, John Hunyadi and John Jiskra concluded a peace treaty at Körmöcbánya (Kremnica); accordingly, Andrew was released in exchange for a ransom of 2,000 golden florins. Thereafter, Andrew returned to Eger serving its castellan until his death in 1465. In this capacity, he participated in numerous campaigns against the Hussites, including the royal campaign of King Matthias Corvinus (son of John Hunyadi) in 1460, who launched his campaign against Jiskra from the castle of Eger in that year. Andrew (I) compiled his last will and testament in 1465. He appointed his lord, Bishop Ladislaus Hédervári and Elizabeth Szilágyi, the mother of Matthias Corvinus, as guardians of his children. During Andrew's permanent stay in Eger, his wife Helena Keresztúri managed the family estates in Gömör County for years. She actively confronted against the Bebeks over the possession rights of the estates following the death of Andrew.

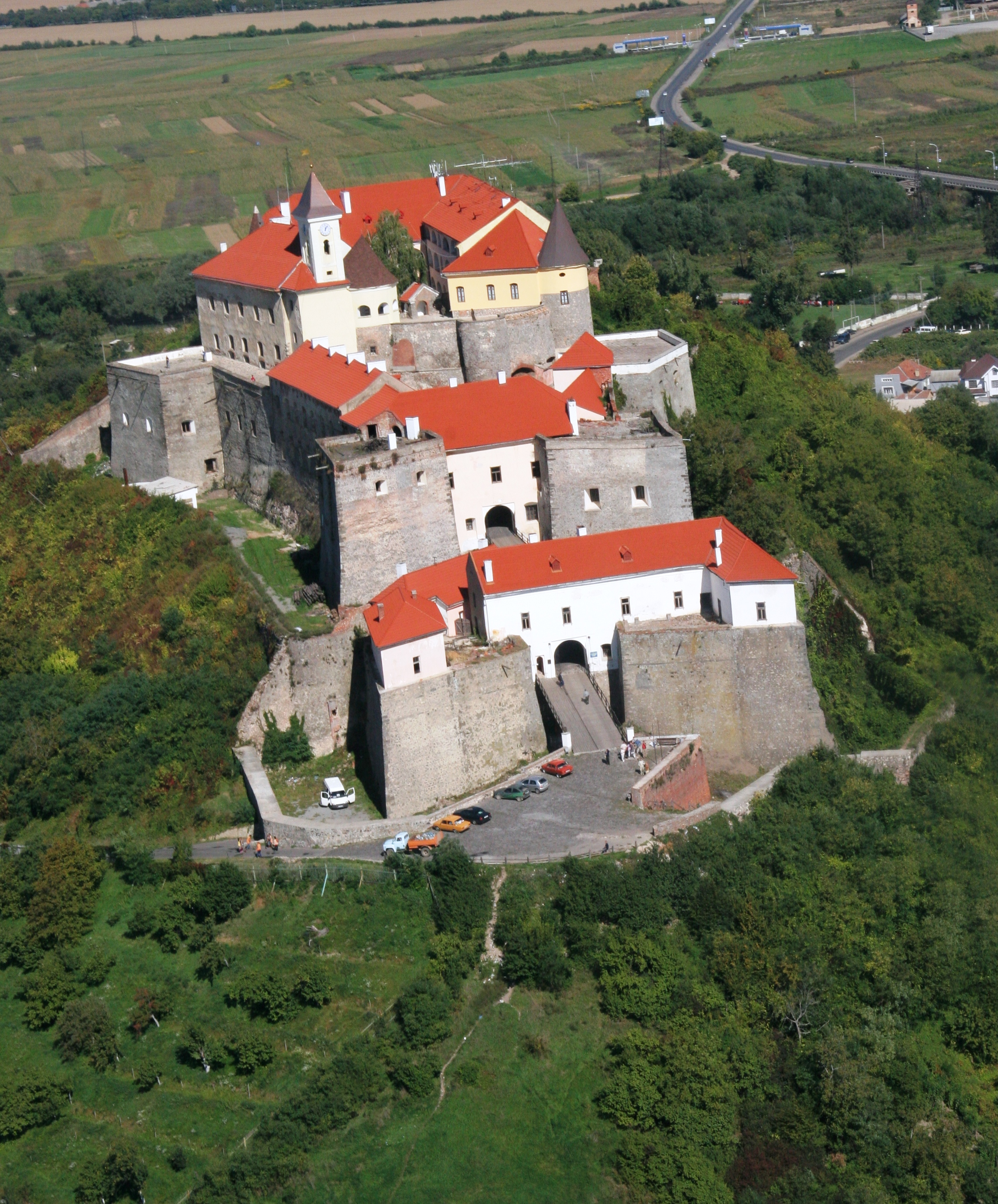
Palanok Castle (Munkács) in present-day Ukraine

The sons of Andrew had to fight over their inheritance (possessions and ore mines) against the Bebeks and their new ally, the powerful Zápolya family. Among them, only John (IV) entered court service. As a familiaris of his former guardian Elizabeth Szilágyi, he served as ispán of Bereg County and castellan of Munkács (present-day Palanok, Ukraine) from 1474 to 1482. The surviving children – Ladislaus (VI), John (IV) and Nicholas (VI) – were confidants of King Matthias Corvinus (son of Elizabeth Szilágyi). Ladislaus (VI) participated in the Siege of Vienna in 1485, leading an own regiment. After the death of Matthias, only John (IV) remained influential in the royal court. After a brief support for pretender John I Albert during the War of the Hungarian Succession, he faithfully served Vladislaus II of Hungary. As a representative of Gömör County, ha attended the national diets in 1492, 1505 and 1507. Despite his court service (he is referred to as a member of the royal council in 1503 and 1506), John had to experience the dissolution of the Csetnek lordship by the end of the 15th century, due to pressure of the powerful Zápolya family, who gradually obtained the possessions of the Bebek family too. He rebuilt the castle of Csetnek into a Renaissance-style fort. John had numerous material conflicts with his own brother Ladislaus, who owed his brother many estates, valuables and sums of money, and lived a lavish lifestyle.

John married Hedwig from an unidentified noble family. Their marriage produced a son, Andrew (II), and two daughters, Dorothea and Catherine. Andrew was mentioned a royal bailiff in 1517. He served as vice-ispán of Gömör County between 1531 and 1533. John's two daughters, Dorothea and Catherine married brothers Ladislaus and Nicholas Lorántfi de Serke from the prestigious gens (clan) Rátót, respectively. John died in 1512, his only son Andrew had no descendants. The heavily indebted Ladislaus married Catherine Bánfi then Anne Cudar. Later generations of the Csetneki family descended from him. His son, Bernard entered the service of Vladislaus II too. He unsuccessfully claimed the maternal inheritance of Ónod lordship for himself. He attended the national diet in 1511.

=== Decline during the Ottoman wars ===
Following the Battle of Mohács (1526), when the medieval state of Hungary collapsed, Sigismund (III) and Peter (IV) – sons of Nicholas (VI) – supported the claim of John Zápolya for the Hungarian throne. For this, Sigismund was captured by the partisans of rival claimant Ferdinand I in 1533. He was freed for the intercession of Johann Katzianer. During the tumultuous years, Peter (IV) became a robber baron leading plundering raids in the Gömör (Gemer) and Szepes (Spiš) regions. His gang of robbers attacked and looted the town Szomolnok (Smolník) in 1539. The local authorities of Szepes County soon broke up the gang, capturing Peter too, who was imprisoned in Szepes Castle. However, Peter successfully escaped with the help of a rope, but soon again captured by local peasants in Lőcse (Levoča). He was imprisoned in the castle of Sáros (Šariš) where he was plausibly executed in the same year. His widow Barbara is mentioned in 1539.

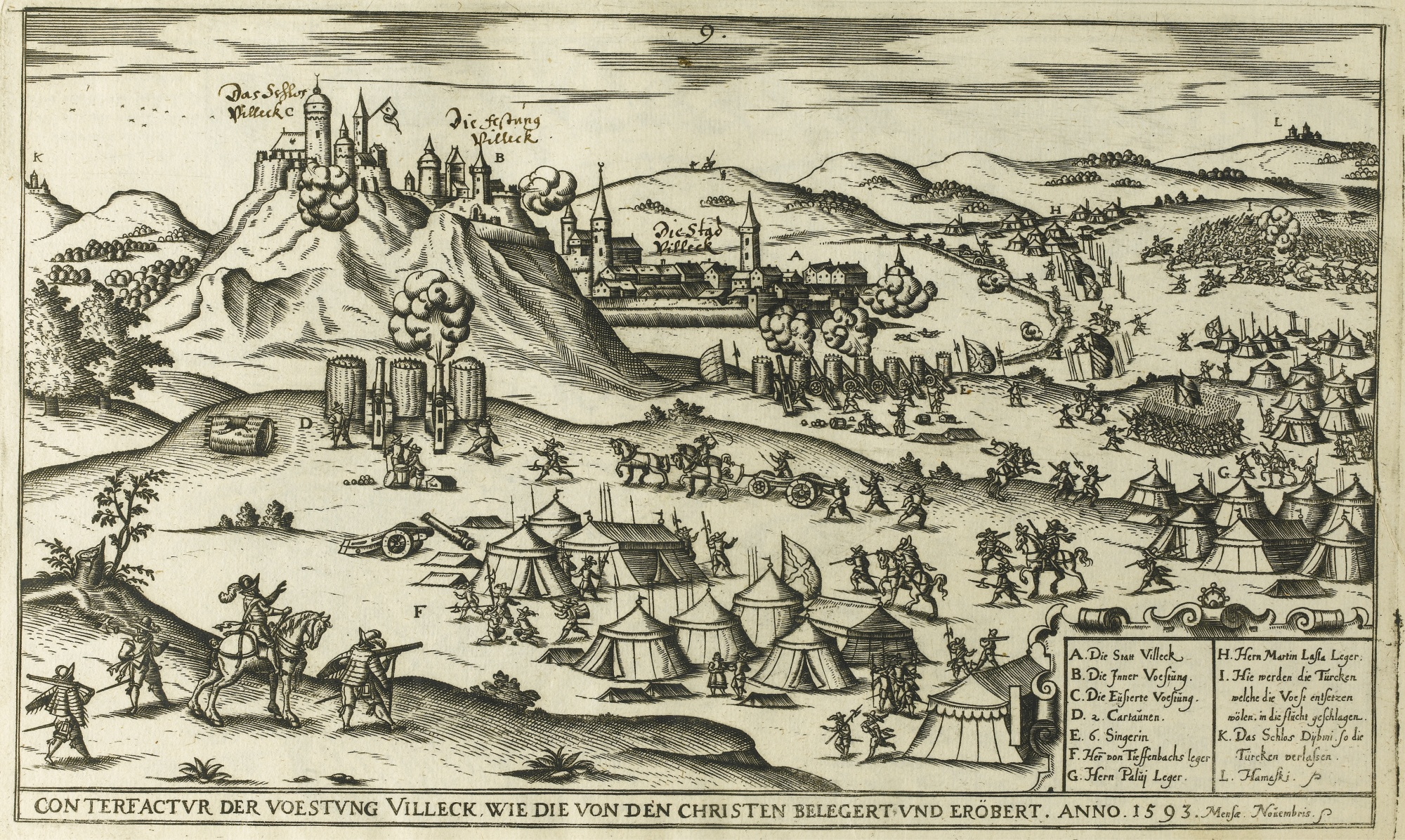
The reconquest of the castle Fülek (Fiľakovo) in 1593, by Abraham Ortelius

Ladislaus (VII), the son of Bernard took over the family headship in the 1540s. It is plausible he supported the Zápolyas too, because Ferdinand confiscated his estates Dobsina (present-day Dobšiná, Slobakia) and other possessions in Csetnek to him and handed those over to Blaise Horváth in 1556. However, because of the chaotic circumstances, the king could not enforce this order and Ladislaus remained landowner of the aforementioned estates. In that year, the army of George Bebek attacked the town Csetnek, Ladislaus was deprived of his property and briefly imprisoned. Shortly after, they reconciled and the Bebeks returned the estates to him. George Bebek, also recruiting Ottoman marauders, advanced from Csetnek to besiege and capture Murány, which proved to be unsuccessful. The Habsburg mercenaries of Murány carried out a retaliatory attack against Csetnek. The contiguous lordship of the Csetnekis around the town gradually disintegrated, the related families (e.g. Lorántfis) carved out more and more estates for themselves. In 1569, King Maximilian instructed the Szepes Chamber (Zipser Kammer) to deliver Csetnek's annual tax (607 golden florins) to Ladislaus in order to strengthen the defense of the castle against continuous Ottoman incursions. Ladislaus was last mentioned as a living person in 1576.

Among the sons of Ladislaus (VII), Andrew (IV) is referred to as a juryman of Gömör County from 1578 to 1580. He entered the service of Stephen Báthory, King of Poland. He was captain of the Hungarian garrison in the castle of Newel at the Polish–Russian border in December 1580, after its capture. King Rudolph confirmed the right of ownership of the castles Csetnek and Dobsina, in addition to other possessions in Gömör, Torna and Borsod counties to Michael (III) and Stephen (II) in 1582, since Peter Andrássy, the newly appointed captain of the royal castle of Krasznahorka, an important stronghold against the Ottoman incursions, jeopardized the Csetnekis' interests. In 1585, they protested against Andrássy's appointment (they claimed the castle themselves after the extinction of the Bebek family in 1567). In 1589, Andrássy petitioned to Rudolph to attach the remaining Csetnek lordship to his fort. After the death of Michael in 1588, Stephen (II) remained the last living adult member of the Csetneki family. Stephen played an important role in the family's conversion into Lutheranism in the last decade of the 16th century. He bravely defended the fort of Csetnek against the Ottoman occupation attempts. Under his supervision, the Csetnekis and Lorántfis reconciled in 1592. He fought in the early stage of the Long Turkish War, during the reconquest of Fülek (Fiľakovo) in 1593. Following his death in 1594 (probably due to war injury), his nephew, the minor Francis (III) was the only male member of the family, he was raised by his maternal relatives, the brothers of his late mother, Anne Máriássy. Francis died in late 1602, ending the Csetneki family after nearly three hundred years. Their closest relatives, the Máriássys and Lorántfis fought each other for their heritage in the next year.

== Family relationships ==
=== Relations with the Bebeks ===
Throughout the centuries, the Csetnekis had turbulent relationship with their closest relatives, the more powerful Bebek family, which provided several magnates and prelates to the realm during its existence. According to Monika Tihányiová, the Bebeks continuously attempted to seize those mineral resource deposits (mines) which laid in the territory of the Csetnek lordship. Consequently, the relationship of the two families is characterized by series of conflicts.

Coat-of-arms of the Bebek family

In 1333, Stephen I Bebek arbitrarily drove parish priest Benedict out of Pelsőc and appointed his successor to head the local St. George church. Ladislaus (I) Csetneki protested against this before the sub-deacon of Gömör, referring to the common right of patronage over the church within the extended kinship. Despite that Stephen Bebek was able to enforce his will and, in the same time, collaborated with the brothers of Ladislaus in order to sell Berzéte and Krasznahorka to the Máriássys. After 1335, when Charles I intended to donate a large portion of the late Derek's lordship to the Cselenfis, the Bebeks and Csetnekis cooperated each other to reach a satisfactory decision for everyone. For instance, the Cselenfis acquired a portion in Vámos (an important stronghold of the Bebeks), therefore the Csetnekis compensated Stephen Bebek with estates in Bihar County and Somkút in Gömör County. In 1336, a single charter refers to the sons of the late Dominic (I) Bebek as "filii Dominici dicti Bebek de Chethnuk", so at that time the history of the two families had not yet been separated in the public consciousness. The Bebeks and Csetnekis jointly built a mill and a manor along the river Sajó (near Lekenye).

The two families possessed jointly the castle of Krasznahorka after 1352. Two years later, Ladislaus (II) complained that his uncle Nicholas "the Cuman" and his sons handed over the fort to the Bebeks. This led to a series of lawsuits over the division of the estates surrounding the castle. According to an agreement in 1357, both families expressed their respect for the 1320 agreement regarding the division of the estates. The Bebeks, however, claimed the estates that remained unoccupied after the childless deaths of John (I) and Peter (I) Csetneki in 1358 and 1367, respectively. The main controversy was sparked by the ownership of Kövi Castle. The Csetnekis had to fight against Stephen I Bebek, and his brothers George I and Bishop Dominic II, who rose to the highest dignities in the court of Louis I of Hungary. The death of Michael (I) in 1396 also caused an inheritance dispute over portions in Kövi and Krasznahorka, as well as right of patronage over the Gombaszög monastery. Throughout from 1408 to 1567, the dispute, characterized by arbitrary occupations and clashes, was constant over the possession of the ore mines at Dobsina between the two families. In addition to all this, there were also sporadic collaborations in the same period. The Bebeks interceded with Sigismund in Cremona in 1414 to mitigate the punishment of Nicholas (V) and his wife Helena Deméndi after a lost lawsuit as possessors of Szolcsány (Solčany). There are also reports in the 1420s, that some members of the Csetnekis (the brothers of Bishop Ladislaus) and the Bebeks jointly pillaged the estates of the Archdiocese of Esztergom near Rozsnyó (Rožňava).

Coat-of-arms of the Zápolya family

During the 1440–1450s civil war period in Hungary, the Bebeks suffered heavy human losses (Emeric III Bebek was killed in the Battle of Kosovo in 1448 and Stephen III Bebek perished in the Battle of Losonc against the Hussites in 1451), thus their raids against the Csetnekis were halted. Helena Keresztúri, the wife of Andrew (I) tried to enforce her family's claim with the same method and seized portions in Dobsina at the expense of the Bebeks. Following a lawsuit, Paul Bebek and Andrew Csetneki reconciled with each other in 1464. Andrew died in the next year, leaving behind his widow and minor children. The Bebeks took advantage of this situation and committed numerous injustices against the economic interests of the Csetnekis in Dobsina, Sajó (Nižná Slaná) and Feketepatak (Kobeliarovo). Ursula, the daughter of Paul Bebek married Emeric Zápolya, an influential official of King Matthias. The Bebek–Zápolya common interest jeopardized the Csetnekis' possessions. Paul Bebek and his familiares attacked Csetnek in 1466. The two families concluded another agreement in 1470. Despite that, another attack occurred against the town in 1471. The Bebeks also plundered Csetnek and Dobsina in 1475. Emeric Zápolya constantly hindered the Csetnekis' ore production in the latter place in the 1470s. Both Ladislaus (VI) and John (IV) filed a complaint against him to the court of King Matthias. The clashes between the Csetnekis and Bebeks (supported by the Zápolyas) in the aforementioned places continued in the first decade of the 16th century.

=== Marriage policy ===
The Csetnekis entered into marriages that brought them into relationship with most noble families in Gömör, Szepes and Torna counties. It is plausible that Benedict's unidentified wife originated from the gens Rátót. Benedict's unidentified daughter married Nicholas from the clan Kacsics (or Kačić) in 1290, in accordance with the mediation of Andrew, Bishop of Eger in the serious conflicts between the Kacsics and Rátót kinship. The Kacsics was a powerful family which possessed domains in Nógrád County. Benedict's another daughter, Anne married Nicholas Forgács, founder of the House of Forgách from the powerful Hont-Pázmány clan (the son of Andrew II Hont-Pázmány). In 1307, her father and brothers donated a portion in Panyit to the couple. After the death of Nicholas Forgács sometime before 1333, Anne married John Leányfalvi from the ancient Hungarian clan Örsúr. She was involved in a lawsuit for her daughters' quarter against her maternal relative, Ladislaus Tari of the Rátót clan, ispán of Heves County, in 1348. Benedict's other unidentified daughter married Roland Szalonnai, who, as the son of Stephen originated from the Tekes (Tekus) kinship, a dominant power in Torna and Sáros counties. The fourth daughter Catherine married Tombold, a local landowner from Szkáros (Skerešovo) in Gömör County. She handed over her daughter's quarter to her nephews – Ákos, George (I) and Ladislaus (II) –, who took proper care of her after she was widowed.

Ladislaus (II) married Helena Szalonnai, a daughter of the aforementioned Roland and his second wife, Scholastica Kajol de Somos. In the following decades, numerous lawsuits were filed over Helena's estates between the Csetnekis and Szalonnais. It is possible that Ladislaus had a first wife – Elizabeth Derencsényi from the gens Balog – before his marriage with Helena. The daughter of John (I) married Peter Jolsvai (or Gedei) from the gens Rátót, they were progenitors of the Jolsvai family which became extinct in 1427. John struggling with financial difficulties pledged his inherited land Gacsalk to his son-in-law in 1349. This loan was still a topic of conversation in 1436, when Helena Jolsvai sent a letter to her distant relative Ladislaus (IV) Csetneki, then administrator of the Knights Hospitaller's monasteries in Budafelhévíz, in this subject. Catherine, the only known daughter of Nicholas (I) "the Cuman" married James Farkasfalvi, a neighboring lord in Szepes County. She and her son Nicholas demanded her daughter's quarter from her nephew Michael (I) Csetneki in 1378.

Michael (I) married first to Margaret Serkei, the daughter of Judge royal John Serkei. Following her death, he married Clara Zsámboki, the daughter of Master of the treasury John Zsámboki, and thus a granddaughter of Palatine Nicholas Zsámboki. Palatine Nicholas Kont married another Clara, a sister of John Zsámboki. At that time, the Csetnekis were important confidants of Queen Mary. One of them, Nicholas (V) married Helena Deméndi (or Damjáni), a lady-in-waiting of the queen in 1389. Mary donated the estate Szolcsány to the newlywed couple in that year, as a wedding gift. They were landowners there until their death in the 1430s. In addition to his sons, Ladislaus (II) also had a daughter Elizabeth, who married John Kazai, who originated from another branch of the gens Rátót. Among the children of Ladislaus, the marriage of John (III) was the most prestigious; his wife was Clara Nagymihályi from the gens Kaplon, which possessed lands in Northeast Hungary, mainly Ung and Zemplén counties. Future members of the Csetnekis ascended from them. George (II) had two children, Sigismund (II) and Catherine. Sigismund married Dorothea Dunajeci from an extended kinship in Szepes County. In 1415, he intended to pledge his estates to his wife, but his relatives objected against this. After the death of Sigismund around 1420, Dorothea used her deceased husband's estates, which the Csetnekis – the sons of Ladislaus (II) – protested against and urged the lady to receive her dowry. George's daughter, Catherine married Ladislaus Ostfi from the gens Osl, which possessed lands in Transdanubia and Northwestern Hungary.

John's daughters married into influential families. Elizabeth was the wife of Daniel Kátai, a scion of a family which held large estates in Pest County in Central Hungary. Their descendants claimed for Csetneki estates even in 1548. John's another daughter, Helena married John Debrői from the powerful gens Aba. He was the son of royal treasurer Stephen Debrői. Their marriage remained childless, and the Debrői family became extinct by the second half of the 15th century. Helena was widowed by 1439. Then she tried to keep her own share of the property against the Csetneki and Szalonnai lords, since the Debrői possessions escheated to the crown. The wife of Andrew (I) was the aforementioned Helena Keresztúri from a relatively unknown family. Her first husband Ladislaus Nagymihályi died without descendants in 1449, which resulted in the extinction of his family. She remarried castellan Andrew in the early 1450s. Helena inherited the pledged estates of her first wife. Some neighboring lords seized those in Csanád and Temes counties (portions in altogether 45 settlements), thus Helena filed a complaint to the cathedral chapter of Eger against them in 1462, without the participation of her second husband Andrew, who resided in Eger. In his absence, Helena managed the Csetneki estates for years. After the death of Andrew in 1465, Helena resolutely defended the Csetneki estates against the claims of Bebeks, while their children were still minors. She strongly opposed the agreement between the Bebeks and Zápolyas, according to which the latter inherit the estate of any Bebek family member who dies without a male heir.

Regarding the next generation, only the full names of two wives of Ladislaus (VI) are known; Catherine Bánfi de Losonc (from the gens Tomaj) and Anne Cudar de Ónod. Catherine had to fight for her own heritage against her brothers, who sold her portion causing to Catherine a damage of 3,000 golden florins. Francis (I), the son of Ladislaus (VI) and Catherine tried to acquire property from the lordship of Sólyomkő in Bihar County (today ruins near Aleșd, Romania) in 1479, which was a part of the heritage of his mother and maternal grandmother. The widow of Francis (I) – Catherine from an unidentified family – wanted to obtain her deceased husband's maternal inheritance in Kraszna County in 1523. The second spouse of Ladislaus (VI), Anne Cudar also came from an important family. Her father was James Cudar, who served as Master of the cupbearers from 1453 to 1454. Anne was the last living member of the Cudar family after 1470, and the family estates escheated to the crown. She desperately demanded her heritage from possessions in Abaúj and Szabolcs counties against the new landowners even in 1492 and 1501, in the name of her children, Bernard, John (V) and Susanna. Both Ladislaus (VI) and Bernard unsuccessfully claimed the castle of Ónod in 1503 and 1511, respectively.

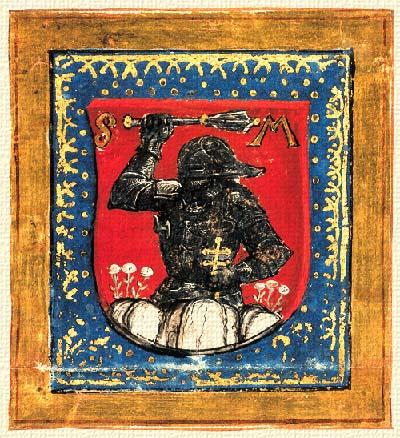
16th-century coat-of-arms of the Máriássy family

John married Hedwig from an unidentified noble family. John's two daughters, Dorothea and Catherine married brothers Ladislaus and Nicholas Lorántfi de Serke from the Rátót clan, respectively. In the autumn of 1505, John complained to Judge royal Peter Szentgyörgyi that his son-in-law Nicholas Lorántfi neglected his wife and children (i.e. John's daughter and grandsons) and his drinking and gluttony put him in a serious financial situation, thus he attempted to pledge his family estates to his brother Ladislaus. John appears in contemporary record in 1512 as a guardian of his grandson Tobias Lorántfi (a son of the late Ladislaus and Dorothea), when he attempted to buy the castle of Gede from the Lorántfis for 4,000 golden florins. After the death of her husband, Dorothea married Stephen Szentannai. His another daughter Catherine died prior to 1520. An unidentified daughter of Nicholas (VI) married Caspar Szkárosi.

Ladislaus (VII), the son of Bernard, married Anne Dévényi who came from a noble family in Gömör County, then Anne Kenderesi. The last generations of the Csetnek family became related with the Máriássy, Görgey, Szécsi and Monoky families, all of them were landowners in Gömör County. The Máriássys dominated the life of the Csetnekis' last generation – centered around the wedding of Michael (III) and Anne Máriássy. Both families were affiliated with the Báthory family in the 1570s. Francis (II) married Sarah Szécsi, a sister of skilled military leader Andrew Szécsi, who was heavily involved in the fights against the Ottomans as the castellan of Murány. Andrew (IV) married Susanna Báthory from the Szaniszlófi branch, a distant relative of the namesake King of Poland. Anne Zeleméry, the spouse of Stephen (II) also descended from the Gutkeled clan, as well as the Báthorys. Unlike her husband, she was Roman Catholic. Sophia, a daughter of Ladislaus (VII) married Christopher Görgey, a member of Saxon-origin influential family from Szepes family. Christopher, who was Lutheran, served as vice-ispán of that county from 1567 to 1570, from 1574 to 1580 and from 1585 to 1588. Anne, a daughter of Michael (III) married Nicholas Monoki, last male member of the family after the early death of their son John. Their only daughter Anne married Matthias (II) Andrássy, who then inherited all Monoki and significant amount of former Csetneki estates, thus the Andrássy family became the new dominant power in the Upper Gömör region, reuniting a contiguous and coherent area.

== Wealth ==
=== Their lordship ===
==== Settlement activity ====
The initial lordship (from 1243), with its centre Pelsőc, was bordered from the northeast by the confluence of two rivers Szomolnok and Gölnic, while its southern border was determined by the confluence of the Sajó and Murány rivers. The border points in the east were the Csremosnó stream, and in the west the East Turóc (Turiec) stream and its tributaries. In 1243, Derek and Philip Ákos were also granted the lordship of Berzéte, of which Krasznahorka and Rozsnyó included (however, under unclear circumstances, the Ákos clan lost these estates still in the 13th century), in addition to some former accessories of the royal castle of Gömör, including Kövi and Lice (Licince). Derek began to populate his extensive lordship with German settlers in the second half of the 13th century. The names of the newly mentioned settlements (e.g. Ochtina, Pétermány or Gacsalk) from the 1318 and 1320 treaties reflect that there were founded by German (Saxon) settlers decades ago, under schultheiß officials invited by Derek and his sons.

After the 13th century antecedents from their ancestors, the Csetnekis continued to populate the settlements they owned with labor. When Dominic Bebek handed over the northern portion of the lordship (where the Dobsina stream flows into the Sajó river) to his brother Ladislaus (I) in 1326, the settlement of the area began with the founding of new villages. Nicholas (I) issued a charter in this issue in 1331, allowing a certain Martin to found a new village in the area of the forest called Araniz with the same privileges that Csetnek had. Among others, Nicholas granted 14-year tax exemption to the settlers. This mining village (then known as Aranyas) is identical with present-day Markuška (Márkuska). Around the same time, Ladislaus (I) permitted Nicholas, son of Radislav to establish another village called Dobsina in 1326, which later became one of the most important centers of mining and economic activity for the Csetnekis. Dobsina was founded under the "Korpona law" (today Krupina), and soon Saxon settlers arrived to populate it. Their privileges included 16-year tax exemption and free choice of priest. In 1334, Ladislaus (I) complained that Nicholas could not cope with the task and ran away. Nevertheless, the settlement was already functioning by 1348.

==== Further divisions ====
In 1346, the two younger brothers, John (I) and Peter (I) concluded a property settlement agreement. The estates received jointly in 1320 were divided among themselves: Peter was granted most of the villages laid in the area between the rivers Csetnek and Sajó (a portion in Csetnek, Ochtina, Rochfalva and Nagyszlabos), while John received Gencs, Gacsalk, the castle of Kövi and its namesake village, Nandrás, Vignye and Tarfalva. Both of them envisaged further settlements in the shared forests. In 1347, Nicholas (I) and his nephew Nicholas (III) complained that Peter (I) illegally carried out settlements on the border of Csetnek, which was still considered common property.

The Csetnekis reconciled with the Máriássy family in 1352 following series of lawsuits in the previous decades. According to their agreement, the Máriássys retained Berzéte, while the castle of Krasznahorka and its accessories – Krasznahorkaváralja (Krásnohorské Podhradie), Szalóc, Rekenye, Hosszúrét (Krásnohorská Dlhá Lúka) and Pacsa (Pača) – became a joint property of the Csetneki and Bebek families, especially Nicholas (I) "the Cuman" and the sons of the late Dominic (I) Bebek. Szalóc and Rekenye were detached from the Berzéte lordship during this act; both villages remained Csetneki property even after the Bebeks acquired Krasznahorka exclusively from themselves. Nicholas' sons, Ákos and George (I) concluded another division in 1362, for a period of eight years, which included the newly founded villages, Aranyas, Irmes and Fülepháza. According to the treaty, Ákos was granted the western and southern portion of Tapolca, while George received the eastern portion of the same settlement. The four other villages (Ardó, Szalóc, Rekenye and Sebespatak) remained joint properties. The brothers also divided the mills in the area among themselves. Inheriting wealth from his late uncles – John (I) and Peter (I) – Ákos (and, later, his son Michael) also possessed portions in Nagyszlabos, Gecelfalva, Ochtina and, even, Pelsőc.

Since both John (I) and Peter (I) died without male descendants, and the branch of Nicholas (I) also became extinct by the end of the 14th century (its last offspring was Michael, who was killed in the Battle of Nicopolis in 1396), all of the aforementioned estates were acquired by the Bebek family. The biggest loss for the Csetnekis was Kövi Castle, in addition to the surrounding area rich in iron ore called Vashegy. In 1401, the sons of Ladislaus (II) – from the only surviving Ladislaus (I) branch – protested against the Bebeks' acquisitions in vain.

==== 15th-century acquisitions ====
Tax census from 1427 lists the possessions of the Csetneki family in Gömör County. In the years before that, the estates were subject to numerous plundering raids by the Bebek family, which distorts the data. By 1427, the Csetnekis founded the small mining settlements Razimalja (predecessor of present-day Brdárka) and Kötélverő, which was identical with either Lehota (Čierna Lehota) or Feketepatak. They also founded Romokvágása, the predecessor of present-day Rejdová (Rédova), and Visegrád, which laid in the territory of present-day Slavoška. The latter village, together with Somkút, was recovered by John (III) after pledging in 1426 and handed over both lands to his brother Nicholas (V) in the next year. The 1427 tax centus mentions Oláhpatak (Vlachovo) too at the first time; around that time, the number of Vlach settlers increased significantly in the territory of the Csetnek lordship. The alternate name of Oláhpatak (Lampertfalva or Lambsdorf) reflects that it was originally a Saxon-inhabited village.

The most populous settlement was Csetnek with 70 porte, followed by Oláhpatak (40), Restér (33), Ardó (31), Rochfalva (30), Gecelfalva (28), Ochtina (28), Rekenye (21), Csákány (16), Gencs (14), Tornova (14), Kötélverő (14), Nagyszlabos (13), Somkút (12), Romokvágása (12), Sajó (10), Sebespatak (10), Pétermány (10), Aranyas (10), Rozlozsnya (8), Dobsina (7), Razimalja (7), Irmes (6) and Fülepháza (4). Consequently, the Csetnekis collected taxes from 455 porte of 24 settlements, all of them but Csákány laid in Upper Gömör, in the upper part of the Csetnek and Sajó rivers. The Bebek family already had greater influence in many settlements, violating the agreement of 1318. For instance, the remaining 46 porte of Dobsina belonged to them, but they had also interests in Rozlozsnya, Somkút and Szalóc.

==== Dissolution ====
After the death of Paul Bebek in late 1469, when the family's Vámos branch died out, the Csetnekis sought to acquire his possessions for reasons of kinship. However, in this endeavor they encountered with the increasingly dominant Zápolya family – Emeric Zápolya was the brother-in-law of the late Paul. George (II) Bebek from the Pelsőc branch also pledged large areas to the Zápolyas, despite the protest of the Csetneki family in 1470. Brothers Emeric and Stephen Zápolya laid their hands on deposits rich in iron ores and mines, which were adjacent to their lordship in Szepes County. His familiares frequently raided the Csetneki estates, primarily Dobsina, in the following months. The Csetnekis' complaint proves that the Zápolyas acquired interests in several estates where the Csetnekis owned portions, for instance, Ochtina, Gencs, Szalóc and, even, Csetnek. The Bebeks continued to sell off the estates to their ally, when John II Bebek handed over his inherited estates to Palatine Stephen Zápolya; John (IV) complained against this 1492. The palatine also intended to acquire the Bebek possessions outside Gömör County, also confronting with the Csetnekis during this act. The debtor John Bebek saw that if he linked his fate to a rising family, he would have a better chance of keeping at least some of his estates. However, this resulted in the Bebek–Csetneki lordship that had been established in the 1240s beginning to erode. In 1498, Elizabeth, the daughter of John (IV) and widow of Daniel Kátai, claimed her rightful share of the Csetneki estates. In 1514, Nicholas (VII) pledged his portions in Ochtina and Nagyszlabos for 75 golden florins to Stephen Szentannai, the husband of Dorothea, Nicholas' cousin.

With the changing economic and social situation (decline in mining and processing of extracted ore), many settlements ceased to exist during the 16th century. Their place was increasingly taken by settlements established by shepherds under Vlach law for the sake of extensive pastures. As a result, Kötélverő, Aranyas, Romokvágása and Irmes were succeeded by Lehota, Márkuska, Rédova and Hankova (Hanková), respectively. These settlements were also supervised by the Csetnekis. Berdárka (Brdárka), Henckó (Henckovce) and Uhorna (Úhorná) was formed during the same process. The proportion of taxpayers with surnames of Rusyn origin has become increasingly common in these settlements.

Tax censuses from 1548 and 1549 demonstrate that the Csetnekis lost numerous estates within the settlements by that time. Many of portions were jointly held by the Csetnekis, Bebeks and the Pauline monastery of Gombaszög. They were sole owners in Feketepatak, Gecelfalva, Pétermány, Razimalja, Somkút, Nagyszlabos, and perhaps Tornova, Felsőrochfalva and Dobsina in 1549. They altogether held possessions in 22 villages and two oppida (Csetnek and Dobsina), where 125 porte were obliged to pay tax to them. It can be seen that the drastic change occurred not in the number of settlements, but in the decrease in their size, compared to the data set from 1427. This is clearly due to the Ottoman military situation; the Turks launched many raids from their occupied fortress Fülek over the decades. Nevertheless, the Csetnekis lost some possessions, where they had nothing left of their own, by 1549: Oláhpatak, Gacsalk and Gombaszög. After the extinction of the Bebek family in 1567, their estates were escheated to the crown (administered by the Hungarian Royal Chamber or Camera Hungarica) and thereafter were attached to the castle districts of Krasznahorka and Szendrő. In 1582, King Rudolph confirmed the ownership of Michael (III) and Stephen (II) over estates Borsod, Gömör and Torna counties. Accordingly, the brothers possessed entirely Csetnek, Dobsina, Berdárka, Nagyszlabos, Feketepatak, Gecelfalva and Pétermány, in addition to estates Irmes (Kisszabos), Tornova and Somkút. They also possessed portions in Ochtina, Rochfalva, Lehota, Márkuska, Hankova, Rédova, Felsősajó, Gencs, Sebespatak, Rekenye, Tapolca, Szalóc, Ardó and Lekenye. After an agreement with the Lorántfis in 1592, Stephen (II) claimed portions in Csetnek, Tapolca, Tornova, Gencs, Sebespatak, Ochtina, Rekenye, Gecelfalva, Restér, Lekenye, Rochfalva, Rédova, Kisszabos–Irmes, Aranyas, Feketepatak, Felsősajó, Dobsina, Pétermány, Ardó and Márkuska. In the same year, Anne Máriássy, the widow of Michael (III), also possessed portions in most of the aforementioned estates. In 1600, the minor Francis (III) ruled over only eight whole, six halved and ten thirds of porte, in addition to two-thirds part of the revenues of local custom in the town Csetnek.

=== Economic activity ===
The settlement Csetnek and its surrounding area, which formed the Csetnekis' lordship, laid in the Gömör–Szepes Ore Mountains, which laid the foundation for the family's economic activities over the centuries. There were lead deposit in Ardó, and gold, silver and copper deposits in Berzéte and Dobsina. The 1318 and 1320 treaties concluded that if additional ore deposits are found on anyone's property, its use and benefit will be shared. The Csetnekis' lands had extensive forests, thus there was enough wood to build mines and process the extracted ore, while the nearby namesake streams at Csetnek and Dobsina, in addition to the upper course of Sajó provided enough hydropower to operate them.

Szénégető (Scenegetew, lit. "coal burner"), the original Hungarian name of Rekenye from 1329 reflects that ore processing works began in the very first era, still in the era of the Árpád dynasty in the 13th century. Lead exposure occurred in Ardó since the 1320s too; Ladislaus (I) complained in 1330, that his two brothers, Dominic (I) Bebek and Nicholas (I) "the Cuman" excluded him from the use of mined lead for seven years. In the same period, the Csetnekis opened a gold mine at Rudna (Rudná). After gold, silver, lead, and perhaps copper, the search for and extraction of iron ore deposits – near Rákos and Dobsina – became a priority. Near the mines, the Csetnekis established hammer mills to smelt and process the extracted ore on site. These mills were operating in Csetnek already in 1344, the first such mention of this kind of institution in the Kingdom of Hungary. It is possible that the Csetnekis adopted the method via Polish or German settlers. Most of the hammer mills were built along the river Hnilec (Gölnic) near Dobsina, but there were such buildings near Ochtina and Restér. The location of the hammer mills became important in the division of estates among the family members. In 1370, Michael (I) accused his relatives of secretly dividing the hammer mill profits among themselves, leaving him out. Under the guidance of the Csetnekis, the local blacksmiths' guild has already been formed in their main residence Csetnek prior to 1448, the first such known outside free royal cities.

Initially, the Csetneki family made little profit from the activity. In 1344, John (I) was in debt to their creditor Nicholas, a wealthy burgher from Jolsva (Jelšava). This Nicholas invested in the Csetnekis' ore extraction network for the long term. In the 1350s, Nicholas (III) owed him too, and brothers Ákos and Ladislaus (III) also had a business relationship with him in 1358 and 1359, respectively. By the 1370s, ore mining and processing provided a steady and secure income for all family members, which they could then convert into political influence in the last regnal years of Louis I. Around this time, the fight for the hammer mills between the two families, the Bebeks and Csetnekis in the Gömör region began.

The Csetnekis were personally involved in foreign trade of processed ore. According to a document from 1396, they contracted Ulrich, a merchant from Nuremberg, who transported the ore through Buda. It is plausible that the Csetnekis' ore was shipped out of the kingdom to Poland, from where, for instance, it reached the Baltics. The import of Hungarian copper was controlled by merchants from Krakow in Poland. Around the same time, copperware from the Gömör region appeared in the ports of Lübeck, "capital" of the Hanseatic League. From there it reached Bruges and the Republic of Venice. Iron from the Gömör–Szepes Ore Mountains was also exported through Poland since the beginning of the 15th century. The Csetnekis also supplied the Hungarian capital Buda with raw materials, thus becoming suppliers of the royal court of Sigismund through intermediaries. The iron from Csetnek frequently reached Transylvania in exchange for salt. The Csetnekis personally delivered the ores to major markets and payment points within Hungary. To increase capacity, the Csetnekis rented out many hammer mills to merchants, for instance, to burghers of Igló (Spišská Nová Ves) in Dobsina, who benefited from the yield and could trade the processed ore themselves, while the Csetnekis profited from the previously agreed mining revenues (urbura). King Matthias permitted Ladislaus (VI), John (IV) and Nicholas (VI) to open new mines in Dobsina, Martonyi and Szalonna in 1474, on the condition that they were obliged to pay urbura in the event of the discovery of new precious metals. John leased some mines there to local merchants in 1475. Iron from Csetnek gradually became an important element of the Hungarian weapons manufacturing (arquebus) by the end of the 15th century, when the Ottoman threat heavily emerged. Around the same time, steel production also began on the Csetneki estates.

=== Properties and assets ===
Most of the family members lived in manors in Csetnek after the 1320 division of estates. While serving as vice-ispán, Peter had a residence in Nógrád (1348), and John (I) also possessed a manor in Kövi prior to his death in 1358. They possessed the castle itself too, which, however, remained uninhabited due to maintenance costs. After Queen Mary donated Szolcsány in Nyitra County to Nicholas (V) and his wife in 1389, the Csetnekis acquired interests in the Hrussó lordship too (provoking resistance from the local Tapolcsányi family). After some exchanges, the Csetnekis acquired the castle of Hrussó by the early 15th century. The upper part of Nyitra County became a second stronghold of the family after Gömör County until the mid-15th century. In addition, they elevated into positions in the royal court under King Sigismund. As a result, Ladislaus (IV) bought a house in the Hungarian capital Óbuda for himself, his brothers – Nicholas (V) and John (III) – and nephews – George (III) and Andrew (I) – in 1427. Sigismund also permitted Ladislaus and his brothers to build a castle in their main residence Csetnek in 1432, in order to defense against the Hussite incursions. Ladislaus decided to erect the fort near the Virgin Mary church, on a flat area. The expansion and reconstruction of the castle (or, rather, a fortified manor) continued throughout the 15–16th centuries. Prior to 1582, the Csetnekis possessed a house also in Szendrő in Borsod County. In that year, Thomas Szécsi, the commander of the local fort arbitrarily confiscated the building from them.

Last wills and testaments from 1402, 1433, 1465, 1512 and 1592 and two inventories from 1498 and 1596 testify to the family's material assets. According to a charter from 1348, Nicholas (III) pledged a chalice and missal book to the parish priest of Dobsina. In 1397, Pope Boniface IX permitted George (II) to use his own portable altar during his trips abroad. In accordance with George's last will in 1402, his son, Sigismund (II) was granted a silver amphora in 1406. Helena Deméndi, the wife of Nicholas (V) owned two gilded silver chalices in 1414. In 1424, John (III) bought a lot of textile (sindon and gyolcs) in Bártfa (Bardejov). George's daughter, Catherine compiled her last will and testament in 1433, which provides the most valuable information regarding the family's movable property. She appointed cleric Ladislaus (IV) as executor and guarantor of the document. Catherine listed her assets in detail: cassocks, wedding gifts, cloaks, chasubles, silk towels, jeweled hair ornaments, gold and silver rings, tunic buttons, silver utensils, silverware set, crosses containing holy relics. She bequeathed her assets to the Virgin Mary church in Csetnek, her servants and family members, the sons and grandchildren of Ladislaus (II), especially the still unmarried daughters of John (III).

Andrew (I) is the next family member, whose last will is preserved compiled in Eger in 1465. The document is testifying to heavy debts, many of his valuables (jewelry and luxurious clothing) were pawned. He instructed his wife Helena Keresztúri to pay off creditors and recover the items. Among of them were canons of the cathedral chapter of Eger, familiares of the bishop and a Jewish merchant named Joshua. Andrew donated many horses for his spiritual salvation to the local parish priest. As mentioned above, he appointed prominent persons as guardians of his minor children. Two of his sons, Ladislaus (VI) and John (IV), were involved in a financial dispute with each other. According to a list of revenues compiled by John in 1498, John had numerous material conflicts with his own brother Ladislaus, who owed his brother many estates, valuables and sums of money, and lived a lavish lifestyle. John mentioned that Ladislaus even melted down the silver sword that John had received from Elizabeth Szilágyi for his faithful service, in addition to theft of other personal belongings and the unauthorized use of their common heirdom. According to the complaint, Ladislaus appropriated the inheritance of their sister Catherine (jewelry, clothes). John also recalled that on several occasions he used his wealth to help his brother, who was involved in various losing lawsuits (including the financial compensation of Tamás Bakócz, Bishop of Eger, who threatened to excommunicate Ladislaus). Even though Ladislaus was living off his relatives' money, John helped him out of trouble time and again. The dying John Csetneki compiled his last will and testament in his manor at Csetnek on 12 August 1512. He left all his wealth to his only son Andrew (II) and forgave all his debtors all their debts. He left it to his son to take care of the financial support of the church in Csetnek. The document does not mention his chattels. John's daughter, Catherine, who died before 1520, owned a dress adorned with 200 golden florins worth of jewelry. She donated it to the St. George church in Feled (Jesenské).

Anne Máriássy, the widow of Michael (III) compiled her last testament in her estate Csépánfalu (present-day a borough of Markušovce) on 28 January 1592. She appointed her brothers as guardians of her minor children since Stephen (II), the brother of his late husband actively participated in the campaigns against the Turks. In addition, she also disagreed with the religious conversation of his brother-in-law. Anne's possessions included skirts (which reflects Renaissance influence into Hungarian fashion by that time), Italian linen cloth, several subas (head-gear), tiaras, veils, carpets, gold embroidered bed linens, Venetian copper bathtub. Anne had a huge herd of animals and feed warehouses on her estates. An inventory from 1596 is preserved too, which lists the assets in the castle of Csetnek in that year, when Stephen's widow, Anne Zeleméry, and their three daughters were living there. In the upper room of the late Stephen (II), there were cabinets and an almarium, decorative chests and boxes full of clothes and charters, in addition to coins, guns, swords, shields, armors and harness accessories. In the lower room, there were food (spices, meats and crops).

== Cultural legacy ==
=== Parish Church of Csetnek ===
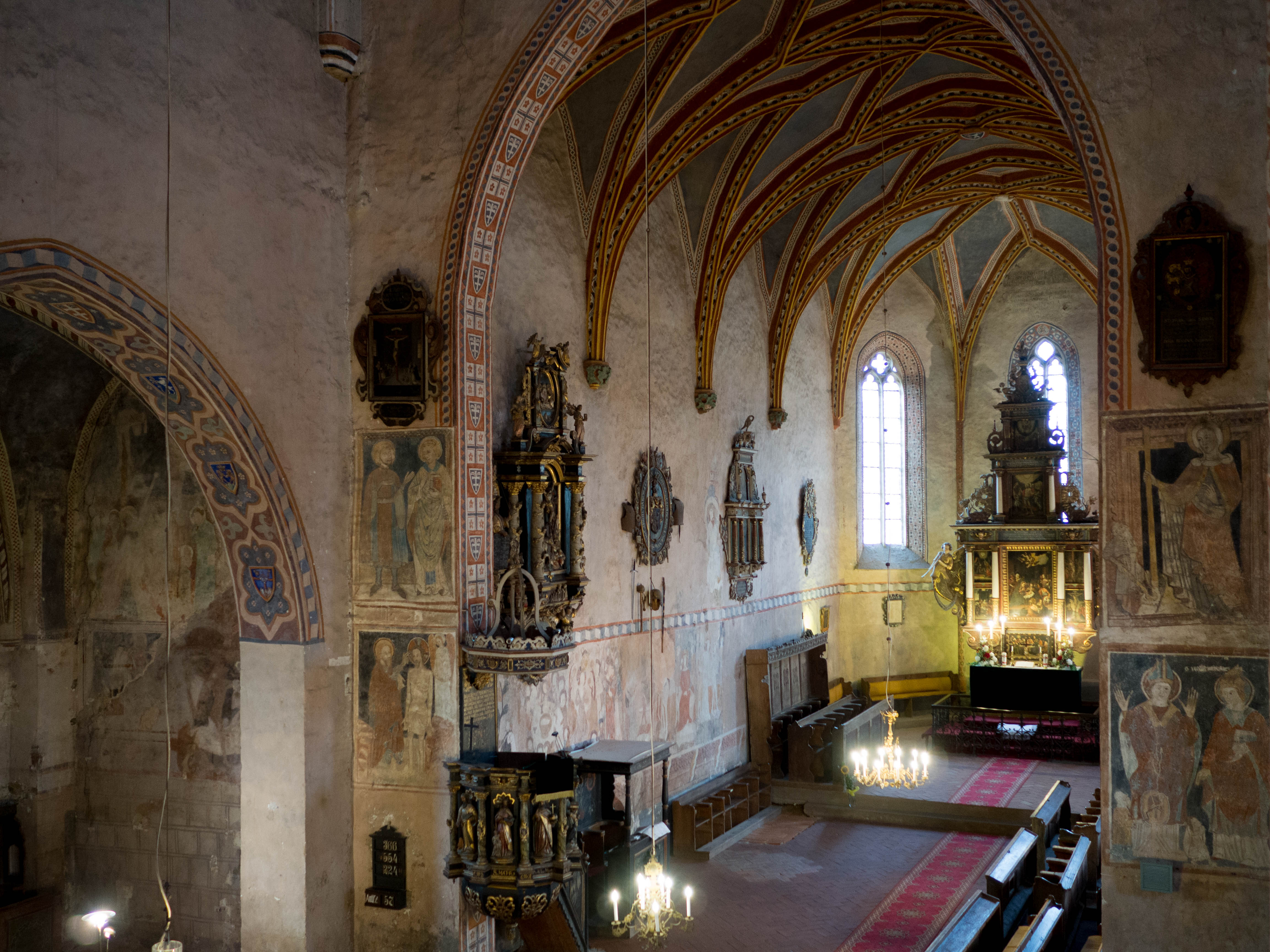
Interior of the Lutheran church of Štítnik (Csetnek)

The Virgin Mary church in Csetnek became the main family sanctuary after 1333, when Stephen Bebek appropriated the stewardship of the St. George church in Pelsőc, excluding the Csetneki family. The church of Csetnek is first mentioned by the List of Papal Tithes from 1332–1337 in the Kingdom of Hungary. The first building was constructed sometime before the 13th century; it was a single-nave building with a right-angled presbytery. In the second half of the 13th century, Derek or his son Benedict expanded the church with a tower and a sacristy in the northern part, which functioned as an archives. Construction took place in several stages in the 14th century, as a result of which the church became a three-nave basilica. In addition to the sons of Benedict, local residents also played their part in the construction, and with permission they were allowed to use their tithe payments for this purpose. The Virgin Mary church was one of the most profitable parishes in the Archdeaconry of Gömör. Upon the request of the Csetnekis, Archbishop Csanád Telegdi permitted parish priest John and his successors to pay tithe in uniform flat tax (8 marks). When Ákos and George (I) divided their estates in the town in 1362, the church functioned as a boundary stone.

The first interior frescoes were completed in the mid-14th century. One of them is called "The Triumph of Death" which is located in the east wall of the north aisle. Art historian Milan Togner considered that the fresco was painted by the same Italian artist (presumably from Padua) who also created the fresco "The Crucifixion" in the church in Pelsőc. The Gömör–Szepes Ore Mountains provided the raw materials (limestone, iron-containing painting soil, azurite, malachite, glaucophane) that were essential for the murals. The main artistic source was the Trecento art in Italy which George Bebek became acquainted with when he participated as a general in the Neapolitan campaigns of Louis the Great, and as a Hungarian envoy, he visited Ferrara and Padua. Peter (I) Csetneki also participated in the same campaign. Possibly both of them returned to Hungary with Italian artists.

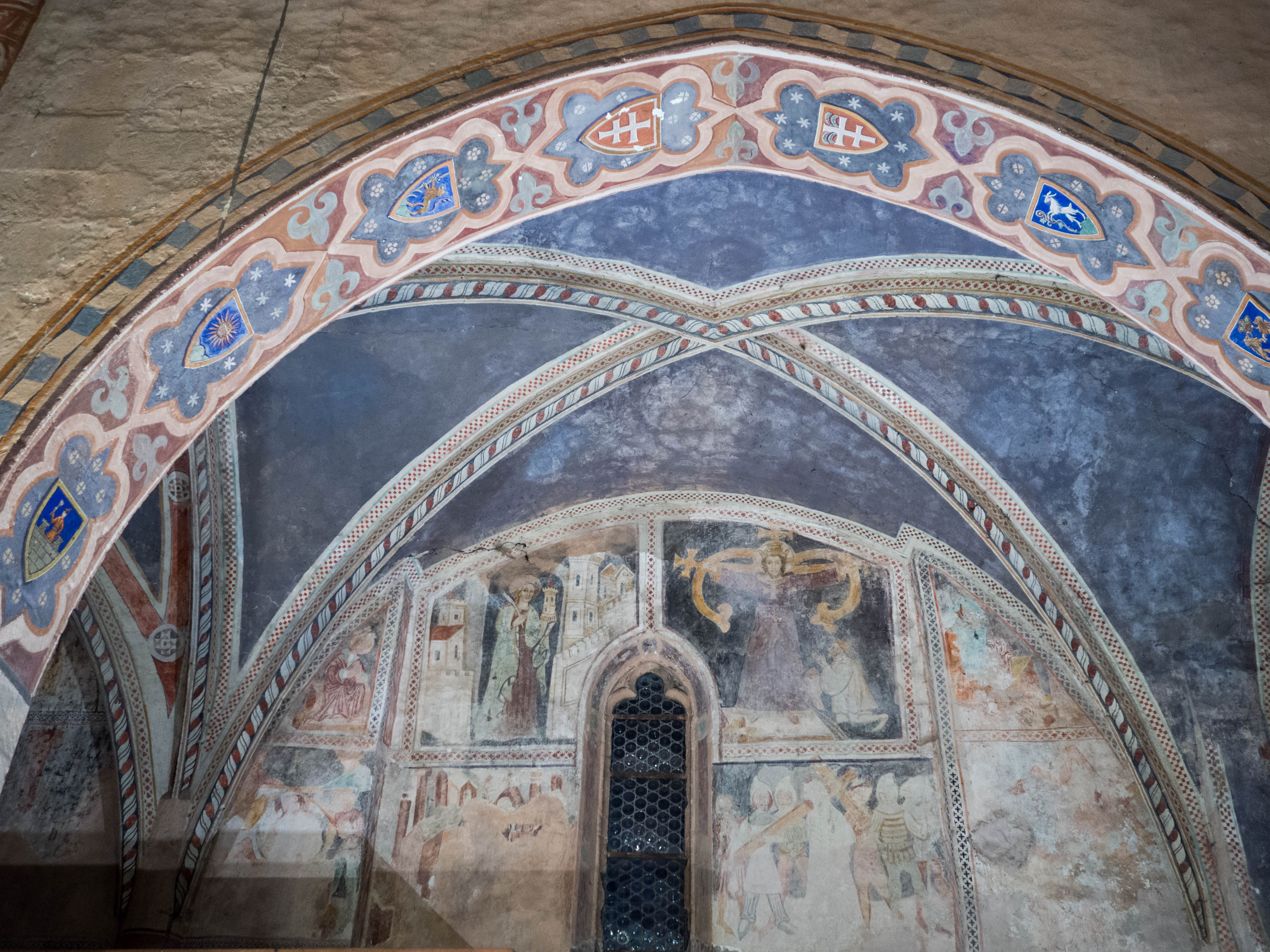
Frescoes in the Lutheran church of Štítnik (Csetnek)

In 1397, Pope Boniface IX confirmed the tithe exemption for the church of Csetnek, upon the request of George (II). With his funding, the reconstruction of the church into a three-aisled basilica was finished. His efforts was continued by his cousin Ladislaus (IV) after 1402. The timber used for the deck structure of the church's main nave was cut in 1414 or 1415. The clergyman Ladislaus personally selected the liturgical scenes depicted in the frescoes, including a Volto Santo scene and a cycle which depicts the life of Francis of Assisi. Another scene, the Parable of the Talents may have depicts King Sigismund and three members of the Csetneki family themselves. His goal was to rebuild the parish church into a basilica in the grand style, based on royal examples in Hungary and Austria, but this ultimately remained incomplete. The simultaneous expansion and construction of the church and castle placed a great burden on the family, which was hampered by the subsequent turbulent period in Upper Hungary. The construction of the planned northern burial chapel was also not completed. Catherine bequeathed the estate Csákány and several jewels and cloths to the church in her last will in 1433. Ladislaus' death in 1450 and the simultaneous Hussite incursions halted the construction and caused damage to the building which was burnt and some gates were crushed. Since the 1440s, the St. James, St. George and St. Sophia altars are mentioned. Repair work continued in the 1460s, the roof above the triumphal arch and main choir was bricked up with net-vaults, similarly to the technique of Peter Parler, by a certain stone carver Simon. The baptismal font and the two- and three-part Gothic windows with flame motifs were completed during the era of Andrew (I) in the same period. Regarding the south portal and presbytery, the Cathedral of St. Elizabeth in Kassa (Košice) served as a model for Simon.

The original three-nave basilica was never completed, and the pseudo-hall arrangement of the eastern choirs also remained unfinished due to the Csetnekis' financial constraints. Ladislaus (VI) had to pledge his estate in Szalóc to finance the revenues of the Virgin Mary church. The rectangular niche in the southern part of the sanctuary was completed in the last third of the 15th century. Further frescoes were made during this period (for instance, the depiction of Anthony the Great and administering the Seven Sacraments). Under John (IV), the tower was renovated and reconstructed sometime between 1501 and 1504; a new organ gallery and a choir bench for city council members were built too. The present-day organ itself also originates from this period. In his last will from 1512, John (IV) instructed his son Andrew (II) to financially cover the roof of the church. Thereafter, no significant work has been done on the building, which became a Lutheran church after the conversion of Stephen (II). The last male members of the Csetneki family, Stephen (II) and Francis (III) were buried under the church altar.

=== Churches in other settlements ===
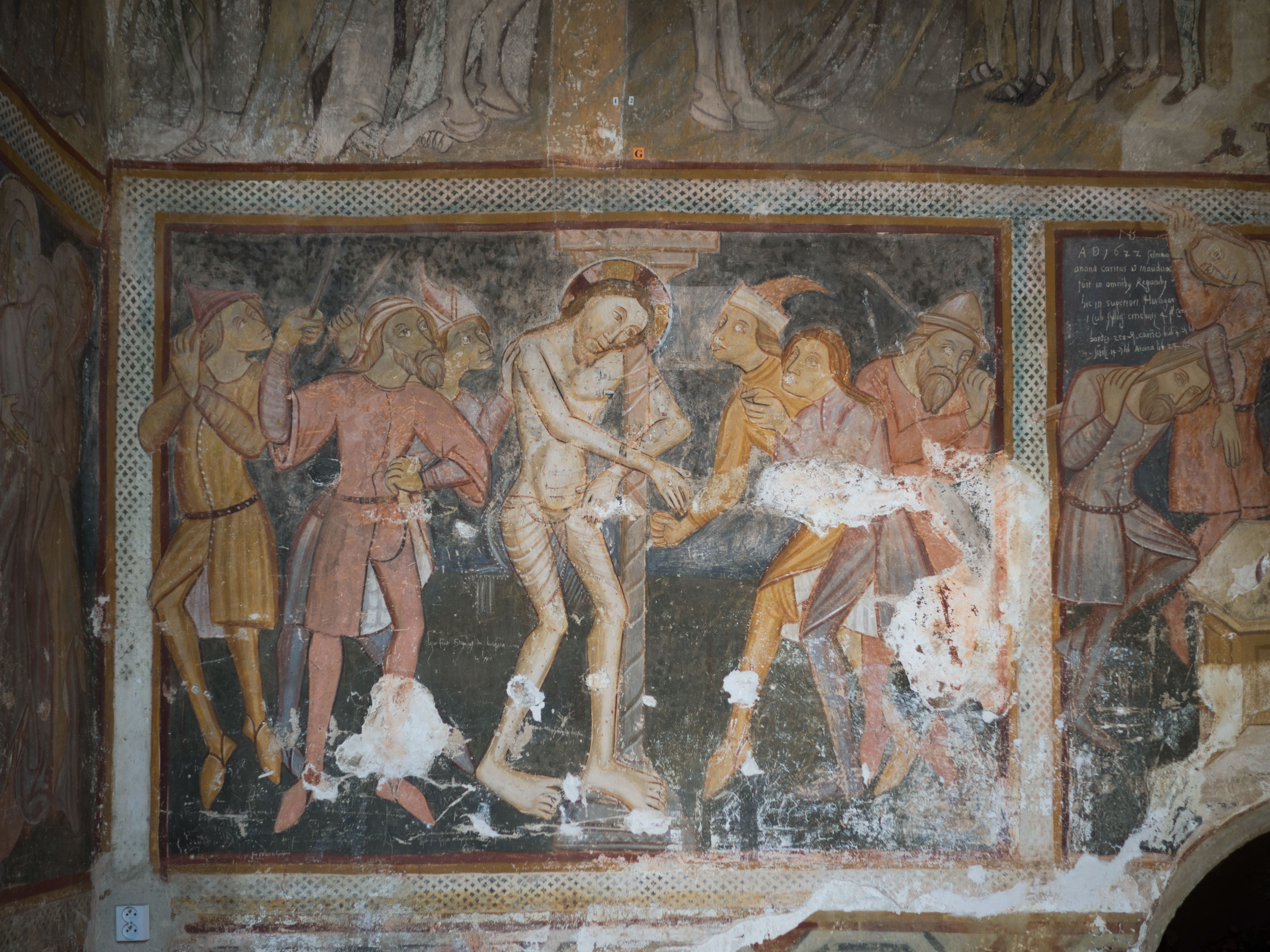
A fresco in the Lutheran church of Ochtiná, Slovakia

Beside Csetnek, the members of the family also contributed to the construction of churches in other settlements of their lordship in Gömör County. The St. Nicholas church in Ochtina, which functioned as a centre of the estates laid in the Csetnek valley, is referred to as a parish church by the aforementioned list of papal tithes from 1332–1337. Peter (I) chose the settlement as his home after 1354. Under his finance, the interiors of the church were painted with figural wall paintings which were done by fresco technique. After his death, his nephews inherited the estate, who rebuilt the church; according to the remains of the roof above the presbytery, it took place around 1377. The largest volume of construction took place in the second half of the 15th century, under Andrew (I) or John (IV). The tower was constructed during that time, while the northern wall of the main nave of the church was pierced with two arcades so that a side nave covered with a star vault could be built next to it. During this time, the entire roof structure was replaced. The church's frescoes were completed in several stages during the 14th century. One of them depicts Saint Louis of Toulouse, which expressed Peter's loyalty and homage to the Hungarian royal dynasty, the Capetian House of Anjou.

The church of Restér was built in the late 13th century, which is shown by the main nave ending in a square shape. It was dedicated to St. Andrew, according to the 1332–1337 list of tithes. It was heavily reconstructed in the mid-14th century, under the sons of Nicholas (I). Remains of frescoes were discovered inside, which were painted in the first half of the 15th century. Alongside biblical theme, one of the fragments depicts Elizabeth of Hungary.

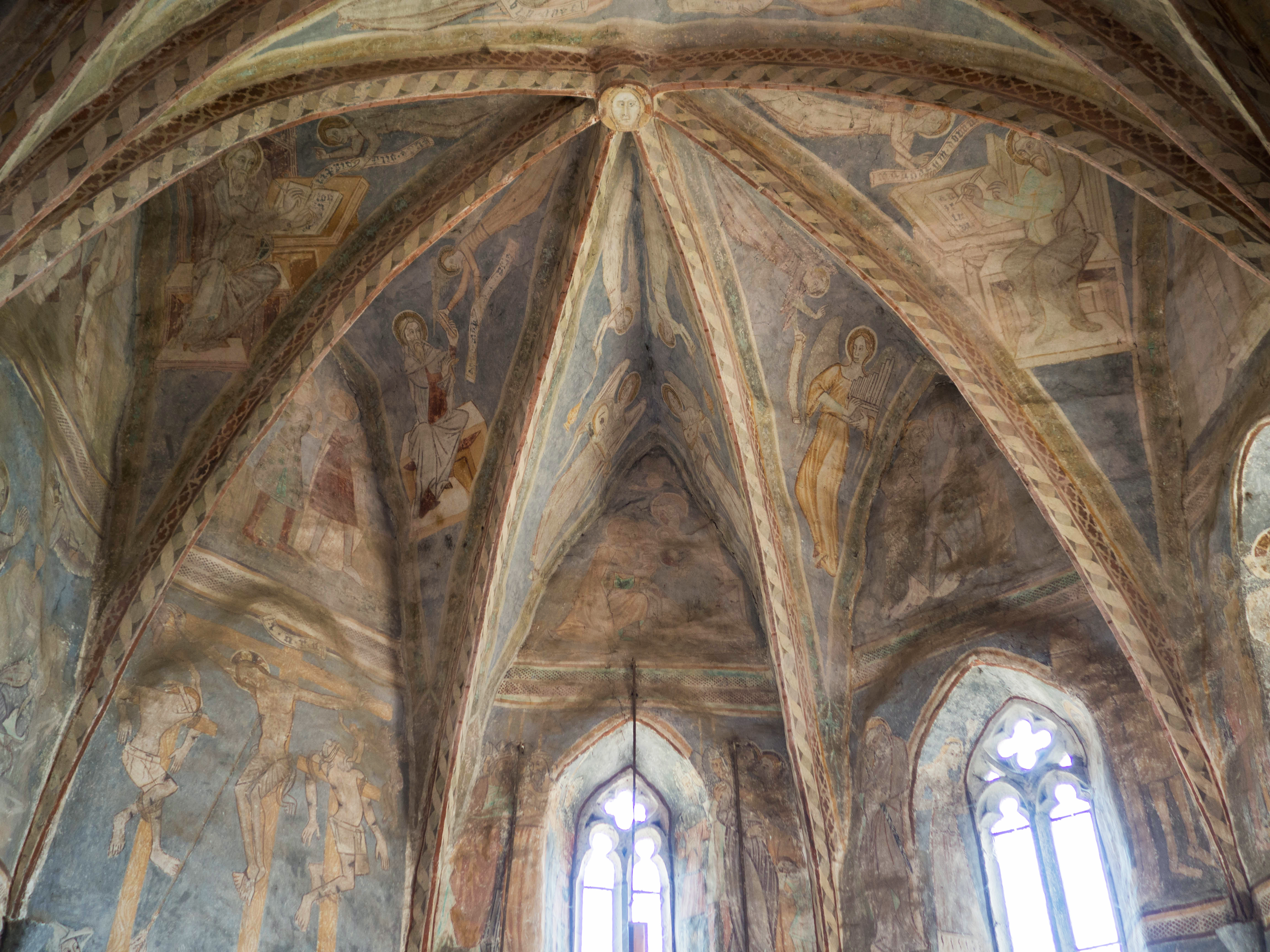
Frescoes in the Lutheran church of Koceľovce (Gecelfalva) in Slovakia

The church of Gecelfalva was possessed by Ladislaus (I) and his sons. In 1356, Nicholas (III) pledged his portion for 31 marks. The church was rebuilt in the mid-14th century, when the original chapel vault was demolished and the height of the walls was raised. A new sanctuary with a barrel vault was built in the northern part. The church was again reconstructed in the early 16th century, when a new main door was installed (this is the oldest surviving piece of equipment of this kind in the present-day Gemer region). Its 14th-century frescoes represent the same school of painting as the decorations of the church in Ochtina. One of them depicts Catherine of Alexandria with a wheel, patron of the craftsmen and educators.

The single-nave church of Nagyszlabos, with a monumental west tower, was built in the 14th century too. It was heavily reconstructed in the 16th and 18th centuries, only the presbytery remains of the original building. Its mural paintings with buon fresco technique were partly discovered. The churches of Márkuska, Sajó and Feketepatak were built by Nicholas (I) or Ladislaus (II) in the first half of the 14th century. The church of Dobsina was also erected sometime between 1334 and 1348. The churches in Felsősajó and Oláhpatak were built in the 15th century, as well as the new church in Rekenye (the first church was built in the nearby mountains sometime in the mid-13th century). The paintings on the outer walls of the church in Sajó were made in the early 15th century. According to an 18th-century census, the interior walls of the then Lutheran church in Oláhpatak also contained medieval frescoes behind a layer of lime. The mural paintings of Dobsina were also discovered; one fresco depicts Saint Jerome with a cardinal's robe and hat, while another painting depicts Hildegard of Bingen, a popular saint in Central Europe.

According to Ladislaus (IV), who visited the Roman Curia in 1433, his late father Ladislaus (II) established seven churches. This may rather cover complete constructions in the second half of the 14th century. These took place in Csetnek, Restér, Ochtina and Gecelfalva during the lifetime of Ladislaus (II). The churches of Márkuska (Aranyas) and Sajó, as mentioned above, were plausibly constructed in the same period. It is possible that the erection of Dobsina is connected to his name too. Ladislaus (II) was a devout Christian; he requested his kinship to support the Gombaszög monastery with donations in 1371. With the consent of his sons, nephews and the widow of Peter (I), he gifted the Pauline monks in the same year with a portion from his inherited estate in Gombaszög. The Paulines arrived the area in the very recent years, possibly after the death of Peter (I) in 1366 or 1367. The Csetnekis were patrons of the Gombaszög monastery until the late 14th century, when the Bebek family succeeded them. Catherine, the daughter of John (IV) donated her portion Borzova (Silická Brezová) in Torna County to the monastery in 1505. Her family (the Lorántfis) were elected to the fraternity in 1507. Both Nicholas Lorántfi and Catherine, together with their children actively participated in the religious life of the monastery thereafter.

=== Tombstones ===
Michael (III) died on 14 October 1588. He was buried in the church of Márkusfalva (Markušovce), thus it is possible that he lived in the main residence of his wife's family, the Máriássys in Szepes County. His tombstone, which survived, was ordered by his widow Anne Máriássy around 1588. The tombstone is made of marble, 188 cm high, 100 cm wide, and its depth ranges from 3.5 to 6.7 cm. The epitaph lists the children of the couple: Christopher, Ladislaus (VIII), Francis (III), Anne and Sophia. Of them only Francis and Anne were still alive by 1592, when their mother Anne Máriássy compiled her last testament. The epitaph refers to Michael as "a nobleman distinguished for his honesty and religiosity". The marble tombstone of Anne Máriássy, who died in late February 1592, is also located in the same chapel as her husband's. Its epitaph testifies that "there have not been many marriages in our time that have remained so intact until the death of both parties".

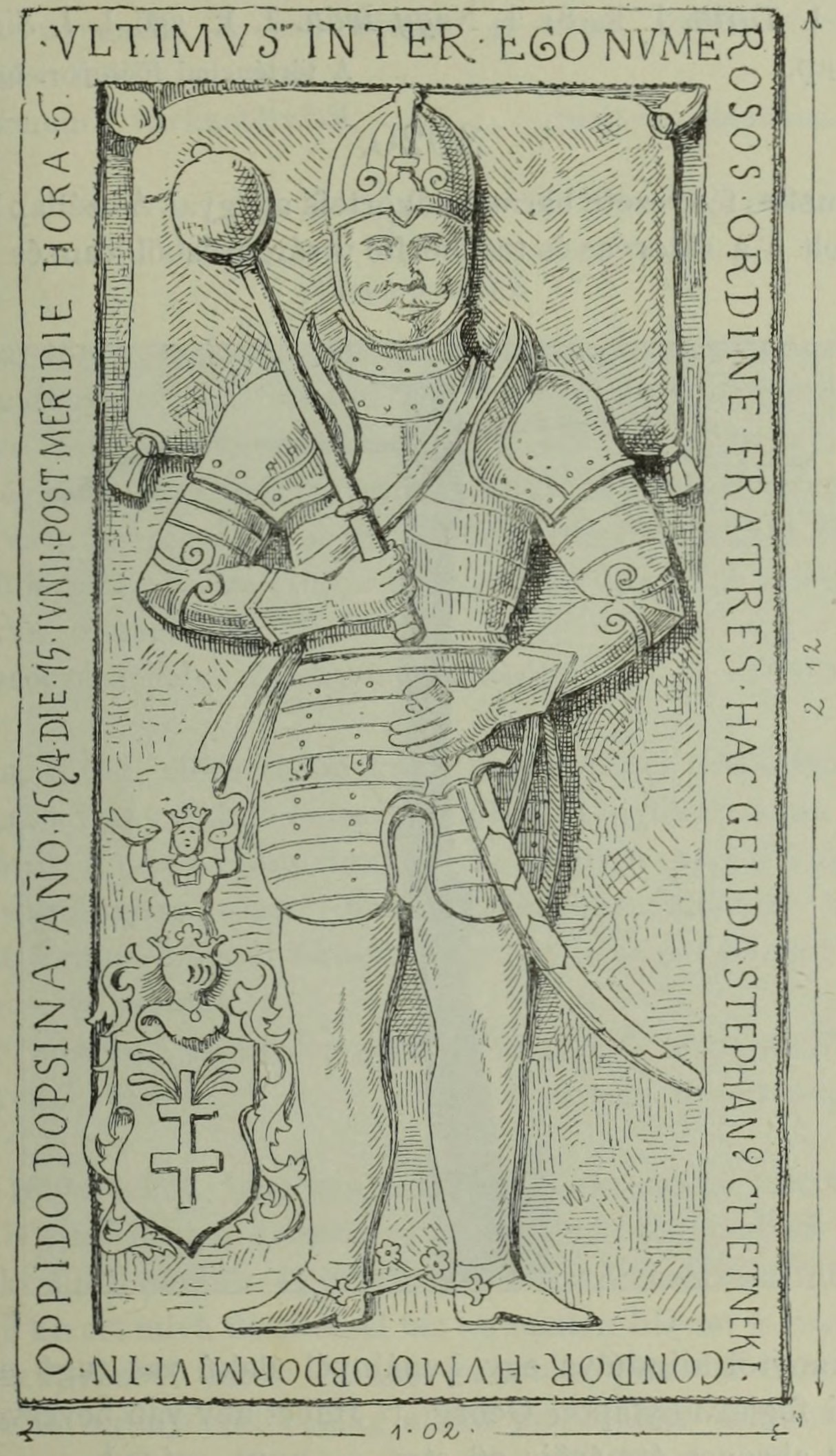
The tombstone of Stephen (II) Csetneki from 1594 (drawing, 1890)

The tombs of Stephen (II) and Francis (III) were buried in the crypt under the sanctuary in the church of Csetnek. In late 19th century, these were transferred to the south chapel. Stephen's 2.2-meter-long and 1.32-meter-wide tombstone is made of coarse-grained sandstone. According to its epitaph, Stephen, last of his brothers, died in Dobsina on 15 June 1594 at 6 pm. Another epitaph in the western part of the tombstone writes that "Stephen did not believe before [the siege of] Fülek that he would rest in peace in the earth. But suddenly a terrible pain filled him. The Judge quickly raised his bloody hand to him". Based on this, Slovak historian Monika Tihányiová considered that Stephen was killed in action during the first year of the Long Turkish War. The tombstone relief depicts the full-figured Stephen with mustachioed face in knight's helmet and chest armor but his legs are uncovered. His head rests on a pillow. The figure holds a mace in his right hand, his left hand rests on the hilt of a sword attached to his waist belt. Stephen's sarcophagus may have been made in a local stone carving workshop, perhaps commissioned by his sister Sophia and her son Stephen Görgey.

Francis (III) was the last male member of the family, who died as a child in 1602. His tombstone depicts a coat-of-arms and a multi-line text table (tabula ansata) without relief figure representation. The tombstone was presumably ordered by his uncle and guardian Francis Máriássy. The long text commemorates the origin of the Csetneki family and their common roots with the "glorious" Bebeks, thus the ancient noble lineage was not allowed to be forgotten despite centuries of conflict between the two families. Regarding Francis, the text praises that "the last to live here was Francis, the great jewel of this family, a strong-souled, heaven-glorifying, and unparalleled hero of true faith, whom fate had recently called to the heights".

All three tombstones depict the coat-of-arms of the Csetneki family, which is almost identical to the Bebek family coat-of-arms. The crest is a crowned female head holding in her hands two fish with their tails curving upwards to her mouth (in contrast, in the Bebek coat-of-arms, the female figure holds two fishes in her mouth, the tails of which touch above the woman's head). It often substitutes the double cross as a symbol of the coat-of-arms itself. Palm leaves grow from the double cross in the coats-of-arms of both families. No contemporary depiction of the Csetneki coat-of-arms has survived before these late 16th-century tombstones.

== Family tree ==
- Benedict I (fl. 1281–1307)
  - daughter (fl. 1290) ∞ Nicholas Kacsics
  - Dominic I (fl. 1307–1333) --> Bebek family
  - Stephen I (fl. 1307–1311)
  - Nicholas I ("the Cuman"; fl. 1307–1354) --> Csetneki family
    - James (fl. 1336–1340)
    - Nicholas II (fl. 1337–1353)
    - Dominic II (fl. 1342–1354)
    - Ákos (fl. 1342–1367)
      - Michael I (fl. 1370–1396†) ∞ (1) Margaret Serkei, (2) Clara Zsámboki
    - George I (fl. 1350–1367)
    - Ladislaus III (fl. 1350–1359)
    - Catherine (fl. 1378) ∞ James Farkasfalvi (fl. 1324–1347)
  - Ladislaus I (fl. 1307–1339; d. before 1342) --> Csetneki family
    - Nicholas III ("the Red"; fl. 1339–1359)
      - George II (fl. 1367–1402†) ∞ Catherine N
        - Catherine (fl. 1402–1435) ∞ Ladislaus Ostfi
        - Sigismund II (fl. 1403–1418; d. before 1420) ∞ Dorothea Dunajeci (fl. 1402–1420)
          - Gregory (fl. 1414; d. before 1420)
          - Margaret (fl. 1414)
      - Peter II (fl. 1367–1381)
    - Ladislaus II (fl. 1339–1379) ∞ (1?) Elizabeth Derencsényi, (2) Helena Szalonnai
      - Nicholas V (fl. 1383–1432; d. before 1435) ∞ Helena Deméndi (fl. 1389–1414)
        - George III (fl. 1408–1429)
        - Margaret (fl. 1420–1421)
      - Elizabeth (fl. 1383) ∞ John Kazai
      - Ladislaus IV (fl. 1396–1450†)
      - John III (fl. 1396–1444; d. before 1455) ∞ Clara Nagymihályi (fl. 1416)
        - Peter III (fl. 1426)
        - Andrew I (fl. 1426–1465†) ∞ Helena Keresztúri (fl. 1462–1472)
          - Ladislaus VI (fl. 1465–1503) ∞ (1) Catherine Bánfi (fl. 1454–1474; d. before 1479), (2) Anne Cudar (fl. 1483–1501)
            - (1) Francis I (fl. 1479–1523†) ∞ Catherine N. (fl. 1523)
            - (1) Nicholas VII (fl. 1507–1514)
            - (2) Bernard (fl. 1501–1511)
              - Caspar ∞ Sophia Fülpesi
              - Ladislaus VII (fl. 1541–1576) ∞ (1) Anne Dévényi, (2) Anne Kenderesi
                - Francis II (fl. 1576) ∞ Sarah Szécsi
                - Andrew IV (fl. 1578–1580) ∞ Susanna Báthory
                  - Barbara (fl. 1592)
                - Michael III (fl. 1582–1588†) ∞ Anne Máriássy (fl. 1588–1592†)
                  - Christopher (fl. 1588; d. before 1592)
                  - Ladislaus VIII (fl. 1588; d. before 1592)
                  - Francis III (fl. 1588–1602†)
                  - Anne (fl. 1588–1592) ∞ Nicholas Monoki
                  - Sophia (fl. 1588; d. before 1592)
                - Stephen II (fl. 1576–1594†) ∞ Anne Zeleméry
                  - Margaret (fl. 1592)
                  - Sophia (fl. 1592)
                  - Barbara (fl. 1592)
                - John VI ∞ Christina Bayi
                - Sophia (fl. 1592) ∞ Christopher Görgey
                - Clara (d. before 1592) ∞ Michael Cserney (d. before 1582)
                - (?) Paul II (fl. 1571–1583)
            - (2) Benedict II
            - (2) John V (fl. 1501)
            - (2) Susanna (fl. 1501)
          - John IV (fl. 1465–1512†) ∞ Hedwig N. (fl. 1512)
            - Andrew II (fl. 1512–1533)
            - Dorothea ∞ (1) Ladislaus Lorántfi, (2) Stephen Szentannai (fl. 1514)
            - Catherine (d. before 1520) ∞ Nicholas Lorántfi
          - Derek (fl. 1465–1466)
          - Nicholas VI (fl. 1465–1498) ∞ unidentified (fl. 1512)
            - Andrew III (fl. 1516–1518)
            - Ursula ∞ Caspar Szkárosi
            - Peter IV (fl. 1531–1539†) ∞ Barbara N. (fl. 1539)
            - Sigismund III (fl. 1533–1540)
            - Emeric (fl. 1540)
          - Paul I (fl. 1465–1466)
          - Michael II (fl. 1465–1470)
          - Catherine (fl. 1498)
        - Helena (fl. 1435–1455) ∞ John Debrői
        - Elizabeth (fl. 1435–1498) ∞ Daniel Kátai
        - Anne (fl. 1435–1436)
        - Ladislaus V (fl. 1447–1450)
      - Sigismund I (fl. 1408–1417)
  - Anne (fl. 1307–1349) ∞ (1) Nicholas Forgács, (2) John Leányfalvi
  - John I (fl. 1318–1357; d. before 1358)
    - daughter (fl. 1349) ∞ Peter Jolsvai (fl. 1340–1353)
  - Peter I (fl. 1318–1366; d. before 1367) ∞ unidentified (fl. 1371)
    - John II (fl. 1354–1363)
    - Nicholas IV (fl. 1354–1363)
  - daughter (fl. 1329) ∞ Roland Szalonnai
  - Catherine (fl. 1353–1368) ∞ Tombold Szkárosi

== Sources ==
- C. Tóth, Norbert; Horváth, Richárd; Neumann, Tibor; Pálosfalvi, Tamás; W. Kovács, András (2017). Magyarország világi archontológiája, 1458–1526, II. Megyék [Secular Archontology of Hungary, 1458–1526, Volume II: Counties] (in Hungarian). MTA Bölcsészettudományi Kutatóközpont Történettudományi Intézete. ISBN 978-963-4160-85-4.
- C. Tóth, Norbert (2019). Az esztergomi székes- és társaskáptalanok archontológiája 1100–1543 [Archontology of the Cathedral and Collegiate Chapters of Esztergom, 1100–1543] (in Hungarian). Magyar Tudományos Akadémia Magyar Medievisztikai Kutatócsoportja. ISBN 978-963-508-913-0.
- Engel, Pál (1996). Magyarország világi archontológiája, 1301–1457, I. [Secular Archontology of Hungary, 1301–1457, Volume I] (in Hungarian). História, MTA Történettudományi Intézete. ISBN 963-8312-44-0.
- Tihányiová, Monika (2022). A Csetnekiek. Kultúrtörténeti és gazdaságtörténeti barangolások Felső-Gömörben [The Csetnekis. Cultural and Economic Historical Walking Tours in Upper Gemer] (in Hungarian). Translated by Padlovics, Ágnes. Martin Opitz Kiadó. ISBN 978-615-6388-09-4.
- Zsoldos, Attila (2011). Magyarország világi archontológiája, 1000–1301 [Secular Archontology of Hungary, 1000–1301] (in Hungarian). História, MTA Történettudományi Intézete. ISBN 978-963-9627-38-3.
