= Nandraž =

Nandraž Nandrás
- Municipality
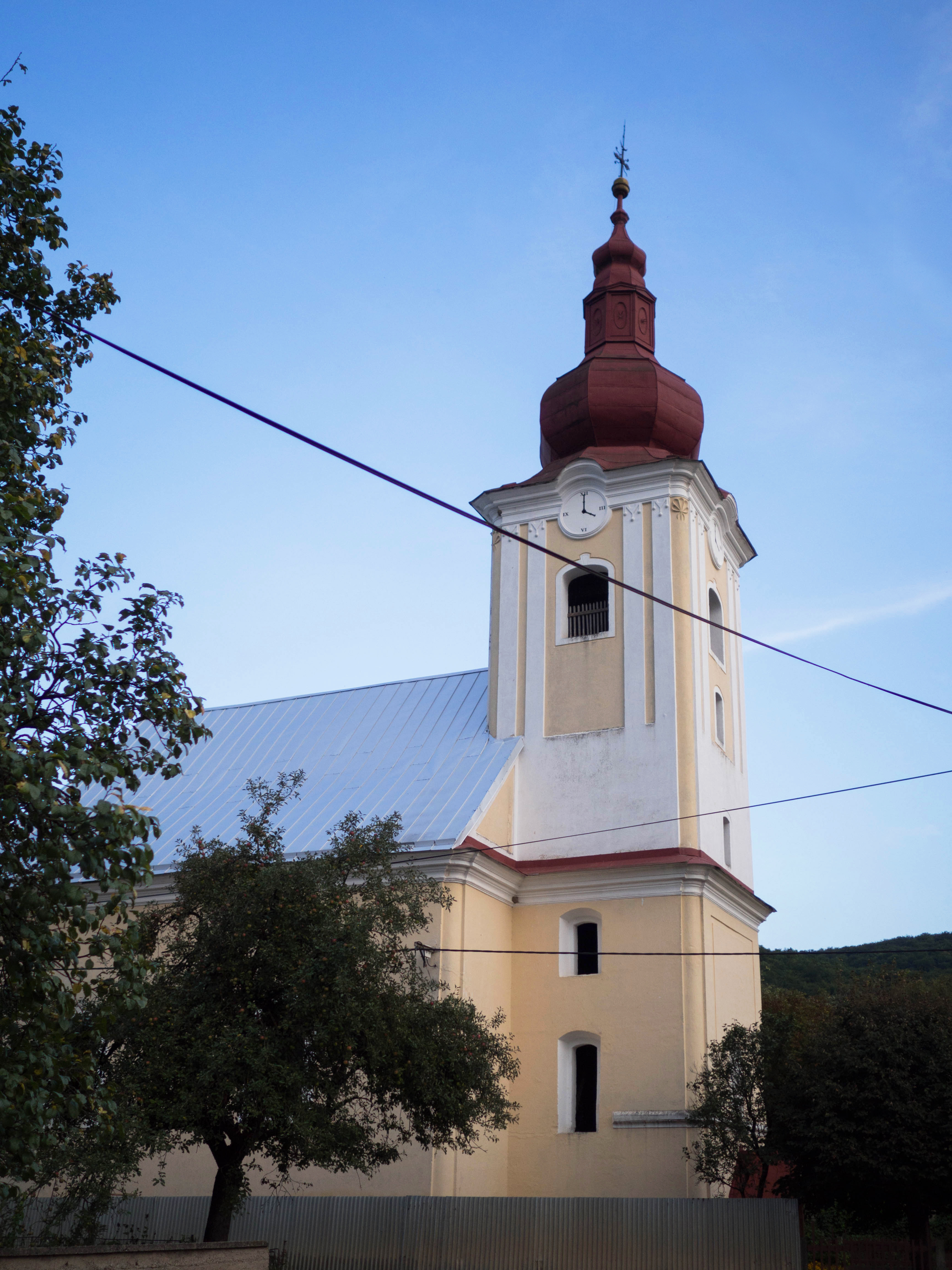
- Lutheran Church

- Flag

- Location of Nandraž in the Banská Bystrica Region Location of Nandraž in Slovakia
- Coordinates: 48.60°N 20.18°E
- Country: Slovakia
- Region: Banská Bystrica Region
- District: Revúca District
- First mentioned: 1318

Area
  - Total: 10.60 km^{2} (4.09 sq mi)
- Elevation: 287 m (942 ft)

Population (2025)
  - Total: 253
- Time zone: UTC+1 (CET)
  - Summer (DST): UTC+2 (CEST)
- Postal code: 496 1
- Area code: +421 58
- Vehicle registration plate (until 2022): RA
- Website: www.nandraz.sk

Nandraž (Hungarian: Nandrás) is a village and municipality in Revúca District in the Banská Bystrica Region of Slovakia.

== Geography ==
The municipality lies at an altitude of 287 metres (942 ft) and covers an area of 10.60 km^{2} (4.09 sq mi) (2025).

== Population ==
Population statistic (10 years)
Year	1995	2005	2015	2025
Count	206	274	283	253
Difference		+33.00%	+3.28%	−10.60%

Population statistic
Year	2024	2025
Count	249	253
Difference		+1.60%

It has a population of 253 people (31 December 2025).

=== Ethnicity ===
Census 2021 (1+ %)
Ethnicity	Number	Fraction
Slovak	255	93.06%
Romani	57	20.8%
Not found out	12	4.37%
Total	274	

In year 2021 was 274 people by ethnicity 255 as Slovak, 57 as Romani, 12 as Not found out and 2 as Hungarian.

Note on population: The difference values of population numbers in the table "Population statistic" and in the sections "Ethnicity" & "Religion" is caused by the use of various statistical methods.

=== Religion ===
Census 2021 (1+ %)
Religion	Number	Fraction
None	159	58.03%
Roman Catholic Church	66	24.09%
Evangelical Church	31	11.31%
Not found out	11	4.01%
Total	274	

In year 2021 was 274 people by religion 159 from None, 66 from Roman Catholic Church, 31 from Evangelical Church, 11 from Not found out, 2 from Greek Catholic Church, 2 from United Methodist Church, 1 from Jehovah's Witnesses, 1 from Islam and 1 from Ad hoc movements.
