= Skerešovo =

Skerešovo Szkáros
- Municipality
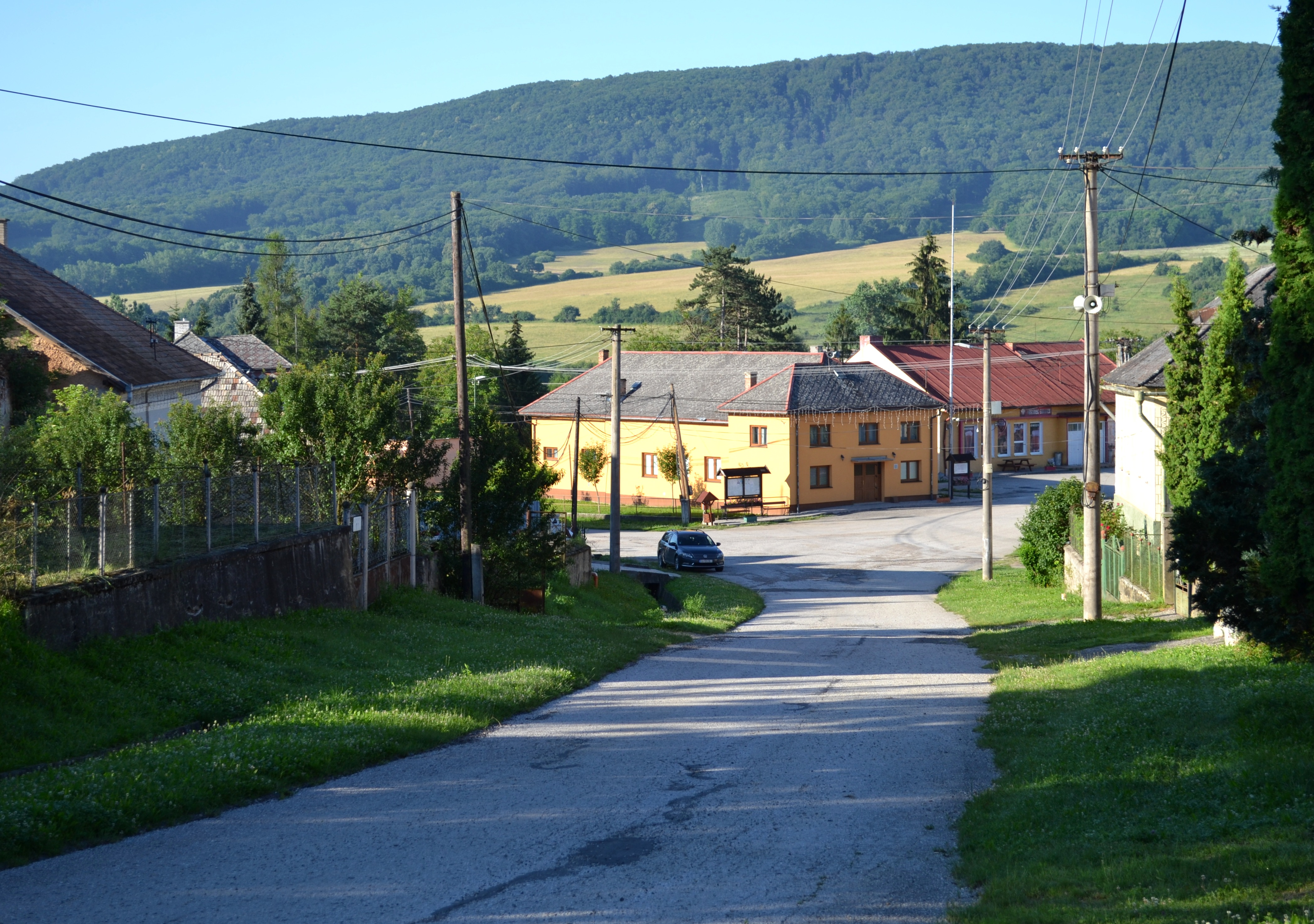

- Flag

- Location of Skerešovo in the Banská Bystrica Region Location of Skerešovo in Slovakia
- Coordinates: 48.52°N 20.20°E
- Country: Slovakia
- Region: Banská Bystrica Region
- District: Revúca District
- First mentioned: 1243

Area
  - Total: 12.90 km^{2} (4.98 sq mi)
- Elevation: 220 m (720 ft)

Population (2025)
  - Total: 215
- Time zone: UTC+1 (CET)
  - Summer (DST): UTC+2 (CEST)
- Postal code: 982 63
- Area code: +421 47
- Vehicle registration plate (until 2022): RA
- Website: www.skeresovo.sk

Skerešovo (Hungarian: Szkáros) is a village and municipality in Revúca District in the Banská Bystrica Region of Slovakia.

== Geography ==
The municipality lies at an altitude of 220 metres (720 ft) and covers an area of 12.90 km^{2} (4.98 sq mi) (2025).

== Population ==
Population statistic (10 years)
Year	1995	2005	2015	2025
Count	261	227	239	215
Difference		−13.02%	+5.28%	−10.04%

Population statistic
Year	2024	2025
Count	210	215
Difference		+2.38%

It has a population of 215 people (31 December 2025).

=== Ethnicity ===
Census 2021 (1+ %)
Ethnicity	Number	Fraction
Slovak	118	54.62%
Hungarian	93	43.05%
Romani	14	6.48%
Not found out	8	3.7%
Total	216	

In year 2021 was 216 people by ethnicity 118 as Slovak, 93 as Hungarian, 14 as Romani, 8 as Not found out, 1 as Czech and 1 as Polish.

Note on population: The difference values of population numbers in the table "Population statistic" and in the sections "Ethnicity" & "Religion" is caused by the use of various statistical methods.

=== Religion ===
Census 2021 (1+ %)
Religion	Number	Fraction
Roman Catholic Church	79	36.57%
Calvinist Church	60	27.78%
None	47	21.76%
Evangelical Church	21	9.72%
Not found out	5	2.31%
Total	216	

In year 2021 was 216 people by religion 79 from Roman Catholic Church, 60 from Calvinist Church, 47 from None, 21 from Evangelical Church, 5 from Not found out, 1 from Jehovah's Witnesses, 1 from Greek Catholic Church, 1 from United Methodist Church and 1 from Ad hoc movements.
