= Pača =

Pača Andrási
- Municipality
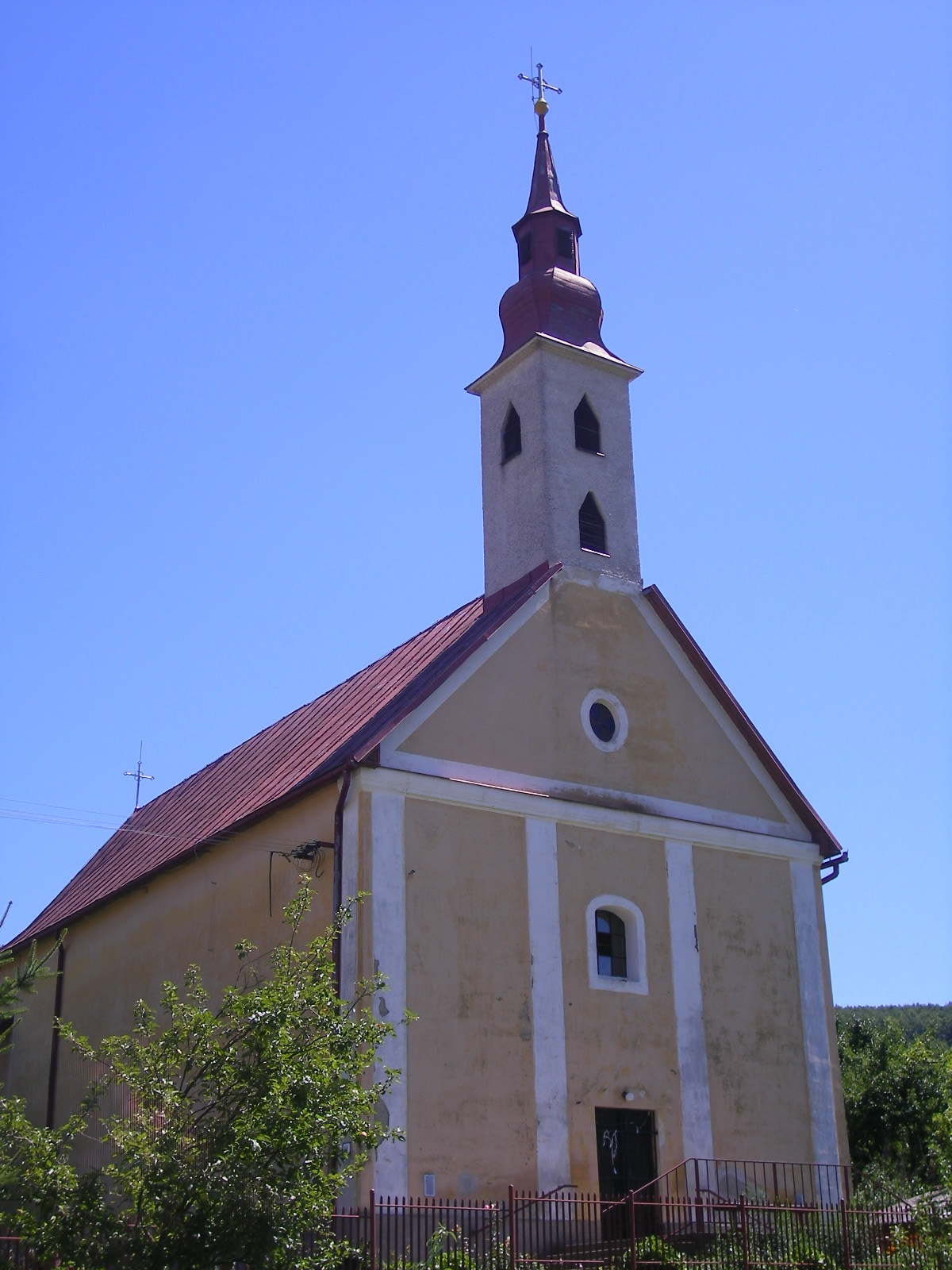

- Flag

- Location of Pača in the Košice Region Location of Pača in Slovakia
- Coordinates: 48.68°N 20.62°E
- Country: Slovakia
- Region: Košice Region
- District: Rožňava District
- First mentioned: 1338

Area
  - Total: 25.57 km^{2} (9.87 sq mi)
- Elevation: 418 m (1,371 ft)

Population (2025)
  - Total: 522
- Time zone: UTC+1 (CET)
  - Summer (DST): UTC+2 (CEST)
- Postal code: 494 1
- Area code: +421 58
- Vehicle registration plate (until 2022): RV
- Website: www.paca.sk

Pača (Hungarian: Andrási) is a village and municipality in the Rožňava District in the Košice Region of middle-eastern Slovakia.

== History ==
In historical records the village was first mentioned in 1338. Before the establishment of independent Czechoslovakia in 1918, Pača was part of Gömör and Kishont County within the Kingdom of Hungary. From 1938 to 1945, it was again part of Hungary as a result of the First Vienna Award.

== Geography ==
The municipality lies at an altitude of 418 metres (1,371 ft) and covers an area of 25.57 km^{2} (9.87 sq mi) (2025).

== Population ==
Population statistic (10 years)
Year	1995	2005	2015	2025
Count	650	653	597	522
Difference		+0.46%	−8.57%	−12.56%

Population statistic
Year	2024	2025
Count	524	522
Difference		−0.38%

It has a population of 522 people (31 December 2025).

=== Ethnicity ===
Census 2021 (1+ %)
Ethnicity	Number	Fraction
Slovak	516	94.85%
Rusyn	25	4.59%
Not found out	20	3.67%
Hungarian	13	2.38%
Total	544	

In year 2021 was 544 people by ethnicity 516 as Slovak, 25 as Rusyn, 20 as Not found out, 13 as Hungarian, 3 as Czech, 1 as Romani and 1 as Russian.

Note on population: The difference values of population numbers in the table "Population statistic" and in the sections "Ethnicity" & "Religion" is caused by the use of various statistical methods.

=== Religion ===
Census 2021 (1+ %)
Religion	Number	Fraction
Roman Catholic Church	322	59.19%
None	147	27.02%
Not found out	25	4.6%
Evangelical Church	24	4.41%
Greek Catholic Church	11	2.02%
Calvinist Church	6	1.1%
Total	544	

In year 2021 was 544 people by religion 322 from Roman Catholic Church, 147 from None, 25 from Not found out, 24 from Evangelical Church, 11 from Greek Catholic Church, 6 from Calvinist Church, 4 from Ad hoc movements, 2 from Other and not ascertained christian church, 1 from Other, 1 from United Methodist Church and 1 from Seventh-day Adventist Church.

== Culture ==
The village has a public library and a football pitch.
