= Licince =

Village and municipality in Slovakia

Licince Lice
- Municipality
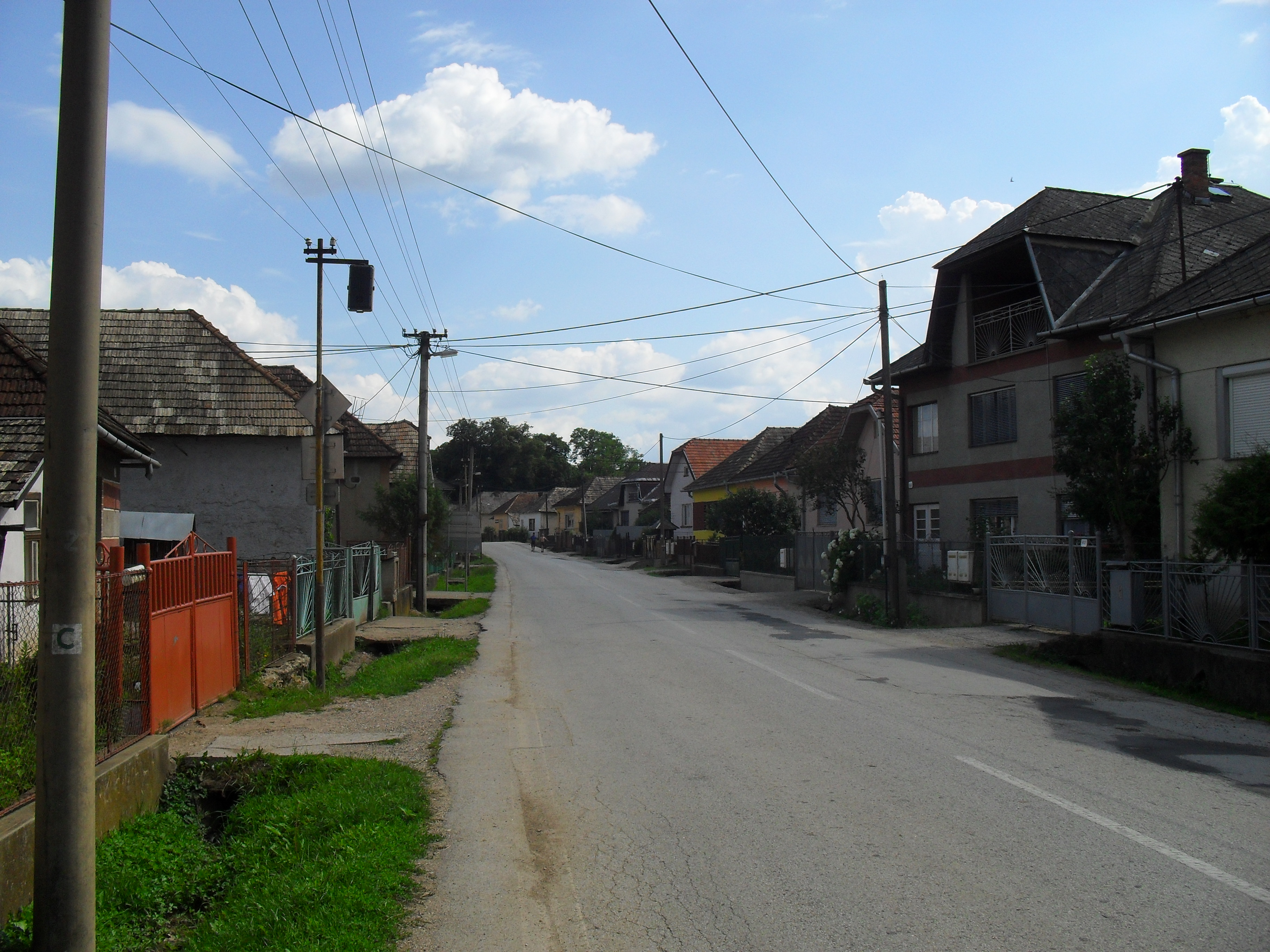

- Flag

- Location of Licince in the Banská Bystrica Region Location of Licince in Slovakia
- Coordinates: 48.53°N 20.30°E
- Country: Slovakia
- Region: Banská Bystrica Region
- District: Revúca District
- First mentioned: 1243

Area
  - Total: 18.27 km^{2} (7.05 sq mi)
- Elevation: 210 m (690 ft)

Population (2025)
  - Total: 806
- Time zone: UTC+1 (CET)
  - Summer (DST): UTC+2 (CEST)
- Postal code: 491 4
- Area code: +421 58
- Vehicle registration plate (until 2022): RA
- Website: www.obec-licince.sk

Licince (Hungarian: Lice) is a village and municipality in the Revúca District of the Banská Bystrica Region of Slovakia.

== Geography ==
The municipality lies at an altitude of 210 metres (690 ft) and covers an area of 18.27 km^{2} (7.05 sq mi) (2025).

== Population ==
Population statistic (10 years)
Year	1995	2005	2015	2025
Count	551	707	765	806
Difference		+28.31%	+8.20%	+5.35%

Population statistic
Year	2024	2025
Count	793	806
Difference		+1.63%

It has a population of 806 people (31 December 2025).

=== Ethnicity ===
Census 2021 (1+ %)
Ethnicity	Number	Fraction
Slovak	545	68.55%
Hungarian	239	30.06%
Romani	51	6.41%
Not found out	32	4.02%
Total	795	

In year 2021 was 795 people by ethnicity 545 as Slovak, 239 as Hungarian, 51 as Romani, 32 as Not found out and 1 as Czech.

Note on population: The difference values of population numbers in the table "Population statistic" and in the sections "Ethnicity" & "Religion" is caused by the use of various statistical methods.

=== Religion ===
Census 2021 (1+ %)
Religion	Number	Fraction
Roman Catholic Church	443	55.72%
None	216	27.17%
Evangelical Church	51	6.42%
Not found out	22	2.77%
Calvinist Church	13	1.64%
Christian Congregations in Slovakia	12	1.51%
Greek Catholic Church	11	1.38%
Total	795	

In year 2021 was 795 people by religion 443 from Roman Catholic Church, 216 from None, 51 from Evangelical Church, 22 from Not found out, 13 from Calvinist Church, 12 from Christian Congregations in Slovakia, 11 from Greek Catholic Church, 5 from Jehovah's Witnesses, 5 from United Methodist Church, 4 from Other and not ascertained christian church, 4 from Other, 4 from Apostolic Church, 3 from Church of Jesus Christ of Latter-day Saints and 2 from Church of the Brethren.
