= Brdárka =

- Municipality
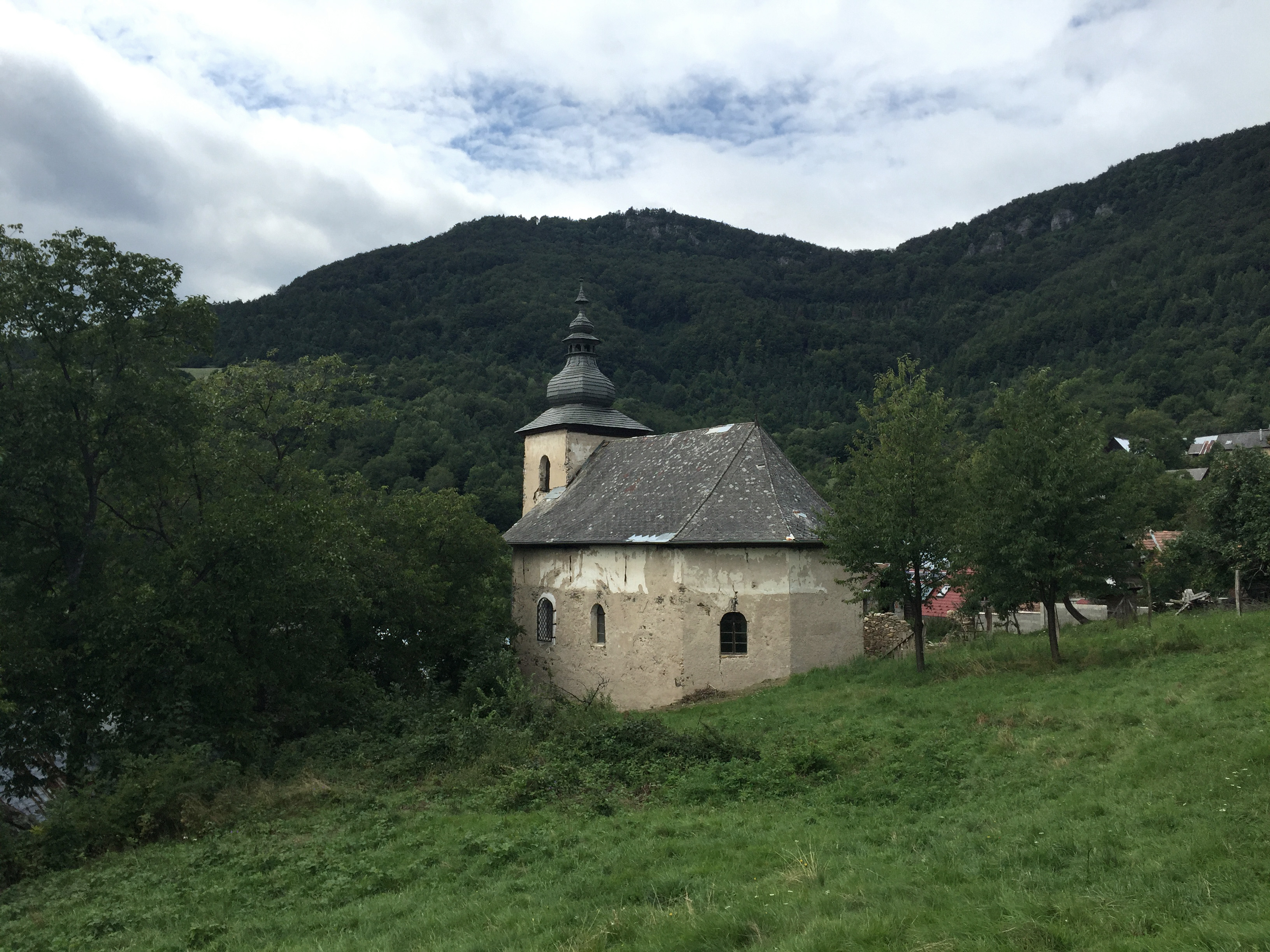

- Flag

- Location of Brdárka in the Košice Region Location of Brdárka in Slovakia
- Coordinates: 48.77°N 20.33°E
- Country: Slovakia
- Region: Košice Region
- District: Rožňava District
- First mentioned: 1556

Government
  - Mayor: Jaroslav Hric Jančo (Ind.)

Area
  - Total: 6.13 km^{2} (2.37 sq mi)
- Elevation: 569 m (1,867 ft)

Population (2025)
  - Total: 59
- Time zone: UTC+1 (CET)
  - Summer (DST): UTC+2 (CEST)
- Postal code: 493 4
- Area code: +421 58
- Vehicle registration plate (until 2022): RV
- Website: obecbrdarka.webnode.sk

Brdárka (Hungarian: Berdárka, German: Bredersdorf) is a village and municipality in the Rožňava District in the Košice Region of eastern Slovakia.

== Geography ==
The municipality lies at an altitude of 569 metres (1,867 ft) and covers an area of 6.13 km^{2} (2.37 sq mi) (2025).

== History ==
Before the establishment of independent Czechoslovakia in 1918, Brdárka was part of Gömör and Kishont County within the Kingdom of Hungary. From 1939 to 1945, it was part of the Slovak Republic.

== Genealogical resources ==
The records for genealogical research are available at the state archive "Statny Archiv in Banska Bystrica, Kosice, Slovakia"

- Greek Catholic church records (births/marriages/deaths): 1818-1895 (parish B)
- Lutheran church records (births/marriages/deaths): 1744-1952 (parish B)

== Population ==
Population statistic (10 years)
Year	1995	2005	2015	2025
Count	63	60	62	59
Difference		−4.76%	+3.33%	−4.83%

Population statistic
Year	2024	2025
Count	61	59
Difference		−3.27%

It has a population of 59 people (31 December 2025).

=== Ethnicity ===
Census 2021 (1+ %)
Ethnicity	Number	Fraction
Slovak	61	96.82%
Not found out	1	1.58%
Hungarian	1	1.58%
Other	1	1.58%
Total	63	

In year 2021 was 63 people by ethnicity 61 as Slovak, 1 as Not found out, 1 as Hungarian and 1 as Other.

Note on population: The difference values of population numbers in the table "Population statistic" and in the sections "Ethnicity" & "Religion" is caused by the use of various statistical methods.

=== Religion ===
Census 2021 (1+ %)
Religion	Number	Fraction
None	28	44.44%
Evangelical Church	24	38.1%
Roman Catholic Church	6	9.52%
Other	3	4.76%
Other and not ascertained christian church	1	1.59%
Not found out	1	1.59%
Total	63	

In year 2021 was 63 people by religion 28 from None, 24 from Evangelical Church, 6 from Roman Catholic Church, 3 from Other, 1 from Other and not ascertained christian church and 1 from Not found out.

== See also ==
- List of municipalities and towns in Slovakia
