= Bohúňovo =

Bohúňovo Lekenye
- Municipality
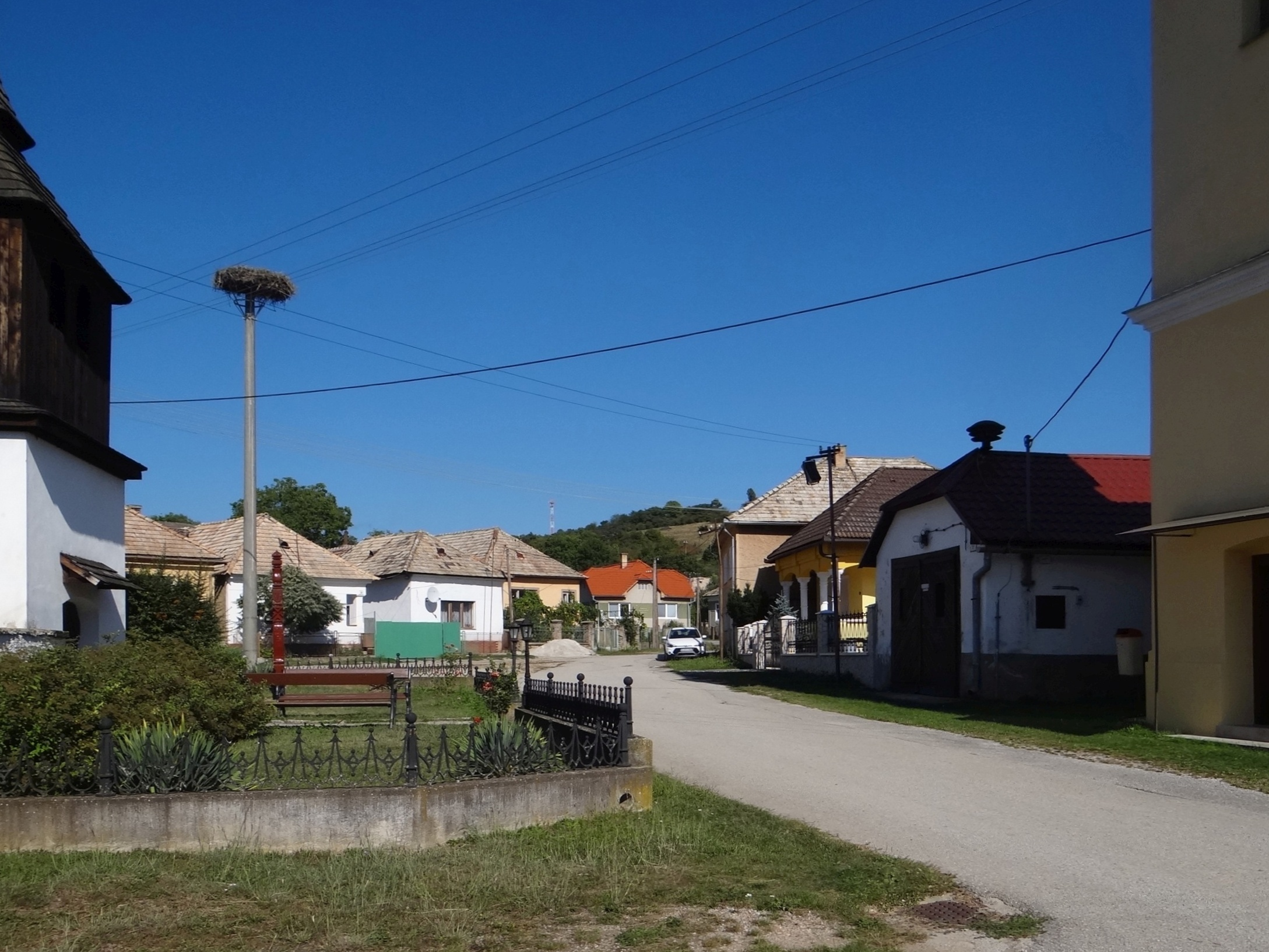

- Flag Coat of arms

- Location of Bohúňovo in the Košice Region Location of Bohúňovo in Slovakia
- Coordinates: 48.51°N 20.38°E
- Country: Slovakia
- Region: Košice Region
- District: Rožňava District
- First mentioned: 1243

Area
  - Total: 6.80 km^{2} (2.63 sq mi)
- Elevation: 210 m (690 ft)

Population (2025)
  - Total: 257
- Time zone: UTC+1 (CET)
  - Summer (DST): UTC+2 (CEST)
- Postal code: 491 2
- Area code: +421 58
- Vehicle registration plate (until 2022): RV
- Website: www.bohunovo.sk

Bohúňovo (Hungarian: Lekenye) is a village and municipality in the Rožňava District in the Košice Region of eastern Slovakia

== Geography ==
The municipality lies at an altitude of 210 metres (690 ft) and covers an area of 6.80 km^{2} (2.63 sq mi) (2025).

== History ==
Before the establishment of independent Czechoslovakia in 1918, Bohúňovo was part of Gömör and Kishont County within the Kingdom of Hungary. From 1938 to 1945, it was again part of Hungary as a result of the First Vienna Award.

== Population ==
Population statistic (10 years)
Year	1995	2005	2015	2025
Count	328	315	284	257
Difference		−3.96%	−9.84%	−9.50%

Population statistic
Year	2024	2025
Count	266	257
Difference		−3.38%

It has a population of 257 people (31 December 2025).

=== Ethnicity ===
Census 2021 (1+ %)
Ethnicity	Number	Fraction
Hungarian	211	74.82%
Slovak	76	26.95%
Not found out	11	3.9%
Ukrainian	3	1.06%
Total	282	

In year 2021 was 282 people by ethnicity 211 as Hungarian, 76 as Slovak, 11 as Not found out, 3 as Ukrainian, 2 as Romani, 1 as Czech, 1 as Vietnamese, 1 as Russian and 1 as Albanian.

Note on population: The difference values of population numbers in the table "Population statistic" and in the sections "Ethnicity" & "Religion" is caused by the use of various statistical methods.

=== Religion ===
Census 2021 (1+ %)
Religion	Number	Fraction
None	83	29.43%
Evangelical Church	76	26.95%
Roman Catholic Church	52	18.44%
Calvinist Church	49	17.38%
Not found out	12	4.26%
Jehovah's Witnesses	3	1.06%
United Methodist Church	3	1.06%
Total	282	

In year 2021 was 282 people by religion 83 from None, 76 from Evangelical Church, 52 from Roman Catholic Church, 49 from Calvinist Church, 12 from Not found out, 3 from Jehovah's Witnesses, 3 from United Methodist Church, 2 from Other and not ascertained christian church, 1 from Old Catholic Church and 1 from Buddhism.

== Genealogical resources ==
The records for genealogical research are available at the state archive "Statny Archiv in Banska Bystrica, Slovakia"

- Roman Catholic church records (births/marriages/deaths): 1825-1896 (parish B)
- Lutheran church records (births/marriages/deaths): 1805-1908 (parish B)
- Reformated church records (births/marriages/deaths): 1792-1904 (parish B)

== See also ==
- List of municipalities and towns in Slovakia
