= Kováčová, Rožňava District =

Village and municipality in Slovakia

Kováčová Kiskovácsvágása
- Municipality
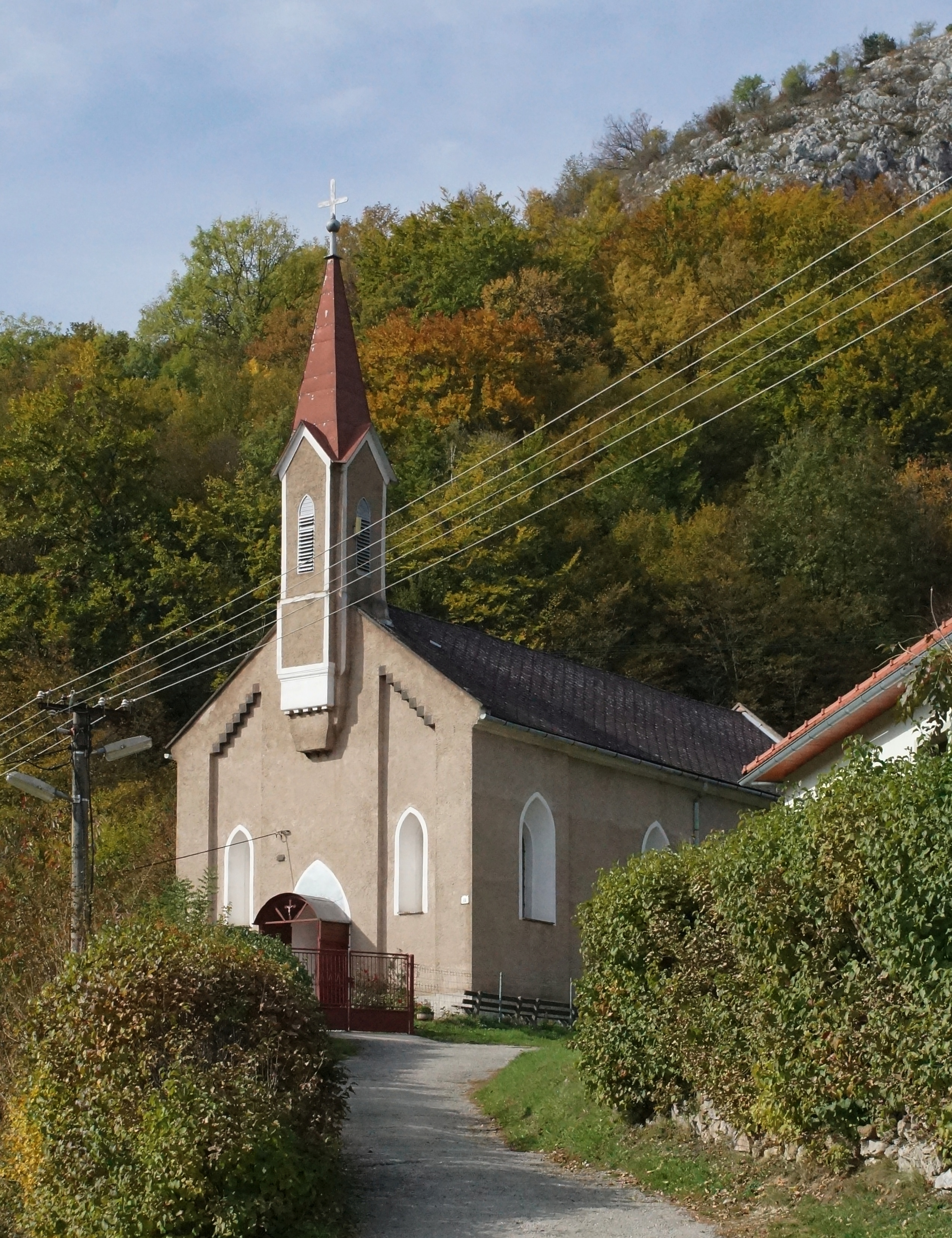

- Flag

- Location of Kováčová in the Košice Region Location of Kováčová in Slovakia
- Coordinates: 48.64°N 20.70°E
- Country: Slovakia
- Region: Košice Region
- District: Rožňava District
- First mentioned: 1254

Area
  - Total: 13.81 km^{2} (5.33 sq mi)
- Elevation: 444 m (1,457 ft)

Population (2025)
  - Total: 57
- Time zone: UTC+1 (CET)
  - Summer (DST): UTC+2 (CEST)
- Postal code: 494 2
- Area code: +421 58
- Vehicle registration plate (until 2022): RV
- Website: www.obeckovacova.sk

Kováčová (Hungarian: Kiskovácsvágása) is a village and municipality in the Rožňava District in the Košice Region of middle-eastern Slovakia.

== History ==
In historical records the village was first mentioned in 1254. Before the establishment of independent Czechoslovakia in 1918, Kováčová was part of Gömör and Kishont County within the Kingdom of Hungary. From 1938 to 1945, it was again part of Hungary as a result of the First Vienna Award.

== Geography ==
The municipality lies at an altitude of 444 metres (1,457 ft) and covers an area of 13.81 km^{2} (5.33 sq mi) (2025).

== Population ==
Population statistic (10 years)
Year	1995	2005	2015	2025
Count	117	89	58	57
Difference		−23.93%	−34.83%	−1.72%

Population statistic
Year	2024	2025
Count	60	57
Difference		−5%

It has a population of 57 people (31 December 2025).

=== Ethnicity ===
Census 2021 (1+ %)
Ethnicity	Number	Fraction
Hungarian	32	56.14%
Slovak	25	43.85%
Not found out	1	1.75%
Total	57	

In year 2021 was 57 people by ethnicity 32 as Hungarian, 25 as Slovak and 1 as Not found out.

Note on population: The difference values of population numbers in the table "Population statistic" and in the sections "Ethnicity" & "Religion" is caused by the use of various statistical methods.

=== Religion ===
Census 2021 (1+ %)
Religion	Number	Fraction
Roman Catholic Church	40	70.18%
None	10	17.54%
Calvinist Church	4	7.02%
Jehovah's Witnesses	3	5.26%
Total	57	

In year 2021 was 57 people by religion 40 from Roman Catholic Church, 10 from None, 4 from Calvinist Church and 3 from Jehovah's Witnesses.

== Culture ==
The village has a public library.

== Genealogical resources ==
The records for genealogical research are available at the state archive "Statny Archiv in Kosice, Slovakia"

- Roman Catholic church records (births/marriages/deaths): 1732-1895 (parish B)

== See also ==
- List of municipalities and towns in Slovakia
