= Silická Brezová =

Silická Brezová Szádvárborsa
- Municipality
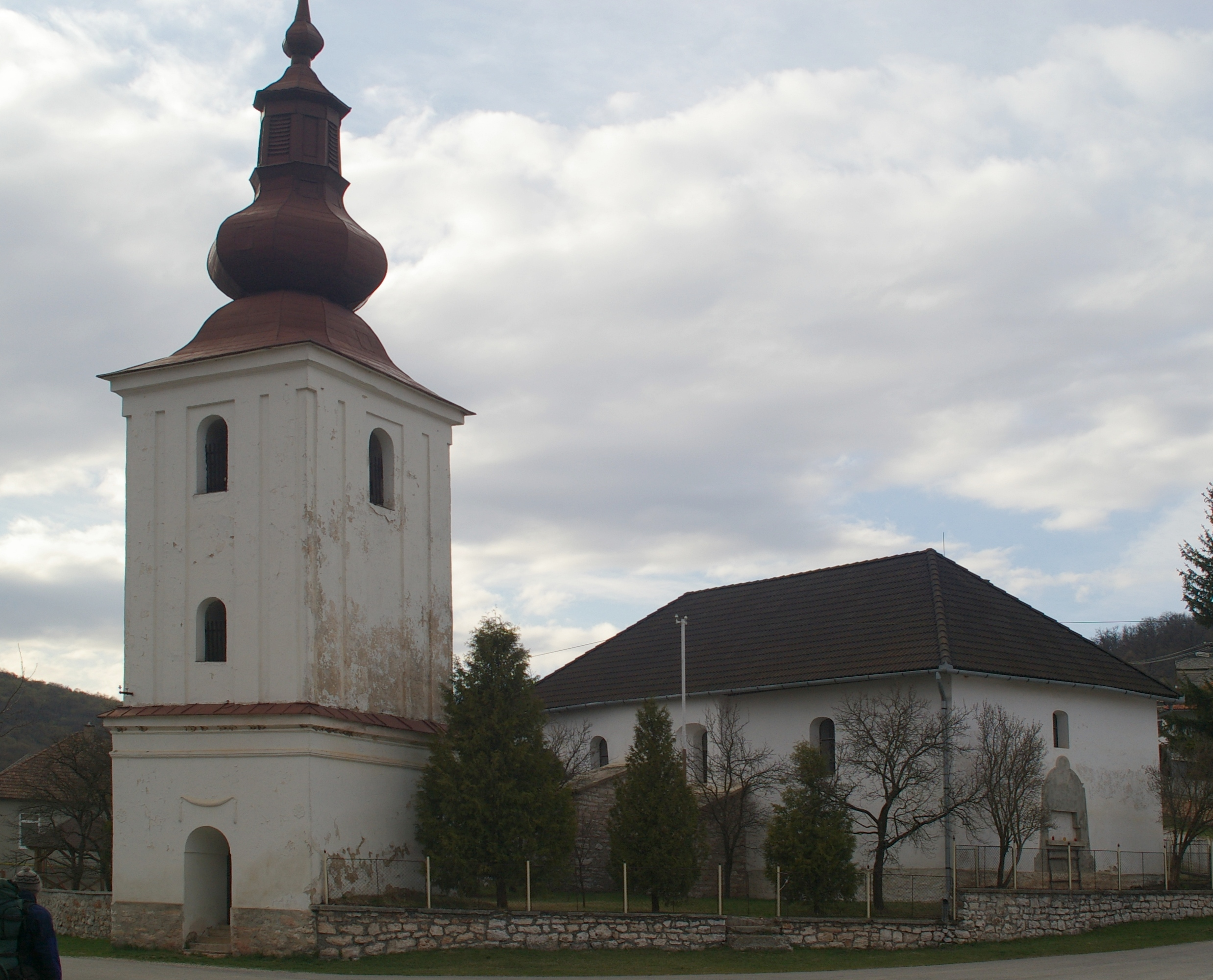

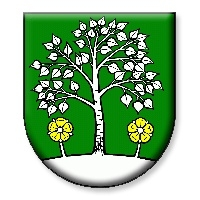
- Flag Coat of arms

- Location of Silická Brezová in the Košice Region Location of Silická Brezová in Slovakia
- Coordinates: 48.53°N 20.48°E
- Country: Slovakia
- Region: Košice Region
- District: Rožňava District
- First mentioned: 1399

Area
  - Total: 13.36 km^{2} (5.16 sq mi)
- Elevation: 430 m (1,410 ft)

Population (2025)
  - Total: 127
- Time zone: UTC+1 (CET)
  - Summer (DST): UTC+2 (CEST)
- Postal code: 491 1
- Area code: +421 58
- Vehicle registration plate (until 2022): RV
- Website: www.silickabrezova.sk

Silická Brezová (Hungarian: Szádvárborsa) is a village and municipality in the Rožňava District in the Košice Region of middle-eastern Slovakia.

== History ==
In historical records the village was first mentioned in 1399. Before the establishment of independent Czechoslovakia in 1918, Silická Brezová was part of Gömör and Kishont County within the Kingdom of Hungary. From 1938 to 1945, it was again part of Hungary as a result of the First Vienna Award.

== Geography ==
The municipality lies at an altitude of 430 metres (1,410 ft) and covers an area of 13.36 km^{2} (5.16 sq mi) (2025).

== Population ==
Population statistic (10 years)
| Year | 1995 | 2005 | 2015 | 2025 |
|---|---|---|---|---|
| Count | 207 | 190 | 158 | 127 |
| Difference | | −8.21% | −16.84% | −19.62% |

Population statistic
| Year | 2024 | 2025 |
|---|---|---|
| Count | 130 | 127 |
| Difference | | −2.30% |

It has a population of 127 people (31 December 2025).

=== Ethnicity ===
Census 2021 (1+ %)
| Ethnicity | Number | Fraction |
|---|---|---|
| Hungarian | 103 | 72.53% |
| Slovak | 41 | 28.87% |
| Total | 142 | |

In year 2021 was 142 people by ethnicity 103 as Hungarian, 41 as Slovak, 1 as Ukrainian, 1 as Romani and 1 as Not found out.

Note on population: The difference values of population numbers in the table "Population statistic" and in the sections "Ethnicity" & "Religion" is caused by the use of various statistical methods.

=== Religion ===
Census 2021 (1+ %)
| Religion | Number | Fraction |
|---|---|---|
| Calvinist Church | 64 | 45.07% |
| None | 56 | 39.44% |
| Evangelical Church | 10 | 7.04% |
| Roman Catholic Church | 5 | 3.52% |
| Jehovah's Witnesses | 4 | 2.82% |
| Total | 142 | |

In year 2021 was 142 people by religion 64 from Calvinist Church, 56 from None, 10 from Evangelical Church, 5 from Roman Catholic Church, 4 from Jehovah's Witnesses, 1 from Eastern Orthodox Church, 1 from Greek Catholic Church and 1 from United Methodist Church.

== Culture ==
The village has a public library.
