= Drnava =

Village and municipality in Slovakia

Drnava Dernő
- Municipality
- Flag

- Location of Drnava in the Košice Region Location of Drnava in Slovakia
- Coordinates: 48.65°N 20.67°E
- Country: Slovakia
- Region: Košice Region
- District: Rožňava District
- First mentioned: 1364

Area
  - Total: 26.89 km^{2} (10.38 sq mi)
- Elevation: 376 m (1,234 ft)

Population (2025)
  - Total: 691
- Time zone: UTC+1 (CET)
  - Summer (DST): UTC+2 (CEST)
- Postal code: 494 2
- Area code: +421 58
- Vehicle registration plate (until 2022): RV
- Website: www.obecdrnava.sk

Drnava (Hungarian: Dernő, German: Dernau) is a village and municipality in the Rožňava District in the Košice Region of eastern Slovakia.

== History ==
In historical records the village was first mentioned in 1364. Before the establishment of independent Czechoslovakia in 1918, Drnava was part of Gömör and Kishont County within the Kingdom of Hungary. From 1938 to 1945, it was again part of Hungary as a result of the First Vienna Award.

== Geography ==
The municipality lies at an altitude of 376 metres (1,234 ft) and covers an area of 26.89 km^{2} (10.38 sq mi) (2025).

== Population ==
Population statistic (10 years)
Year	1995	2005	2015	2025
Count	666	670	719	691
Difference		+0.60%	+7.31%	−3.89%

Population statistic
Year	2024	2025
Count	689	691
Difference		+0.29%

It has a population of 691 people (31 December 2025).

=== Ethnicity ===
Census 2021 (1+ %)
Ethnicity	Number	Fraction
Hungarian	345	48.59%
Slovak	241	33.94%
Romani	175	24.64%
Not found out	16	2.25%
Total	710	

In year 2021 was 710 people by ethnicity 345 as Hungarian, 241 as Slovak, 175 as Romani, 16 as Not found out, 2 as Czech and 1 as Vietnamese.

Note on population: The difference values of population numbers in the table "Population statistic" and in the sections "Ethnicity" & "Religion" is caused by the use of various statistical methods.

=== Religion ===
Census 2021 (1+ %)
Religion	Number	Fraction
Roman Catholic Church	520	73.24%
None	101	14.23%
Calvinist Church	43	6.06%
Evangelical Church	16	2.25%
Greek Catholic Church	14	1.97%
Not found out	12	1.69%
Total	710	

In year 2021 was 710 people by religion 520 from Roman Catholic Church, 101 from None, 43 from Calvinist Church, 16 from Evangelical Church, 14 from Greek Catholic Church, 12 from Not found out, 1 from Eastern Orthodox Church, 1 from Other and not ascertained christian church, 1 from Christian Congregations in Slovakia and 1 from United Methodist Church.

== Culture ==
The village has a small public library, a gymnasium, a football pitch and a food store.

== Genealogical resources ==
The records for genealogical research are available at the state archive "Statny Archiv in Kosice, Slovakia"

- Roman Catholic church records (births/marriages/deaths): 1732-1905 (parish B)

== See also ==
- List of municipalities and towns in Slovakia
