= Markuška =

Village and municipality in Slovakia

Markuška Márkuska
- Municipality
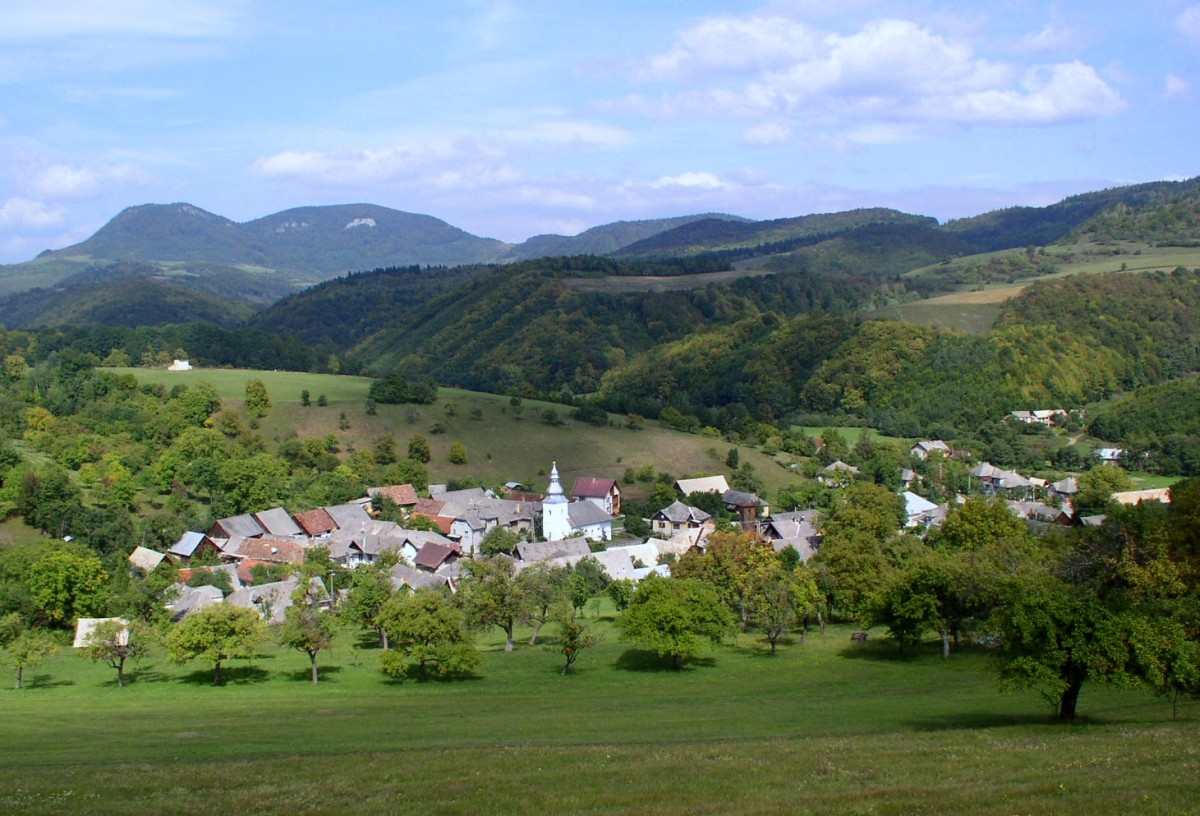

- Flag

- Location of Markuška in the Košice Region Location of Markuška in Slovakia
- Coordinates: 48.73°N 20.32°E
- Country: Slovakia
- Region: Košice Region
- District: Rožňava District
- First mentioned: 1311

Area
  - Total: 6.80 km^{2} (2.63 sq mi)
- Elevation: 381 m (1,250 ft)

Population (2025)
  - Total: 154
- Time zone: UTC+1 (CET)
  - Summer (DST): UTC+2 (CEST)
- Postal code: 493 4
- Area code: +421 58
- Vehicle registration plate (until 2022): RV
- Website: obecmarkuska.sk

Markuška (Hungarian: Márkuska) is a village and municipality in the Rožňava District in the Košice Region of middle-eastern Slovakia.

== History ==
In historical records the village was first mentioned in 1311. Before the establishment of independent Czechoslovakia in 1918, Markuška was part of Gömör and Kishont County within the Kingdom of Hungary. From 1939 to 1945, it was part of the Slovak Republic.

== Geography ==
The municipality lies at an altitude of 381 metres (1,250 ft) and covers an area of 6.80 km^{2} (2.63 sq mi) (2025).

== Population ==
Population statistic (10 years)
Year	1995	2005	2015	2025
Count	177	182	160	154
Difference		+2.82%	−12.08%	−3.75%

Population statistic
Year	2024	2025
Count	147	154
Difference		+4.76%

It has a population of 154 people (31 December 2025).

=== Ethnicity ===
Census 2021 (1+ %)
Ethnicity	Number	Fraction
Slovak	148	98.66%
Not found out	3	2%
Total	150	

In year 2021 was 150 people by ethnicity 148 as Slovak, 3 as Not found out and 1 as Jewish.

Note on population: The difference values of population numbers in the table "Population statistic" and in the sections "Ethnicity" & "Religion" is caused by the use of various statistical methods.

=== Religion ===
Census 2021 (1+ %)
Religion	Number	Fraction
Evangelical Church	114	76%
None	18	12%
Roman Catholic Church	6	4%
Greek Catholic Church	6	4%
Seventh-day Adventist Church	5	3.33%
Total	150	

In year 2021 was 150 people by religion 114 from Evangelical Church, 18 from None, 6 from Roman Catholic Church, 6 from Greek Catholic Church, 5 from Seventh-day Adventist Church and 1 from Not found out.

== Culture ==
The village has a public library.
