= Rochovce =

Rochovce Rozsfalva
- Municipality
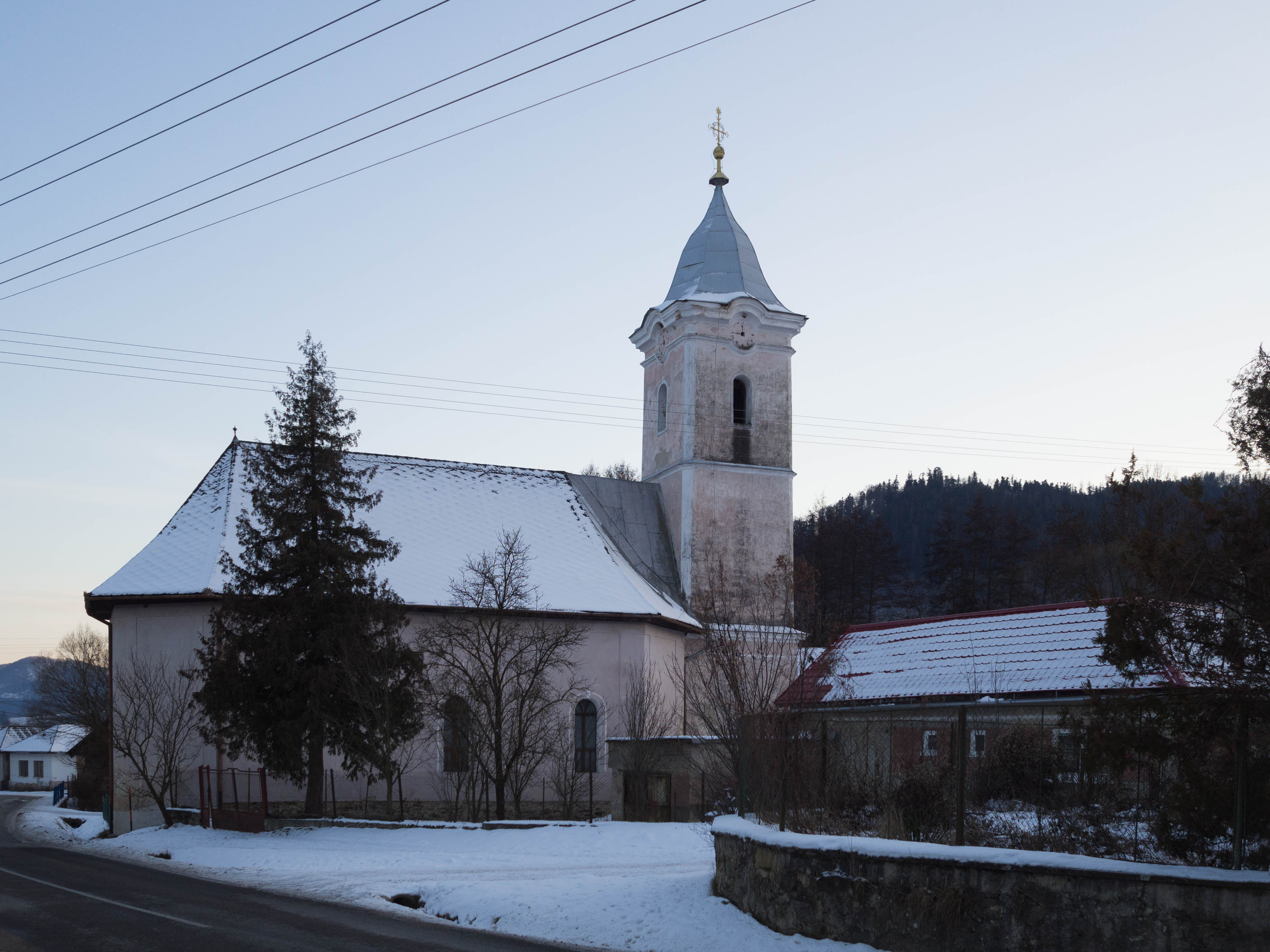

- Flag

- Location of Rochovce in the Košice Region Location of Rochovce in Slovakia
- Coordinates: 48°42′9″N 20°18′0″E
- Country: Slovakia
- Region: Košice Region
- District: Rožňava District
- First mentioned: 1318

Area
  - Total: 8.33 km^{2} (3.22 sq mi)
- Elevation: 371 m (1,217 ft)

Population (2025)
  - Total: 362
- Time zone: UTC+1 (CET)
  - Summer (DST): UTC+2 (CEST)
- Postal code: 493 6
- Area code: +421 58
- Vehicle registration plate (until 2022): RV
- Website: www.rochovce.sk

Rochovce (Hungarian: Rozsfalva) is a village and large municipality in the Rožňava District in the Košice Region of middle-eastern Slovakia.

== History ==
In historical records the village was first mentioned in 1318. Before the establishment of independent Czechoslovakia in 1918, Rochovce was part of Gömör and Kishont County within the Kingdom of Hungary. From 1939 to 1945, it was part of the Slovak Republic.

== Geography ==
The municipality lies at an altitude of 371 metres (1,217 ft) and covers an area of 8.33 km^{2} (3.22 sq mi) (2025).

== Population ==
Population statistic (10 years)
Year	1995	2005	2015	2025
Count	306	333	342	362
Difference		+8.82%	+2.70%	+5.84%

Population statistic
Year	2024	2025
Count	366	362
Difference		−1.09%

It has a population of 362 people (31 December 2025).

=== Ethnicity ===
Census 2021 (1+ %)
Ethnicity	Number	Fraction
Slovak	308	95.06%
Not found out	11	3.39%
Hungarian	8	2.46%
Romani	4	1.23%
Total	324	

In year 2021 was 324 people by ethnicity 308 as Slovak, 11 as Not found out, 8 as Hungarian, 4 as Romani and 3 as Czech.

Note on population: The difference values of population numbers in the table "Population statistic" and in the sections "Ethnicity" & "Religion" is caused by the use of various statistical methods.

=== Religion ===
Census 2021 (1+ %)
Religion	Number	Fraction
None	163	50.31%
Evangelical Church	116	35.8%
Roman Catholic Church	20	6.17%
Not found out	18	5.56%
Total	324	

In year 2021 was 324 people by religion 163 from None, 116 from Evangelical Church, 20 from Roman Catholic Church, 18 from Not found out, 3 from Apostolic Church, 2 from Greek Catholic Church, 1 from Other and not ascertained christian church and 1 from Seventh-day Adventist Church.

== Culture ==
The village has a public library.
