= Slavoška =

Slavoška Kisszabos
- Municipality
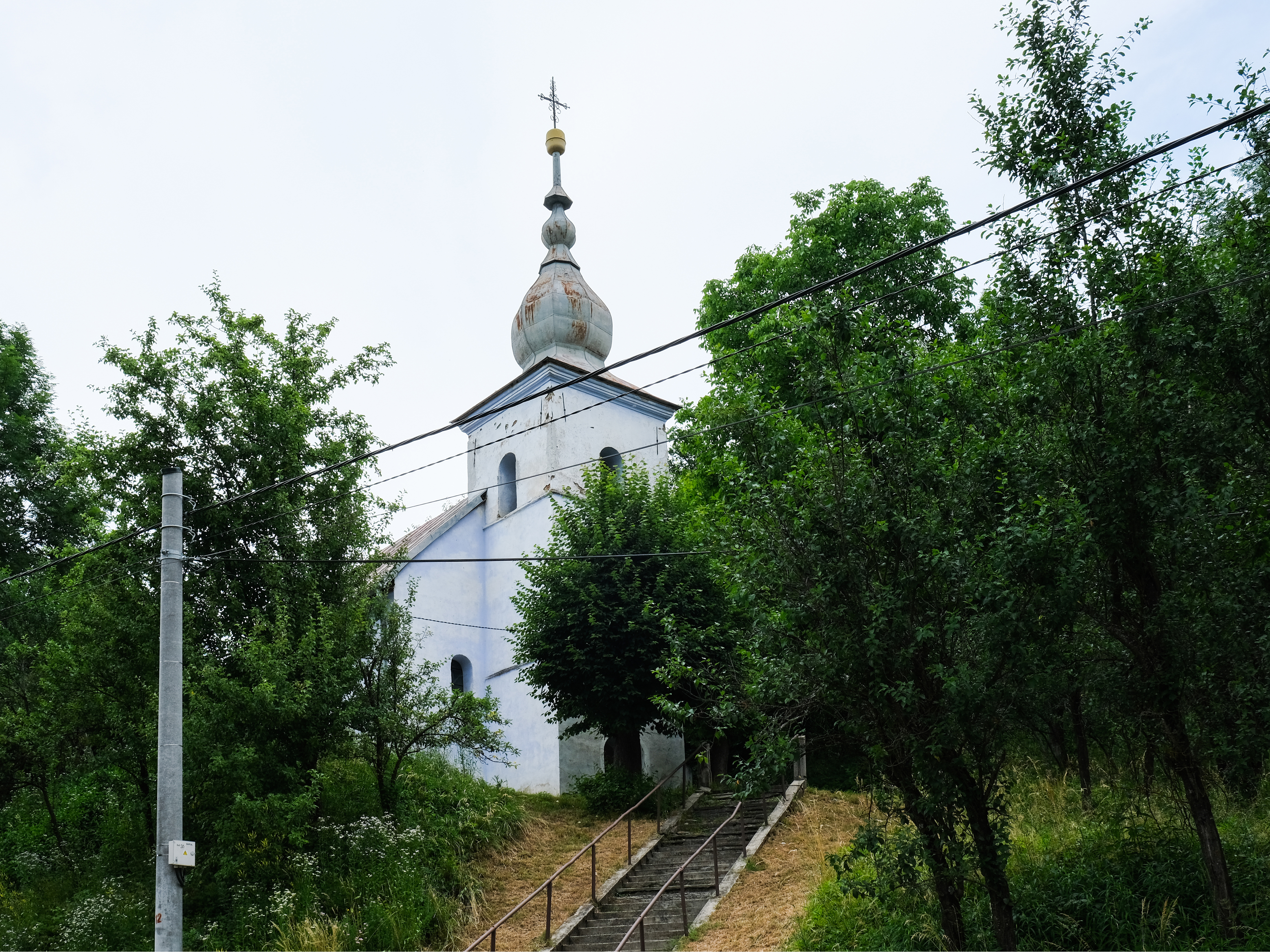

- Flag

- Location of Slavoška in the Košice Region Location of Slavoška in Slovakia
- Coordinates: 48.73°N 20.35°E
- Country: Slovakia
- Region: Košice Region
- District: Rožňava District
- First mentioned: 1563

Area
  - Total: 4.37 km^{2} (1.69 sq mi)
- Elevation: 423 m (1,388 ft)

Population (2025)
  - Total: 140
- Time zone: UTC+1 (CET)
  - Summer (DST): UTC+2 (CEST)
- Postal code: 493 4
- Area code: +421 58
- Vehicle registration plate (until 2022): RV
- Website: obecslavoska.webnode.sk

Slavoška (Hungarian: Kisszabos) is a small village and municipality in the Rožňava District in the Košice Region of middle-eastern Slovakia.

== History ==
In historical records the village was first mentioned in 1563. Before the establishment of independent Czechoslovakia in 1918, Slavoška was part of Gömör and Kishont County within the Kingdom of Hungary. From 1939 to 1945, it was part of the Slovak Republic.

== Geography ==
The municipality lies at an altitude of 423 metres (1,388 ft) and covers an area of 4.37 km^{2} (1.69 sq mi) (2025).

== Population ==
Population statistic (10 years)
Year	1995	2005	2015	2025
Count	131	124	130	140
Difference		−5.34%	+4.83%	+7.69%

Population statistic
Year	2024	2025
Count	139	140
Difference		+0.71%

It has a population of 140 people (31 December 2025).

=== Ethnicity ===
Census 2021 (1+ %)
Ethnicity	Number	Fraction
Slovak	128	96.96%
Romani	12	9.09%
Rusyn	3	2.27%
Czech	2	1.51%
Total	132	

In year 2021 was 132 people by ethnicity 128 as Slovak, 12 as Romani, 3 as Rusyn, 2 as Czech and 1 as Not found out.

Note on population: The difference values of population numbers in the table "Population statistic" and in the sections "Ethnicity" & "Religion" is caused by the use of various statistical methods.

=== Religion ===
Census 2021 (1+ %)
Religion	Number	Fraction
None	68	51.52%
Evangelical Church	55	41.67%
Greek Catholic Church	4	3.03%
Roman Catholic Church	3	2.27%
Total	132	

In year 2021 was 132 people by religion 68 from None, 55 from Evangelical Church, 4 from Greek Catholic Church, 3 from Roman Catholic Church, 1 from Not found out and 1 from United Methodist Church.

== Culture ==
The village has a public library.
