= Čučma =

Village and municipality in Slovakia

Čučma Csucsom
- Municipality
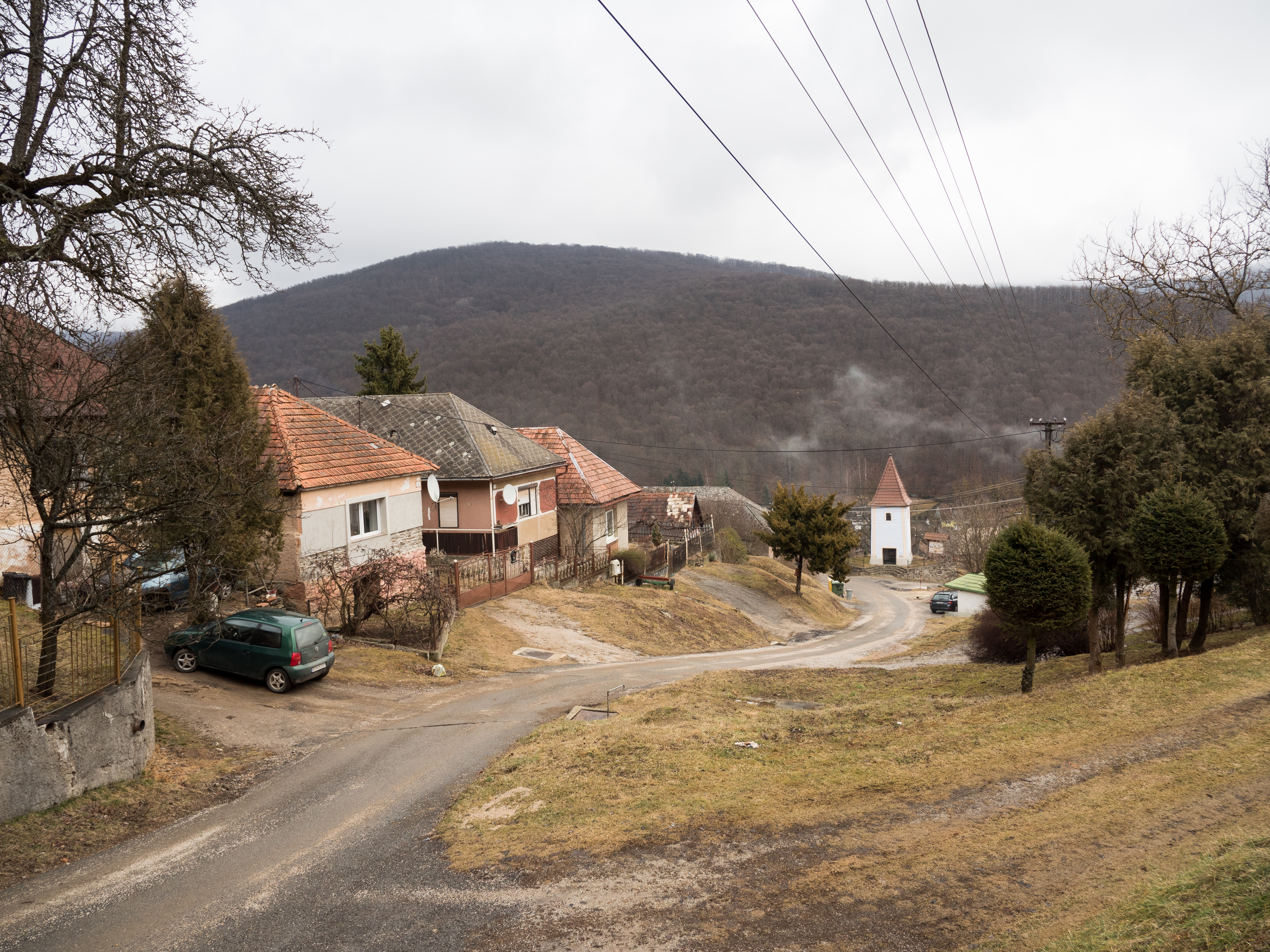

- Flag

- Location of Čučma in the Košice Region Location of Čučma in Slovakia
- Coordinates: 48.68°N 20.55°E
- Country: Slovakia
- Region: Košice Region
- District: Rožňava District
- First mentioned: 1300

Area
  - Total: 11.69 km^{2} (4.51 sq mi)
- Elevation: 447 m (1,467 ft)

Population (2025)
  - Total: 575
- Time zone: UTC+1 (CET)
  - Summer (DST): UTC+2 (CEST)
- Postal code: 480 1
- Area code: +421 58
- Vehicle registration plate (until 2022): RV
- Website: www.obeccucma.sk

Čučma (Hungarian: Csucsom) is a village and municipality in the Rožňava District in the Košice Region of eastern Slovakia.

== History ==
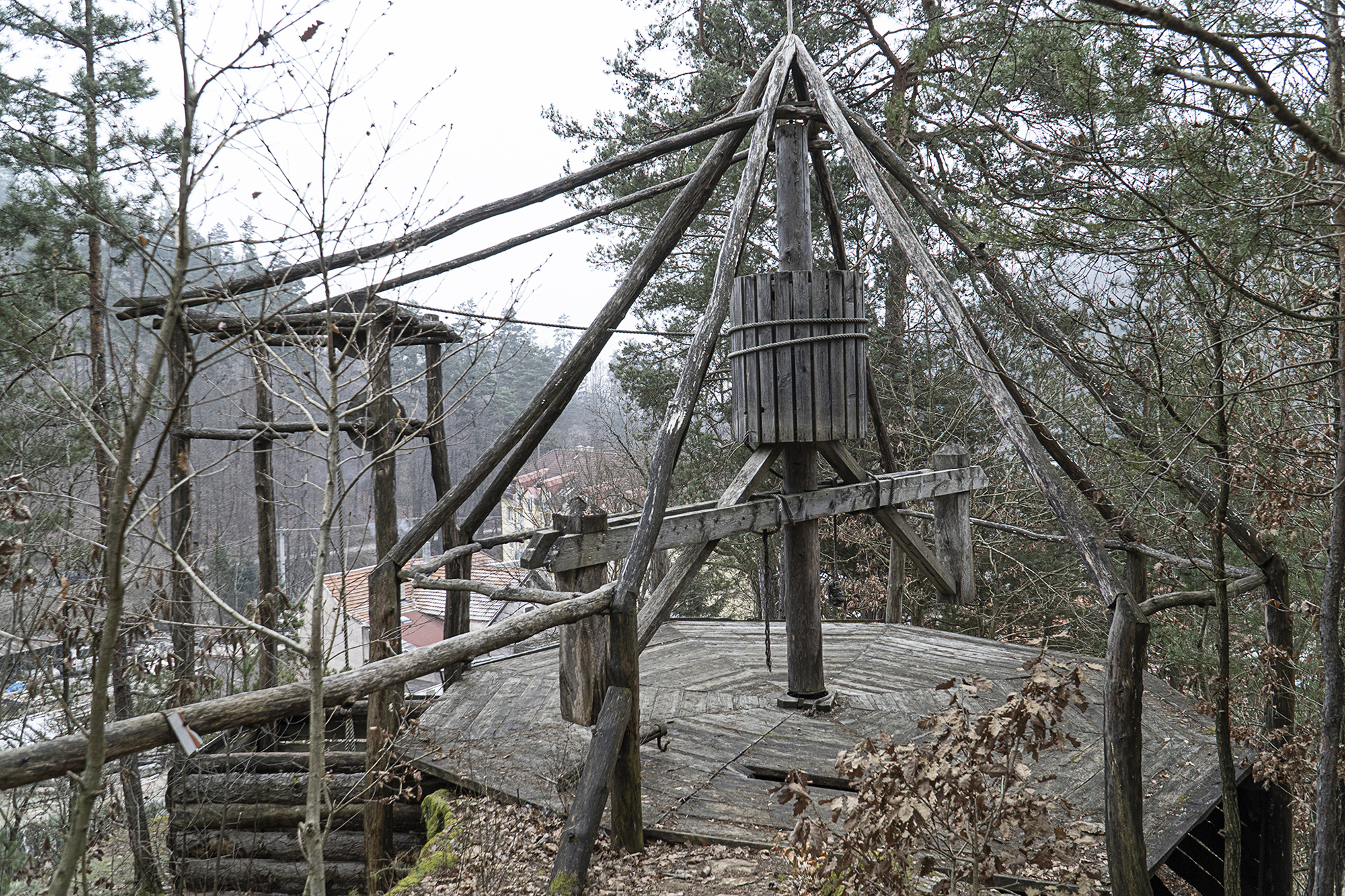
Replica of medieval mining device

In historical records the village was first mentioned in 1300. Before the establishment of independent Czechoslovakia in 1918, Čučma was part of Gömör and Kishont County within the Kingdom of Hungary. From 1938 to 1945, it was again part of Hungary as a result of the First Vienna Award.

The village has long mining traditions. There were several mines in the village where iron ore was extracted. The village has several historical monuments:

- Baroque-classicist bell tower from the 18th century
- Educational trail dedicated to the local mining history. It includes an old mining tunnel and a replica of a medieval mining device, which was built according to the medieval painting Rožňavská metercia.
- Maurer's Villa, a secessionist villa that belonged to the polyhistor Arthur Maurer.

== Geography ==
The municipality lies at an altitude of 447 metres (1,467 ft) and covers an area of 11.69 km^{2} (4.51 sq mi) (2025).

== Population ==
Population statistic (10 years)
Year	1995	2005	2015	2025
Count	498	644	653	575
Difference		+29.31%	+1.39%	−11.94%

Population statistic
Year	2024	2025
Count	588	575
Difference		−2.21%

It has a population of 575 people (31 December 2025).

=== Ethnicity ===
Census 2021 (1+%)
Ethnicity	Number	Fraction
Slovak	374	64.93%
Hungarian	214	37.15%
Not found out	35	6.07%
Total	576	

In year 2021 was 576 people by ethnicity 374 as Slovak, 214 as Hungarian, 35 as Not found out, 5 as Czech, 3 as Romani and 1 as Other.

Note on population: The difference values of population numbers in the table "Population statistic" and in the sections "Ethnicity" & "Religion" is caused by the use of various statistical methods.

=== Religion ===
Census 2021 (1+%)
Religion	Number	Fraction
None	315	54.69%
Roman Catholic Church	103	17.88%
Evangelical Church	68	11.81%
Calvinist Church	35	6.08%
Not found out	34	5.9%
Greek Catholic Church	8	1.39%
Total	576	

In year 2021 was 576 people by religion 315 from None, 103 from Roman Catholic Church, 68 from Evangelical Church, 35 from Calvinist Church, 34 from Not found out, 8 from Greek Catholic Church, 4 from Jehovah's Witnesses, 4 from Baptists Church, 1 from Other and not ascertained christian church, 1 from Christian Congregations in Slovakia, 1 from Other, 1 from United Methodist Church and 1 from Ad hoc movements.

== Genealogical resources ==
The records for genealogical research are available at the state archive "Statny Archiv in Kosice, Slovakia".

- Roman Catholic church records (births/marriages/deaths): 1672–1898 (parish B)
- Lutheran church records (births/marriages/deaths): 1632–1925 (parish B)

== See also ==
- List of municipalities and towns in Slovakia
