= Silická Jablonica =

Village and municipality in Slovakia

Silická Jablonica Jablonca
- Municipality
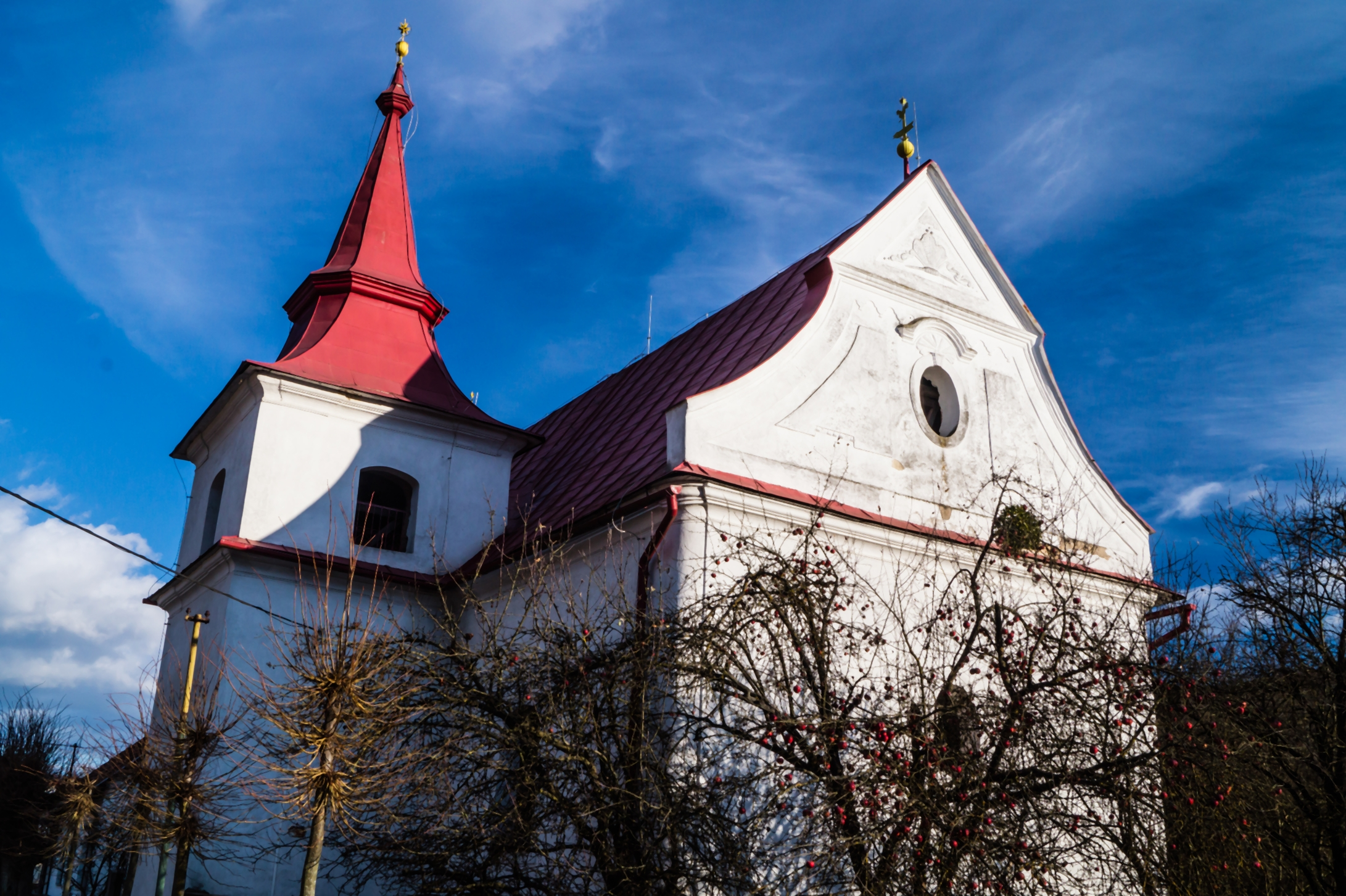

- Flag

- Location of Silická Jablonica in the Košice Region Location of Silická Jablonica in Slovakia
- Coordinates: 48.57°N 20.62°E
- Country: Slovakia
- Region: Košice Region
- District: Rožňava District
- First mentioned: 1386

Area
  - Total: 25.56 km^{2} (9.87 sq mi)
- Elevation: 246 m (807 ft)

Population (2025)
  - Total: 176
- Time zone: UTC+1 (CET)
  - Summer (DST): UTC+2 (CEST)
- Postal code: 494 3
- Area code: +421 58
- Vehicle registration plate (until 2022): RV

Silická Jablonica (Hungarian: Jablonca) is a village and municipality in the Rožňava District in the Košice Region of middle-eastern Slovakia.

== History ==
In historical records the village was first mentioned in 1386. Before the establishment of independent Czechoslovakia in 1918, Silická Jablonica was part of Abaúj-Torna County within the Kingdom of Hungary. From 1938 to 1945, it was again part of Hungary as a result of the First Vienna Award.

== Geography ==
The municipality lies at an altitude of 246 metres (807 ft) and covers an area of 25.56 km^{2} (9.87 sq mi) (2025).

== Population ==
Population statistic (10 years)
Year	1995	2005	2015	2025
Count	271	225	191	176
Difference		−16.97%	−15.11%	−7.85%

Population statistic
Year	2024	2025
Count	172	176
Difference		+2.32%

It has a population of 176 people (31 December 2025).

=== Ethnicity ===
Census 2021 (1+ %)
Ethnicity	Number	Fraction
Hungarian	168	92.3%
Slovak	16	8.79%
Not found out	3	1.64%
Total	182	

In year 2021 was 182 people by ethnicity 168 as Hungarian, 16 as Slovak and 3 as Not found out.

Note on population: The difference values of population numbers in the table "Population statistic" and in the sections "Ethnicity" & "Religion" is caused by the use of various statistical methods.

=== Religion ===
Census 2021 (1+ %)
Religion	Number	Fraction
Calvinist Church	132	72.53%
None	22	12.09%
Roman Catholic Church	21	11.54%
Other and not ascertained christian church	4	2.2%
Total	182	

In year 2021 was 182 people by religion 132 from Calvinist Church, 22 from None, 21 from Roman Catholic Church, 4 from Other and not ascertained christian church, 1 from Old Catholic Church, 1 from Greek Catholic Church and 1 from Evangelical Church.

== Culture ==
The village has a public library.
