= Gemerská Panica =

Village and municipality in Slovakia

Gemerská Panica Gömörpanyit
- Municipality
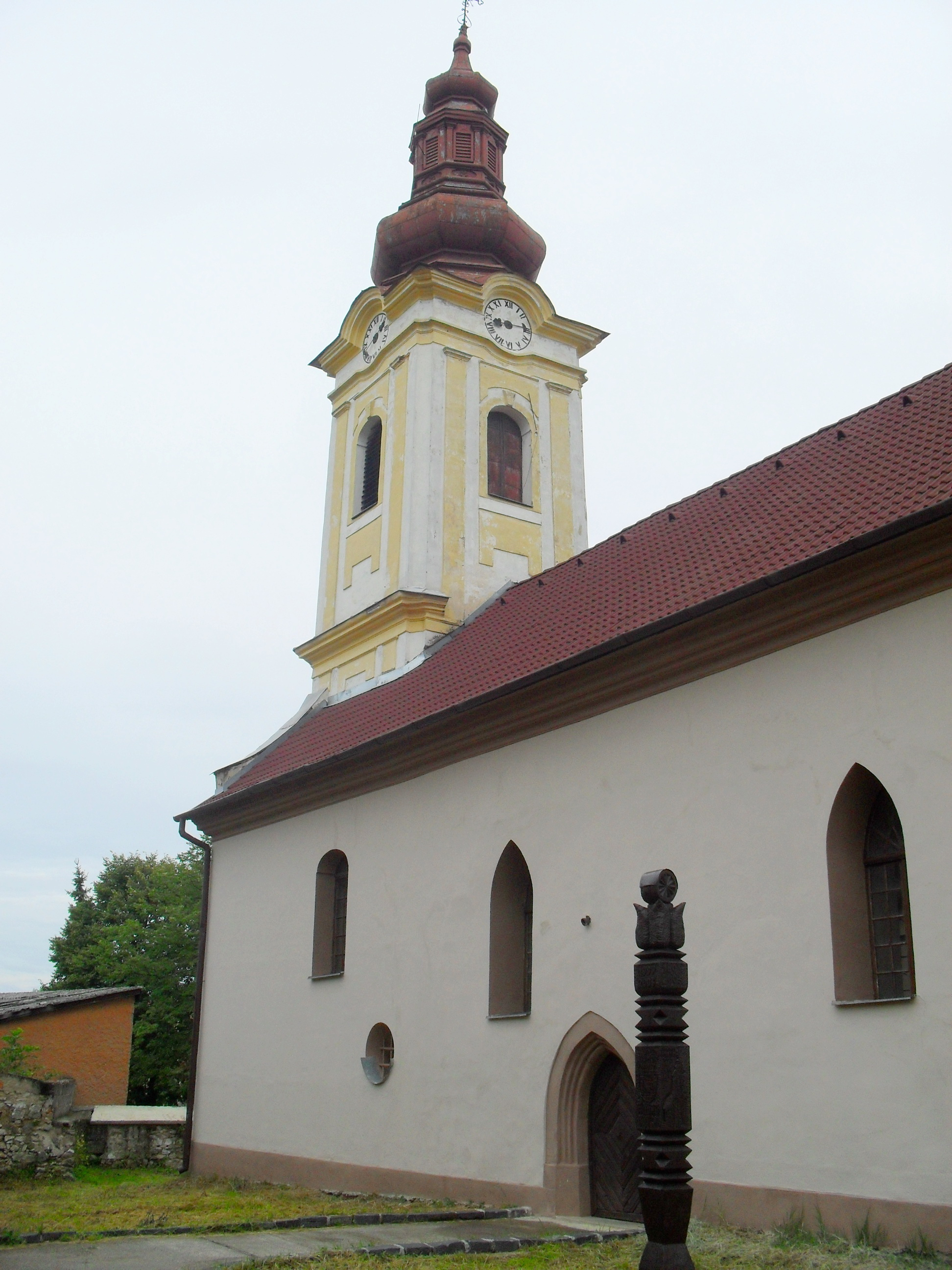

- Flag

- Location of Gemerská Panica in the Košice Region Location of Gemerská Panica in Slovakia
- Coordinates: 48.47°N 20.35°E
- Country: Slovakia
- Region: Košice Region
- District: Rožňava District
- First mentioned: 1247

Area
  - Total: 14.91 km^{2} (5.76 sq mi)
- Elevation: 191 m (627 ft)

Population (2025)
  - Total: 566
- Time zone: UTC+1 (CET)
  - Summer (DST): UTC+2 (CEST)
- Postal code: 980 46
- Area code: +421 47
- Vehicle registration plate (until 2022): RV
- Website: www.gemerskapanica.sk

Gemerská Panica (Hungarian: Gömörpanyit) is a village and municipality in the Rožňava District in the Košice Region of middle-eastern Slovakia.

== History ==
Before the establishment of independent Czechoslovakia in 1918, Gemerská Panica was part of Gömör and Kishont County within the Kingdom of Hungary. From 1938 to 1944, it was again part of Hungary as a result of the First Vienna Award.

== Geography ==
The municipality lies at an altitude of 191 metres (627 ft) and covers an area of 14.91 km^{2} (5.76 sq mi) (2025).

== Population ==
Population statistic (10 years)
Year	1995	2005	2015	2025
Count	726	711	643	566
Difference		−2.06%	−9.56%	−11.97%

Population statistic
Year	2024	2025
Count	568	566
Difference		−0.35%

It has a population of 566 people (31 December 2025).

=== Ethnicity ===
Census 2021 (1+ %)
Ethnicity	Number	Fraction
Slovak	344	58.2%
Hungarian	253	42.8%
Not found out	25	4.23%
Total	591	

In year 2021 was 591 people by ethnicity 344 as Slovak, 253 as Hungarian, 25 as Not found out, 4 as Czech, 1 as Ukrainian, 1 as Italian and 1 as French.

Note on population: The difference values of population numbers in the table "Population statistic" and in the sections "Ethnicity" & "Religion" is caused by the use of various statistical methods.

=== Religion ===
Census 2021 (1+ %)
Religion	Number	Fraction
None	246	41.62%
Roman Catholic Church	171	28.93%
Evangelical Church	74	12.52%
Calvinist Church	59	9.98%
Not found out	19	3.21%
Jehovah's Witnesses	11	1.86%
Total	591	

In year 2021 was 591 people by religion 246 from None, 171 from Roman Catholic Church, 74 from Evangelical Church, 59 from Calvinist Church, 19 from Not found out, 11 from Jehovah's Witnesses, 4 from Greek Catholic Church, 4 from United Methodist Church, 1 from Other, 1 from Buddhism and 1 from Ad hoc movements.

== Culture ==
The village has a public library and a football pitch.

== Genealogical resources ==
The records for genealogical research are available at the state archive "Statny Archiv in Banska Bystrica, Slovakia"

- Roman Catholic church records (births/marriages/deaths): 1852-1896 (parish B)
- Lutheran church records (births/marriages/deaths): 1805-1908 (parish A)
- Reformated church records (births/marriages/deaths): 1792-1904 (parish B)

== See also ==
- List of municipalities and towns in Slovakia
