= Kružná =

Village and municipality in Slovakia

Kružná Berzétekőrös
- Municipality
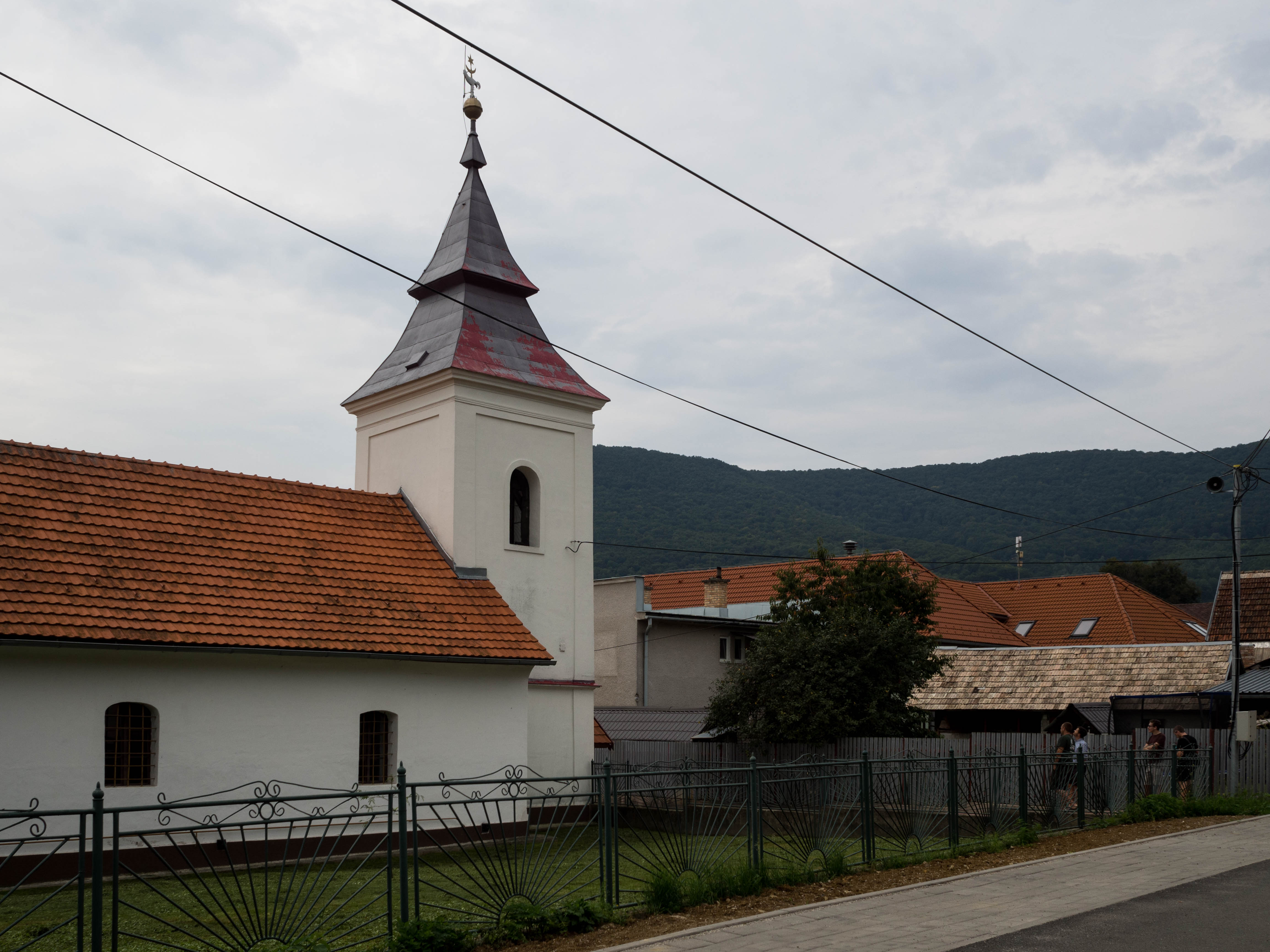

- Flag

- Location of Kružná in the Košice Region Location of Kružná in Slovakia
- Coordinates: 48.63°N 20.47°E
- Country: Slovakia
- Region: Košice Region
- District: Rožňava District
- First mentioned: 1327

Area
  - Total: 6.90 km^{2} (2.66 sq mi)
- Elevation: 308 m (1,010 ft)

Population (2025)
  - Total: 440
- Time zone: UTC+1 (CET)
  - Summer (DST): UTC+2 (CEST)
- Postal code: 495 1
- Area code: +421 58
- Vehicle registration plate (until 2022): RV
- Website: www.kruzna.sk

Kružná (Hungarian: Berzétekőrös) is a village and municipality in the Rožňava District in the Košice Region of middle-eastern Slovakia.

== History ==
In historical records the village was first mentioned in 1327. Before the establishment of independent Czechoslovakia in 1918, Kružná was part of Gömör and Kishont County within the Kingdom of Hungary. From 1938 to 1945, it was again part of Hungary as a result of the First Vienna Award.

== Geography ==
The municipality lies at an altitude of 308 metres (1,010 ft) and covers an area of 6.90 km^{2} (2.66 sq mi) (2025).

== Population ==
Population statistic (10 years)
Year	1995	2005	2015	2025
Count	537	515	489	440
Difference		−4.09%	−5.04%	−10.02%

Population statistic
Year	2024	2025
Count	445	440
Difference		−1.12%

It has a population of 440 people (31 December 2025).

=== Ethnicity ===
Census 2021 (1+ %)
Ethnicity	Number	Fraction
Hungarian	366	78.03%
Slovak	130	27.71%
Not found out	9	1.91%
Total	469	

In year 2021 was 469 people by ethnicity 366 as Hungarian, 130 as Slovak, 9 as Not found out, 2 as Ukrainian, 1 as Other and 1 as Albanian.

Note on population: The difference values of population numbers in the table "Population statistic" and in the sections "Ethnicity" & "Religion" is caused by the use of various statistical methods.

=== Religion ===
Census 2021 (1+ %)
Religion	Number	Fraction
Calvinist Church	201	42.86%
Roman Catholic Church	113	24.09%
None	96	20.47%
Evangelical Church	32	6.82%
Not found out	11	2.35%
Total	469	

In year 2021 was 469 people by religion 201 from Calvinist Church, 113 from Roman Catholic Church, 96 from None, 32 from Evangelical Church, 11 from Not found out, 4 from Jehovah's Witnesses, 3 from Other and not ascertained christian church, 3 from Greek Catholic Church, 2 from Eastern Orthodox Church, 2 from United Methodist Church, 1 from Paganism and natural spirituality and 1 from Ad hoc movements.

== Culture ==
The village has a public library and a football pitch.
