= Roštár =

Village and municipality in Slovakia

Roštár Restér
- Municipality
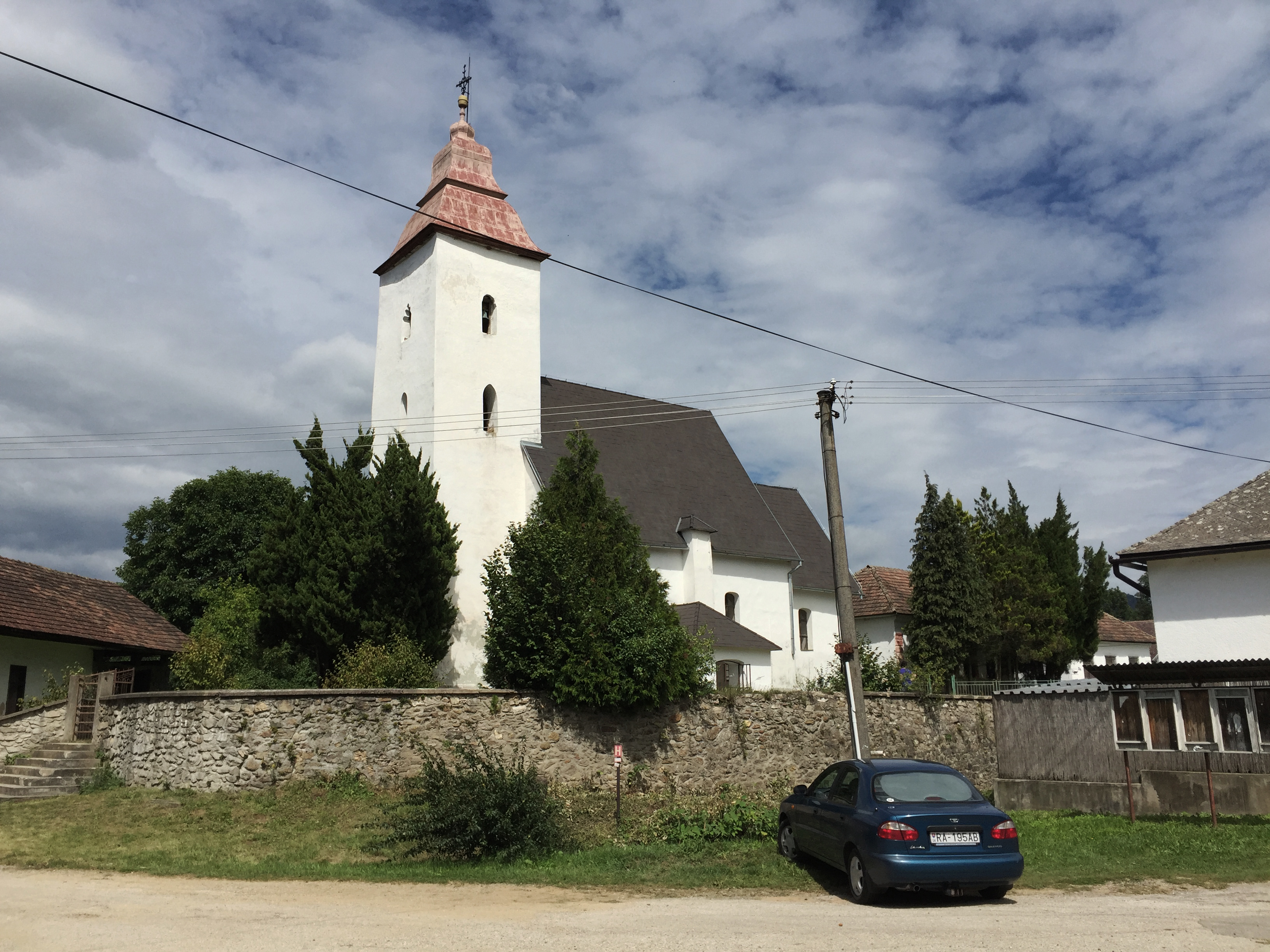

- Flag

- Location of Roštár in the Košice Region Location of Roštár in Slovakia
- Coordinates: 48.70°N 20.35°E
- Country: Slovakia
- Region: Košice Region
- District: Rožňava District
- First mentioned: 1318

Area
  - Total: 8.54 km^{2} (3.30 sq mi)
- Elevation: 318 m (1,043 ft)

Population (2025)
  - Total: 717
- Time zone: UTC+1 (CET)
  - Summer (DST): UTC+2 (CEST)
- Postal code: 493 5
- Area code: +421 58
- Vehicle registration plate (until 2022): RV
- Website: www.obecrostar.sk

Roštár (Hungarian: Restér) is a village and municipality in the Rožňava District in the Košice Region of middle-eastern Slovakia.

== History ==
In historical records the village was first mentioned in 1318. Before the establishment of independent Czechoslovakia in 1918, Roštár was part of Gömör and Kishont County within the Kingdom of Hungary. From 1939 to 1945, it was part of the Slovak Republic.

== Geography ==
The municipality lies at an altitude of 318 metres (1,043 ft) and covers an area of 8.54 km^{2} (3.30 sq mi) (2025).

== Population ==
Population statistic (10 years)
Year	1995	2005	2015	2025
Count	500	539	607	717
Difference		+7.8%	+12.61%	+18.12%

Population statistic
Year	2024	2025
Count	701	717
Difference		+2.28%

It has a population of 717 people (31 December 2025).

=== Ethnicity ===
Census 2021 (1+ %)
Ethnicity	Number	Fraction
Slovak	596	94%
Romani	96	15.14%
Not found out	25	3.94%
Hungarian	7	1.1%
Total	634	

In year 2021 was 634 people by ethnicity 596 as Slovak, 96 as Romani, 25 as Not found out, 7 as Hungarian, 3 as Other, 2 as Czech and 1 as English.

Note on population: The difference values of population numbers in the table "Population statistic" and in the sections "Ethnicity" & "Religion" is caused by the use of various statistical methods.

=== Religion ===
Census 2021 (1+ %)
Religion	Number	Fraction
None	430	67.82%
Evangelical Church	174	27.44%
Not found out	17	2.68%
Roman Catholic Church	9	1.42%
Total	634	

In year 2021 was 634 people by religion 430 from None, 174 from Evangelical Church, 17 from Not found out, 9 from Roman Catholic Church, 1 from Other and not ascertained christian church, 1 from Islam, 1 from Greek Catholic Church and 1 from United Methodist Church.

On 31 December 2011, it had a population of 551 people.

The majority of the municipality's population consists of the members of the local Roma community. In 2019, they constituted an estimated 75% of the population.

== Culture ==
The village has a public library and a gymnasium
