= Rakovnica =

Rakovnica Rekenyeújfalu
- Municipality
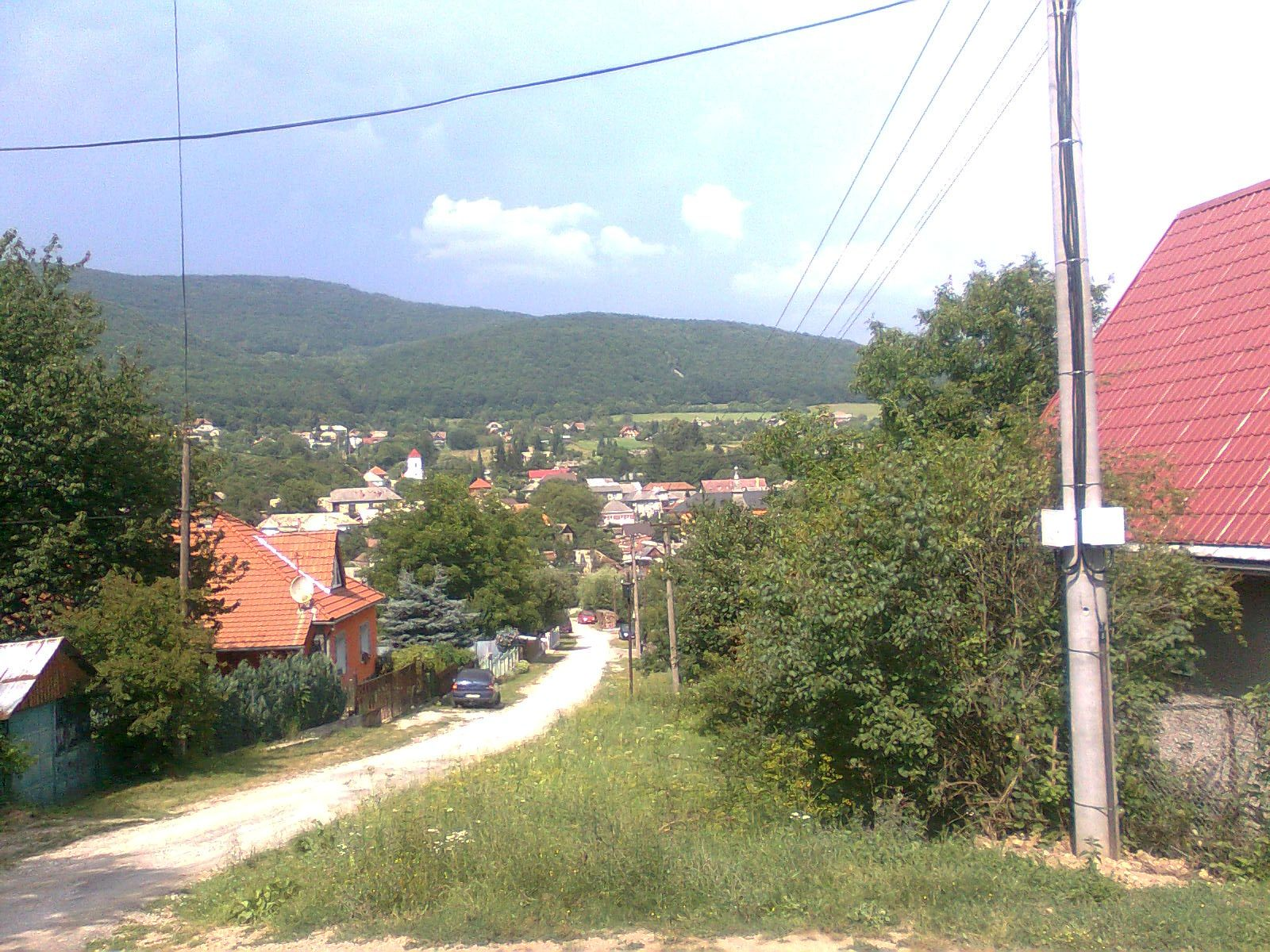

- Flag

- Location of Rakovnica in the Košice Region Location of Rakovnica in Slovakia
- Coordinates: 48.67°N 20.47°E
- Country: Slovakia
- Region: Košice Region
- District: Rožňava District
- First mentioned: 1327

Area
  - Total: 7.10 km^{2} (2.74 sq mi)
- Elevation: 345 m (1,132 ft)

Population (2025)
  - Total: 587
- Time zone: UTC+1 (CET)
  - Summer (DST): UTC+2 (CEST)
- Postal code: 493 1
- Area code: +421 58
- Vehicle registration plate (until 2022): RV
- Website: rakovnica.sk

Rakovnica (Hungarian: Rekenyeújfalu) is a village and municipality in the Rožňava District in the Košice Region of middle-eastern Slovakia.

== History ==
In historical records the village was first mentioned in 1327. Before the establishment of independent Czechoslovakia in 1918, Rakovnica was part of Gömör and Kishont County within the Kingdom of Hungary. From 1938 to 1945, it was again part of Hungary as a result of the First Vienna Award.

== Geography ==
The municipality lies at an altitude of 345 metres (1,132 ft) and covers an area of 7.10 km^{2} (2.74 sq mi) (2025).

== Population ==
Population statistic (10 years)
Year	1995	2005	2015	2025
Count	594	580	588	587
Difference		−2.35%	+1.37%	−0.17%

Population statistic
Year	2024	2025
Count	570	587
Difference		+2.98%

It has a population of 587 people (31 December 2025).

=== Ethnicity ===
Census 2021 (1+ %)
Ethnicity	Number	Fraction
Slovak	570	95.31%
Hungarian	21	3.51%
Czech	6	1%
Not found out	6	1%
Total	598	

In year 2021 was 598 people by ethnicity 570 as Slovak, 21 as Hungarian, 6 as Czech, 6 as Not found out, 5 as Canadian, 3 as English and 2 as Other.

Note on population: The difference values of population numbers in the table "Population statistic" and in the sections "Ethnicity" & "Religion" is caused by the use of various statistical methods.

=== Religion ===
Census 2021 (1+ %)
Religion	Number	Fraction
None	338	56.52%
Evangelical Church	135	22.58%
Roman Catholic Church	95	15.89%
Calvinist Church	8	1.34%
Not found out	7	1.17%
Total	598	

In year 2021 was 598 people by religion 338 from None, 135 from Evangelical Church, 95 from Roman Catholic Church, 8 from Calvinist Church, 7 from Not found out, 4 from Greek Catholic Church, 4 from Ad hoc movements, 2 from Jehovah's Witnesses, 2 from United Methodist Church, 1 from Eastern Orthodox Church, 1 from Christian Congregations in Slovakia and 1 from Other.

== Culture ==
The village has a public library and a football pitch.
