= Jablonov nad Turňou =

Village and municipality in Slovakia

Jablonov nad Turňou Szádalmás
- Municipality
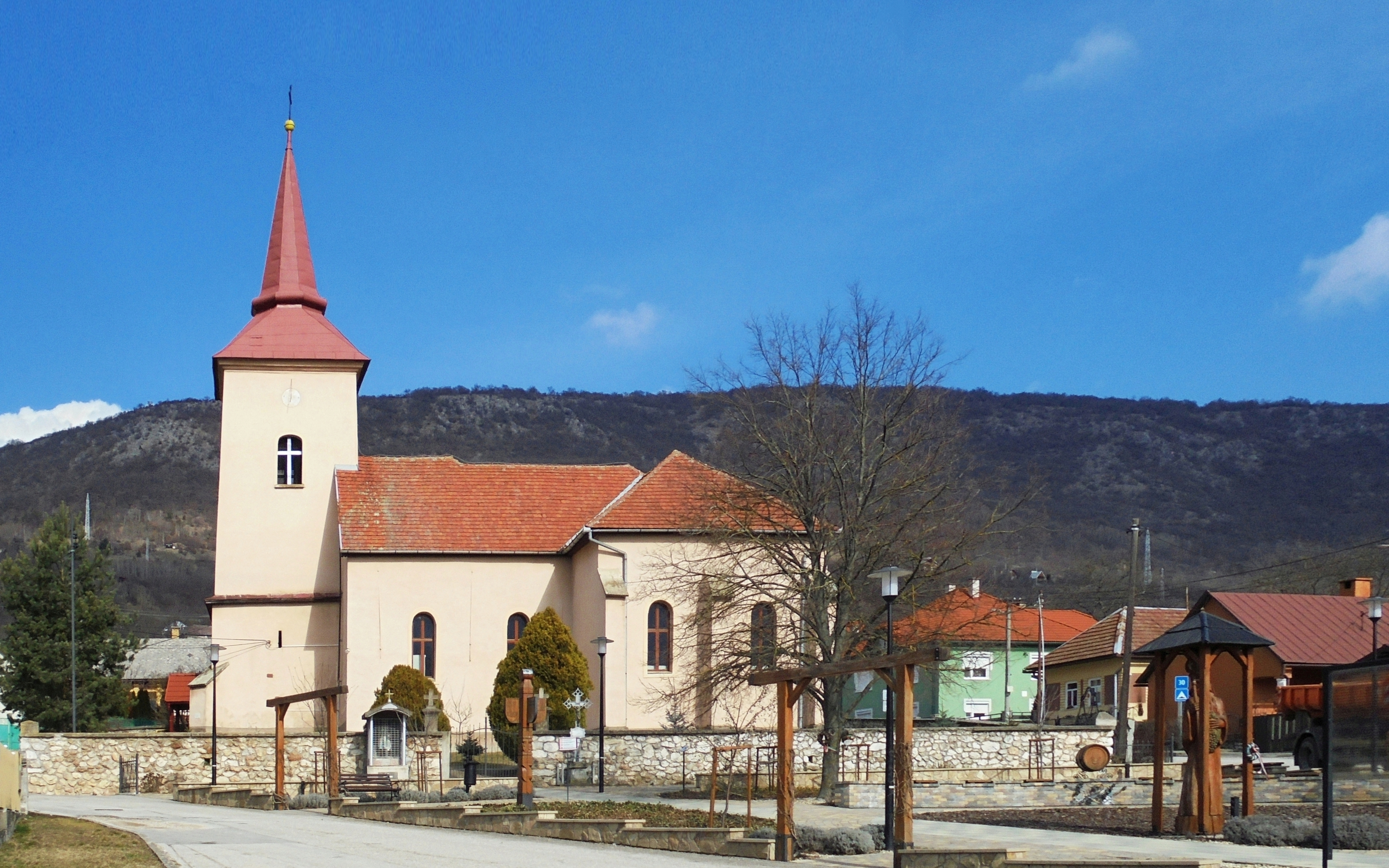
- Church of the Holy Trinity

- Flag

- Location of Jablonov nad Turňou in the Košice Region Location of Jablonov nad Turňou in Slovakia
- Coordinates: 48.59°N 20.67°E
- Country: Slovakia
- Region: Košice Region
- District: Rožňava District
- First mentioned: 1235

Area
  - Total: 24.46 km^{2} (9.44 sq mi)
- Elevation: 227 m (745 ft)

Population (2025)
  - Total: 729
- Time zone: UTC+1 (CET)
  - Summer (DST): UTC+2 (CEST)
- Postal code: 494 3
- Area code: +421 58
- Vehicle registration plate (until 2022): RV
- Website: www.jablonovnt.sk

Jablonov nad Turňou (Hungarian: Szádalmás) is a village and municipality in the Rožňava District in the Košice Region of middle-eastern Slovakia.

== History ==
In historical records the village was first mentioned in 1235. Before the establishment of independent Czechoslovakia in 1918, Jablonov nad Turňou was part of Abaúj-Torna County within the Kingdom of Hungary. From 1938 to 1945, it was again part of Hungary as a result of the First Vienna Award.

== Geography ==
The municipality lies at an altitude of 227 metres (745 ft) and covers an area of 24.46 km^{2} (9.44 sq mi) (2025).

== Population ==
Population statistic (10 years)
Year	1995	2005	2015	2025
Count	868	846	774	729
Difference		−2.53%	−8.51%	−5.81%

Population statistic
Year	2024	2025
Count	733	729
Difference		−0.54%

It has a population of 729 people (31 December 2025).

=== Ethnicity ===
Census 2021 (1+ %)
Ethnicity	Number	Fraction
Hungarian	609	80.98%
Slovak	174	23.13%
Not found out	14	1.86%
Total	752	

In year 2021 was 752 people by ethnicity 609 as Hungarian, 174 as Slovak, 14 as Not found out, 2 as Czech, 2 as Polish, 2 as Other and 1 as Jewish.

Note on population: The difference values of population numbers in the table "Population statistic" and in the sections "Ethnicity" & "Religion" is caused by the use of various statistical methods.

=== Religion ===
Census 2021 (1+ %)
Religion	Number	Fraction
Calvinist Church	302	40.16%
Roman Catholic Church	294	39.1%
None	106	14.1%
Evangelical Church	15	1.99%
Greek Catholic Church	11	1.46%
Not found out	9	1.2%
Total	752	

In year 2021 was 752 people by religion 302 from Calvinist Church, 294 from Roman Catholic Church, 106 from None, 15 from Evangelical Church, 11 from Greek Catholic Church, 9 from Not found out, 4 from United Methodist Church, 3 from Islam, 3 from Apostolic Church, 2 from Eastern Orthodox Church, 1 from Jewish community, 1 from Other and 1 from Ad hoc movements.

== Facilities ==
The village has a pharmacy and a doctors surgery. It also has a public library and a football pitch.

== Genealogical resources ==
The records for genealogical research are available at the state archive "Statny Archiv in Kosice, Slovakia"

- Roman Catholic church records (births/marriages/deaths): 1889-1895 (parish A)
- Reformed church records (births/marriages/deaths): 1783-1830 (parish B)

== See also ==
- List of municipalities and towns in Slovakia
