= Kečovo =

Village and municipality in Slovakia

Kečovo Kecső
- Municipality
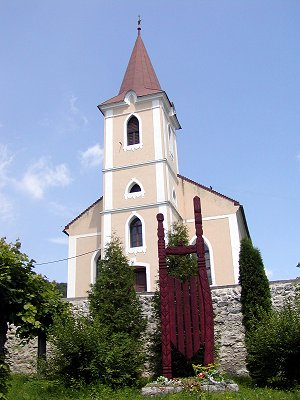

- Flag

- Location of Kečovo in the Košice Region Location of Kečovo in Slovakia
- Coordinates: 48.50°N 20.48°E
- Country: Slovakia
- Region: Košice Region
- District: Rožňava District
- First mentioned: 1272

Area
  - Total: 13.57 km^{2} (5.24 sq mi)
- Elevation: 332 m (1,089 ft)

Population (2025)
  - Total: 302
- Time zone: UTC+1 (CET)
  - Summer (DST): UTC+2 (CEST)
- Postal code: 495 5
- Area code: +421 58
- Vehicle registration plate (until 2022): RV
- Website: www.kecovo.sk

Kečovo (Hungarian: Kecső, German: Götsche) is a village and municipality in the Rožňava District in the Košice Region of middle-eastern Slovakia.

== History ==
In historical records the village was first mentioned in 1272. Before the establishment of independent Czechoslovakia in 1918, Kečovo was part of Gömör and Kishont County within the Kingdom of Hungary. From 1938 to 1944, it was again part of Hungary as a result of the First Vienna Award.

== Geography ==
The municipality lies at an altitude of 332 metres (1,089 ft) and covers an area of 13.57 km^{2} (5.24 sq mi) (2025).

== Population ==
Population statistic (10 years)
Year	1995	2005	2015	2025
Count	464	383	358	302
Difference		−17.45%	−6.52%	−15.64%

Population statistic
Year	2024	2025
Count	306	302
Difference		−1.30%

It has a population of 302 people (31 December 2025).

=== Ethnicity ===
Census 2021 (1+ %)
Ethnicity	Number	Fraction
Hungarian	285	87.96%
Slovak	47	14.5%
Not found out	21	6.48%
Total	324	

In year 2021 was 324 people by ethnicity 285 as Hungarian, 47 as Slovak, 21 as Not found out, 2 as Ukrainian and 1 as Other.

Note on population: The difference values of population numbers in the table "Population statistic" and in the sections "Ethnicity" & "Religion" is caused by the use of various statistical methods.

=== Religion ===
Census 2021 (1+ %)
Religion	Number	Fraction
Roman Catholic Church	145	44.75%
Evangelical Church	70	21.6%
None	63	19.44%
Calvinist Church	21	6.48%
Not found out	11	3.4%
Greek Catholic Church	4	1.23%
United Methodist Church	4	1.23%
Total	324	

In year 2021 was 324 people by religion 145 from Roman Catholic Church, 70 from Evangelical Church, 63 from None, 21 from Calvinist Church, 11 from Not found out, 4 from Greek Catholic Church, 4 from United Methodist Church, 3 from Other and not ascertained christian church and 3 from Jehovah's Witnesses.

== Culture ==
The village has a public library and a football pitch.

== Genealogical resources ==
The records for genealogical research are available at the state archive "Statny Archiv in Banska Bystrica, Kosice, Slovakia"

- Roman Catholic church records (births/marriages/deaths): 1852-1896 (parish B)
- Reformed church records (births/marriages/deaths): 1888-1895 (parish B)

== See also ==
- List of municipalities and towns in Slovakia
