= Rožňava District =

Coordinates: 48°39′46″N 20°32′2″E

- District
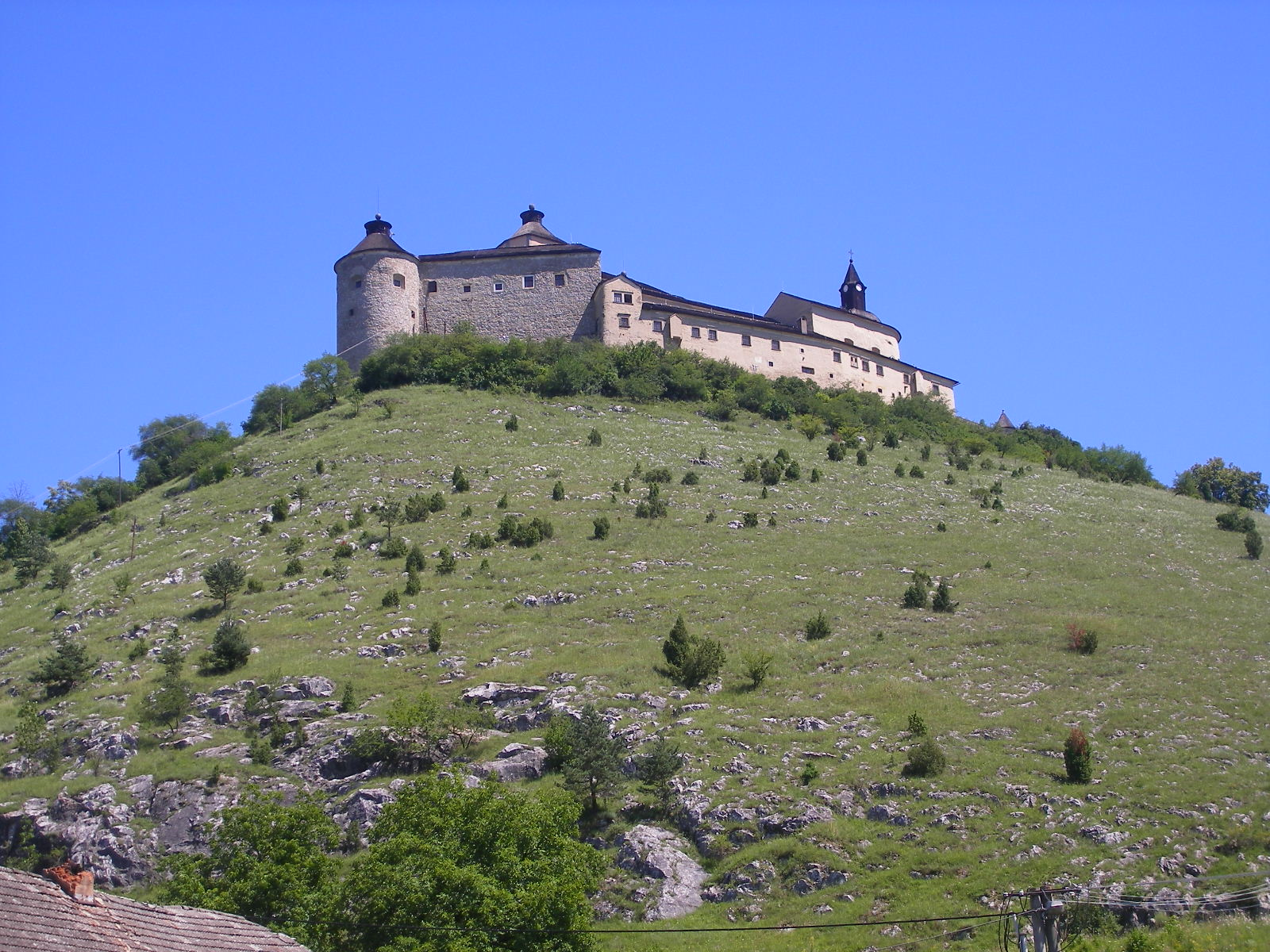
- Country: Slovakia
- Region (kraj): Košice Region
- Seat: Rožňava

Area
  - Total: 1,173.33 km^{2} (453.03 sq mi)

Population (2025)
  - Total: 58,189
- Time zone: UTC+1 (CET)
  - Summer (DST): UTC+2 (CEST)
- Telephone prefix: 058
- Vehicle registration plate (until 2022): RV
- Municipalities: 62

Rožňava District (Slovak: okres Rožňava) is a district in the Košice Region of eastern Slovakia. Until 1918, the district was mostly part of the county of Kingdom of Hungary of Gömör és Kishont, apart from the area in the south-east around the municipalities of Silická Jablonica, Hrušov, Jablonov nad Turňou and Hrhov which formed part of the county of Abaúj-Torna.

== Population ==
Population statistic (10 years)
Year	1995	2005	2015	2025
Count	61,274	62,038	62,699	58,189
Difference		+1.24%	+1.06%	−7.19%

Population statistic
Year	2024	2025
Count	58,305	58,189
Difference		−0.19%

It has a population of 58,189 people (31 December 2025).

Historical population
Year	Pop.	±%
1970	59,474	—
1980	60,581	+1.9%
1991	60,681	+0.2%
2001	61,887	+2.0%
2011	63,351	+2.4%
2021	59,345	−6.3%
Source: Statistical Office of the Slovak Republic

=== Ethnicity ===
Census 2021 (1+ %)
Ethnicity	Number	Fraction
Slovak	40,837	62.89%
Hungarian	15,064	23.2%
Romani	4155	6.39%
Not found out	4032	6.21%
Total	64,928	

In year 2021 was 64,928 people by ethnicity 40,837 as Slovak, 15,064 as Hungarian, 4155 as Romani, 4032 as Not found out, 294 as Czech, 118 as Other, 110 as Rusyn, 65 as German, 53 as Ukrainian, 34 as Russian, 25 as Polish, 20 as Italian, 19 as Vietnamese, 18 as English, 13 as Jewish, 11 as Chinese, 8 as Irish, 8 as Canadian, 6 as Turkish, 6 as Romanian, 6 as Austrian, 6 as Greek, 5 as Serbian, 5 as Moravian, 3 as French, 3 as Bulgarian, 3 as Albanian and 1 as Croatian.

Note on population: The difference values of population numbers in the table "Population statistic" and in the sections "Ethnicity" & "Religion" is caused by the use of various statistical methods.

=== Religion ===
Census 2021 (1+ %)
Religion	Number	Fraction
None	24,244	40.85%
Roman Catholic Church	14,491	24.42%
Evangelical Church	10,056	16.94%
Calvinist Church	4225	7.12%
Not found out	4004	6.75%
Greek Catholic Church	749	1.26%
Total	59,345	

In year 2021 was 59,345 people by religion 24,244 from None, 14,491 from Roman Catholic Church, 10,056 from Evangelical Church, 4225 from Calvinist Church, 4004 from Not found out, 749 from Greek Catholic Church, 509 from Jehovah's Witnesses, 205 from Apostolic Church, 183 from United Methodist Church, 114 from Ad hoc movements, 98 from Christian Congregations in Slovakia, 96 from Other, 85 from Other and not ascertained christian church, 80 from Eastern Orthodox Church, 50 from Buddhism, 43 from Old Catholic Church, 29 from Seventh-day Adventist Church, 25 from Paganism and natural spirituality, 24 from Islam, 11 from Jewish community, 10 from Hinduism, 8 from Baptists Church, 3 from Church of the Brethren, 2 from Czechoslovak Hussite Church and 1 from New Apostolic Church.

== Municipalities ==
Municipality	Area [km^{2}]	Population
Ardovo	11.20	140
Betliar	24.66	907
Bohúňovo	6.80	257
Bôrka	23.73	678
Brdárka	6.13	59
Bretka	9.54	402
Brzotín	18.97	1,372
Čierna Lehota	31.86	573
Čoltovo	15.38	461
Čučma	11.69	575
Dedinky	3.64	224
Dlhá Ves	10.76	534
Dobšiná	82.72	5,158
Drnava	26.89	691
Gemerská Hôrka	12.79	1,251
Gemerská Panica	14.91	566
Gemerská Poloma	57.63	1,893
Gočaltovo	10.67	208
Gočovo	14.65	291
Hanková	10.87	81
Henckovce	10.03	382
Honce	8.08	324
Hrhov	36.07	1,034
Hrušov	16.78	323
Jablonov nad Turňou	24.46	729
Jovice	10.07	825
Kečovo	13.57	302
Kobeliarovo	12.02	512
Koceľovce	6.95	222
Kováčová	13.81	57
Krásnohorská Dlhá Lúka	14.03	696
Krásnohorské Podhradie	23.17	2,861
Kružná	6.90	440
Kunova Teplica	8.41	708
Lipovník	12.72	508
Lúčka	14.93	183
Markuška	6.80	154
Meliata	14.49	171
Nižná Slaná	18.88	1,227
Ochtiná	14.48	529
Pača	25.57	522
Pašková	6.00	328
Petrovo	3.96	96
Plešivec	62.14	2,138
Rakovnica	7.10	587
Rejdová	50.51	722
Rochovce	8.33	362
Roštár	8.54	717
Rozložná	12.58	206
Rožňava	47.22	16,794
Rožňavské Bystré	7.93	538
Rudná	7.50	693
Silica	34.56	517
Silická Brezová	13.36	127
Silická Jablonica	25.56	176
Slavec	17.52	466
Slavoška	4.37	140
Slavošovce	15.53	1,797
Stratená	35.36	118
Štítnik	34.54	1,468
Vlachovo	37.33	756
Vyšná Slaná	15.35	413

Population and area values are current for year 2025.
