= Hrhov =

Hrhov Tornagörgő
- Municipality
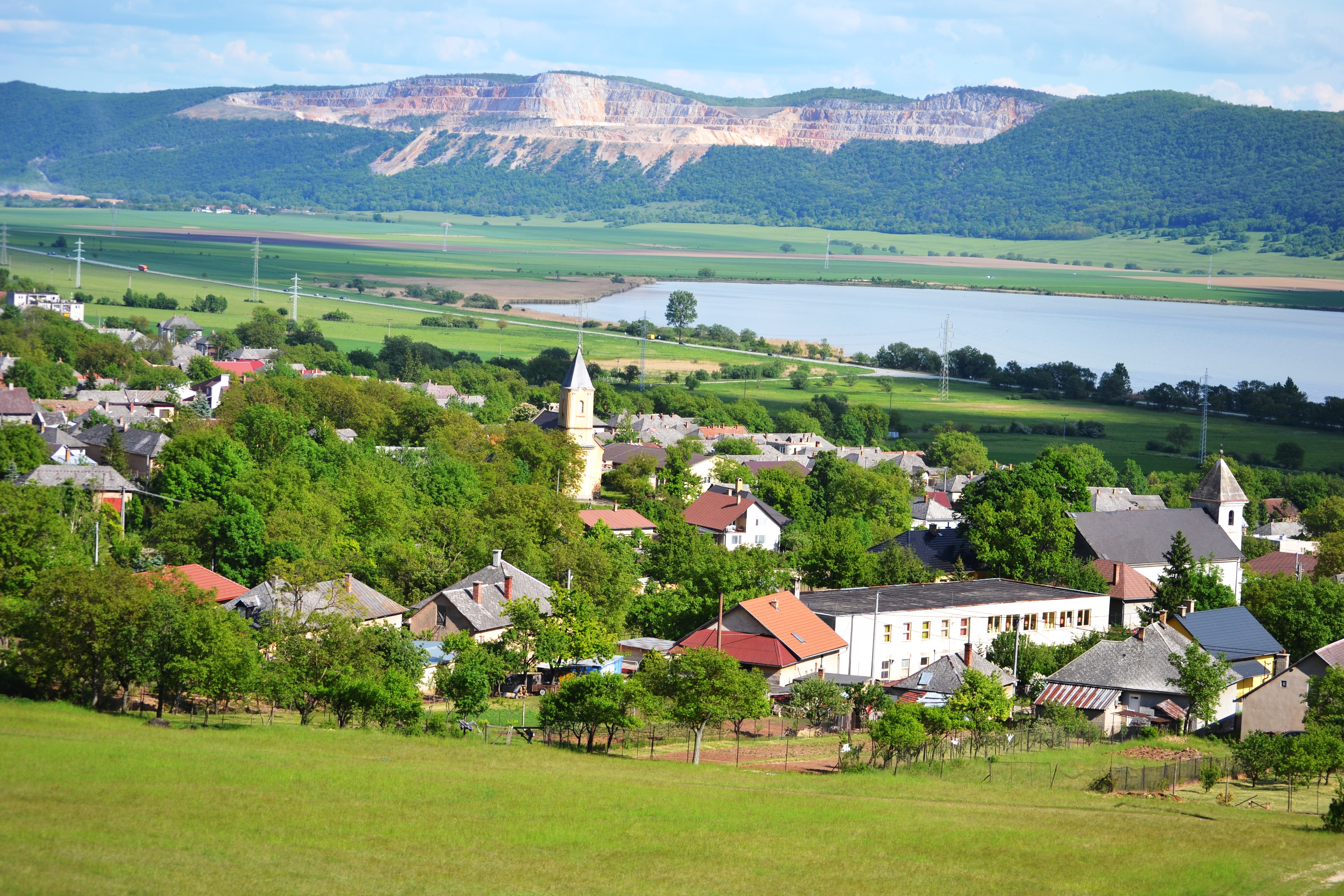

- Flag Coat of arms

- Location of Hrhov in the Košice Region Location of Hrhov in Slovakia
- Coordinates: 48.61°N 20.75°E
- Country: Slovakia
- Region: Košice Region
- District: Rožňava District
- First mentioned: 1263

Government
  - Mayor: Ladislav Tankó

Area
  - Total: 36.07 km^{2} (13.93 sq mi)
- Elevation: 216 m (709 ft)

Population (2025)
  - Total: 1,034
- Time zone: UTC+1 (CET)
  - Summer (DST): UTC+2 (CEST)
- Postal code: 494 4
- Area code: +421 58
- Vehicle registration plate (until 2022): RV
- Website: www.hrhov.sk

Hrhov (Hungarian: Tornagörgő) is a village and large municipality in the Rožňava District in the Košice Region of middle-eastern Slovakia.

== History ==
In historical records the village was first mentioned in 1263. Before the establishment of independent Czechoslovakia in 1918, Hrhov was part of Abaúj-Torna County within the Kingdom of Hungary. From 1938 to 1945, it was again part of Hungary as a result of the First Vienna Award.

== Geography ==
The municipality lies at an altitude of 216 metres (709 ft) and covers an area of 36.07 km^{2} (13.93 sq mi) (2025).

== Population ==
Population statistic (10 years)
Year	1995	2005	2015	2025
Count	1172	1181	1102	1034
Difference		+0.76%	−6.68%	−6.17%

Population statistic
Year	2024	2025
Count	1040	1034
Difference		−0.57%

It has a population of 1034 people (31 December 2025).

=== Ethnicity ===
Census 2021 (1+ %)
Ethnicity	Number	Fraction
Hungarian	856	83.92%
Slovak	216	21.17%
Not found out	36	3.52%
Total	1020	

In year 2021 was 1020 people by ethnicity 856 as Hungarian, 216 as Slovak, 36 as Not found out, 6 as Romani, 2 as Czech, 2 as Romanian, 2 as German and 1 as Other.

Note on population: The difference values of population numbers in the table "Population statistic" and in the sections "Ethnicity" & "Religion" is caused by the use of various statistical methods.

=== Religion ===
Census 2021 (1+ %)
Religion	Number	Fraction
Roman Catholic Church	446	43.73%
Calvinist Church	407	39.9%
None	89	8.73%
Evangelical Church	37	3.63%
Not found out	21	2.06%
Total	1020	

In year 2021 was 1020 people by religion 446 from Roman Catholic Church, 407 from Calvinist Church, 89 from None, 37 from Evangelical Church, 21 from Not found out, 10 from Greek Catholic Church, 4 from Jehovah's Witnesses, 3 from Old Catholic Church, 1 from Other and not ascertained christian church, 1 from Other and 1 from Baptists Church.

== Culture ==
The village has a public library, a gymnasium and a football pitch.

== Genealogical resources ==
The records for genealogical research are available at the state archive "Statny Archiv in Kosice, Slovakia"

- Roman Catholic church records (births/marriages/deaths): 1697-1899 (parish A)

== Nature ==
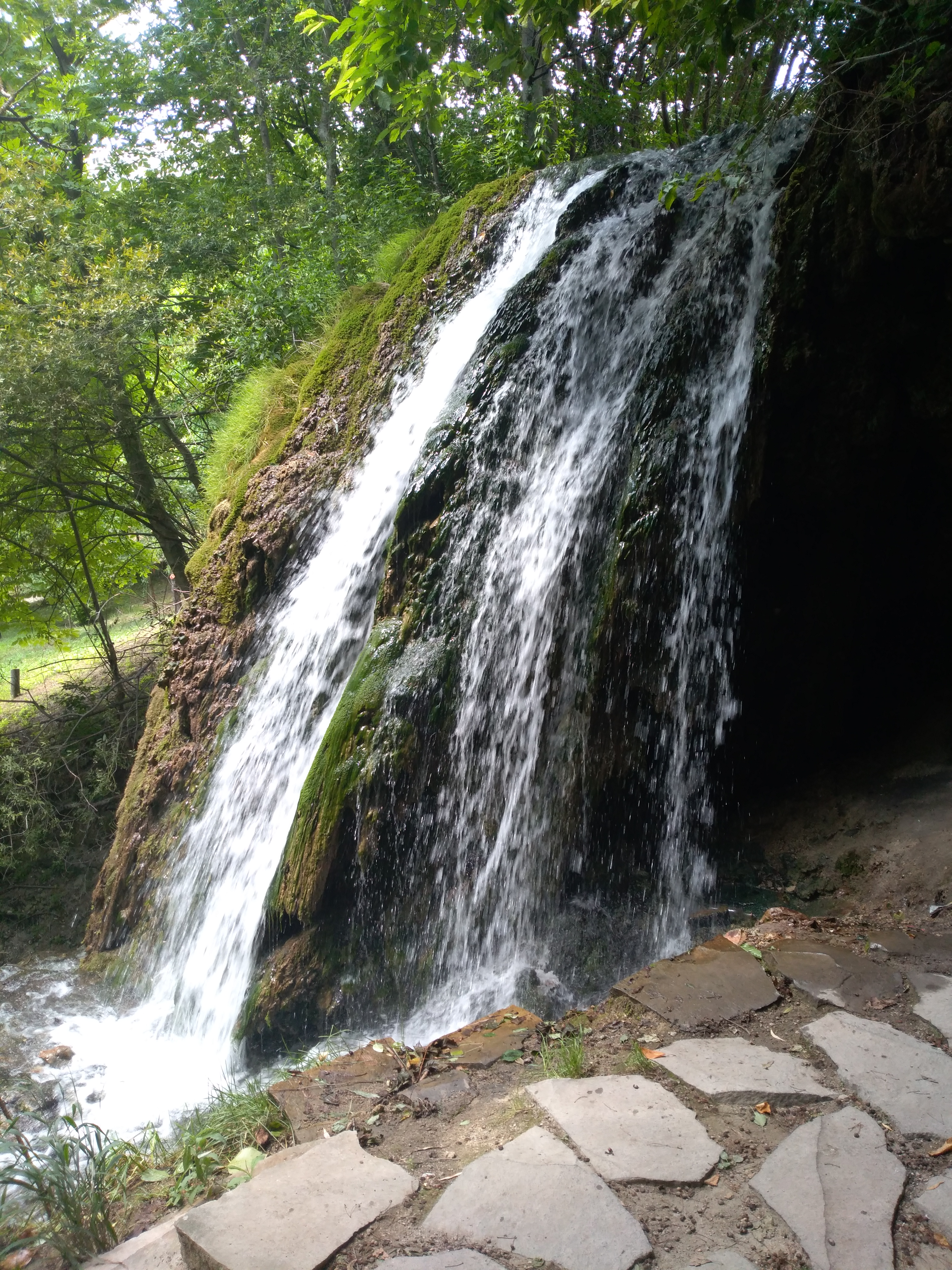
Hrhov Waterfall

In the village there is Hrhov Waterfall, which is the largest in the Slovak Karst. It is located directly in the village between the residential houses.

== See also ==
- List of municipalities and towns in Slovakia
