= Gemerská Hôrka =

Village and municipality in Slovakia

Gemerská Hôrka Özörény
- Municipality
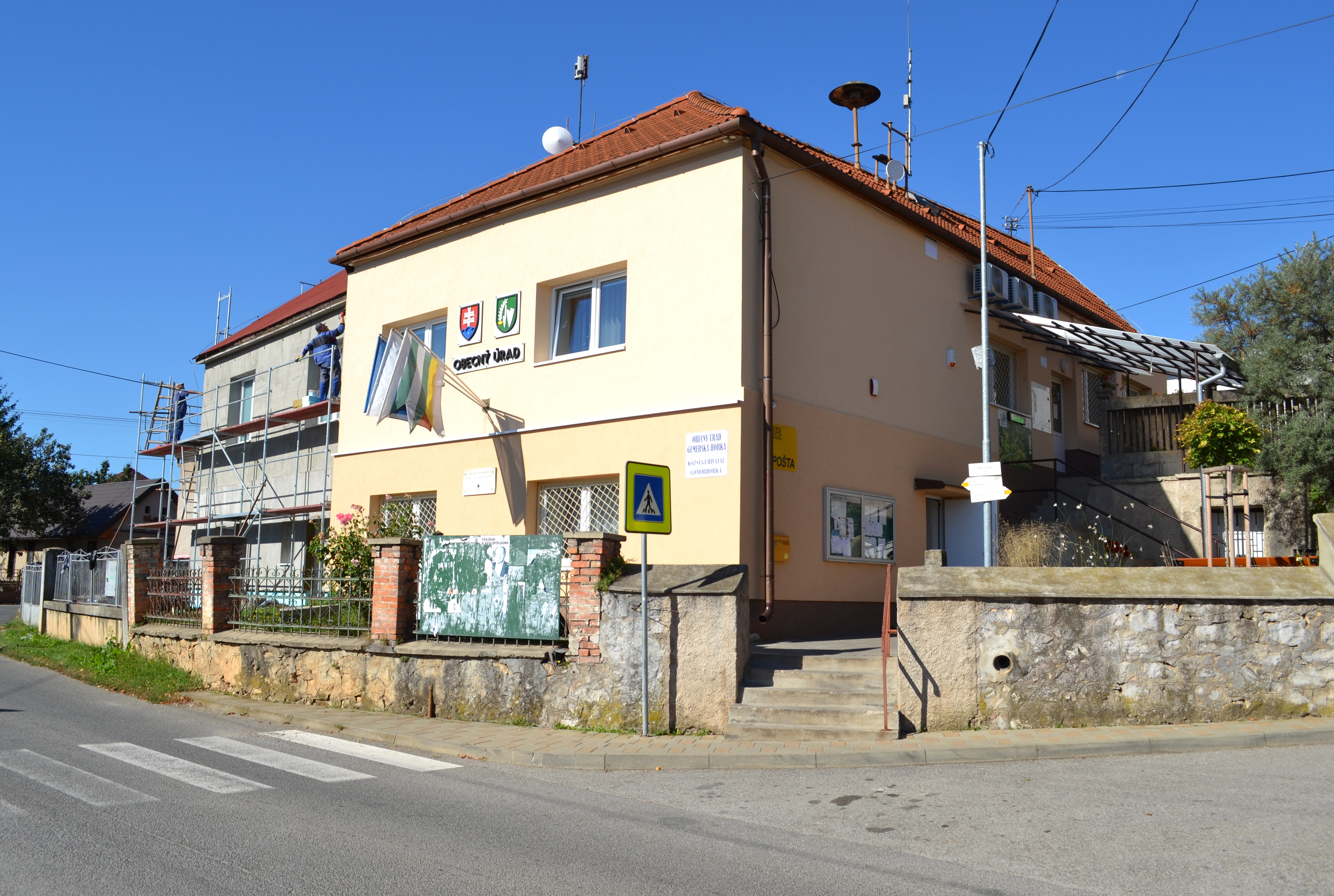

- Flag

- Location of Gemerská Hôrka in the Košice Region Location of Gemerská Hôrka in Slovakia
- Coordinates: 48.53°N 20.38°E
- Country: Slovakia
- Region: Košice Region
- District: Rožňava District
- First mentioned: 1413

Area
  - Total: 12.79 km^{2} (4.94 sq mi)
- Elevation: 219 m (719 ft)

Population (2025)
  - Total: 1,251
- Time zone: UTC+1 (CET)
  - Summer (DST): UTC+2 (CEST)
- Postal code: 491 2
- Area code: +421 58
- Vehicle registration plate (until 2022): RV
- Website: www.gemerskahorka.eu

Gemerská Hôrka (Hungarian: Özörény, Gömörhorka) is a village and municipality in the Rožňava District in the Košice Region of middle-eastern Slovakia.

== History ==
In historical records, the village was first mentioned in 1413. Before the establishment of independent Czechoslovakia in 1918, Gemerská Hôrka was part of Gömör and Kishont County within the Kingdom of Hungary. From 1938 to 1945, it was again part of Hungary as a result of the First Vienna Award.

== Geography ==
The municipality lies at an altitude of 219 metres (719 ft) and covers an area of 12.79 km^{2} (4.94 sq mi) (2025).

== Population ==
Population statistic (10 years)
Year	1995	2005	2015	2025
Count	1308	1342	1302	1251
Difference		+2.59%	−2.98%	−3.91%

Population statistic
Year	2024	2025
Count	1266	1251
Difference		−1.18%

It has a population of 1251 people (31 December 2025).

=== Ethnicity ===
Census 2021 (1+ %)
Ethnicity	Number	Fraction
Hungarian	733	56.9%
Slovak	540	41.92%
Romani	133	10.32%
Not found out	33	2.56%
Total	1288	

In year 2021 was 1288 people by ethnicity 733 as Hungarian, 540 as Slovak, 133 as Romani, 33 as Not found out, 7 as Czech, 2 as Russian, 1 as Rusyn, 1 as Polish and 1 as German.

Note on population: The difference values of population numbers in the table "Population statistic" and in the sections "Ethnicity" & "Religion" is caused by the use of various statistical methods.

=== Religion ===
Census 2021 (1+ %)
Religion	Number	Fraction
None	648	50.31%
Calvinist Church	296	22.98%
Roman Catholic Church	181	14.05%
Evangelical Church	73	5.67%
Not found out	46	3.57%
Greek Catholic Church	17	1.32%
Jehovah's Witnesses	16	1.24%
Total	1288	

In year 2021 was 1288 people by religion 648 from None, 296 from Calvinist Church, 181 from Roman Catholic Church, 73 from Evangelical Church, 46 from Not found out, 17 from Greek Catholic Church, 16 from Jehovah's Witnesses, 3 from Christian Congregations in Slovakia, 2 from United Methodist Church, 1 from Eastern Orthodox Church, 1 from Other and not ascertained christian church, 1 from Other, 1 from Seventh-day Adventist Church, 1 from Buddhism and 1 from Ad hoc movements.

== Amenities ==
The village has a football pitch.

== Genealogical resources ==
The records for genealogical research are available at the state archive "Statny Archiv in Banska Bystrica, Kosice, Slovakia"

- Roman Catholic Church records (births/marriages/deaths): 1825-1895 (parish B)
- Lutheran Church records (births/marriages/deaths): 1805-1908 (parish B)
- Reformed Church records (births/marriages/deaths): 1792-1916 (parish A)

== See also ==
- List of municipalities and towns in Slovakia
