= Stratená =

Stratená Sztracena
- Municipality
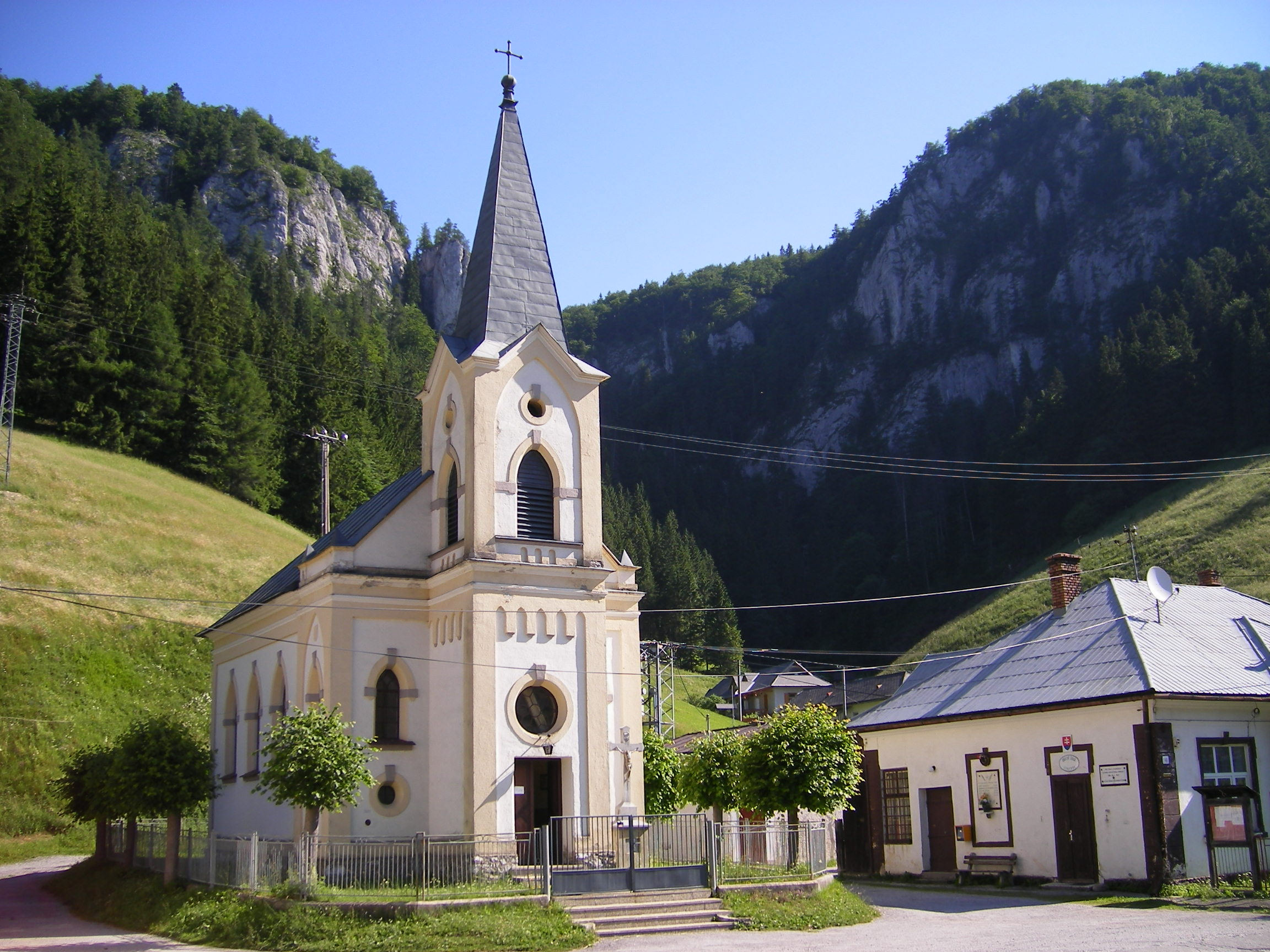
- Church of Saint Augustine

- Flag

- Location of Stratená in the Košice Region Location of Stratená in Slovakia
- Coordinates: 48.87°N 20.35°E
- Country: Slovakia
- Region: Košice Region
- District: Rožňava District
- First mentioned: 1723

Area
  - Total: 35.36 km^{2} (13.65 sq mi)
- Elevation: 831 m (2,726 ft)

Population (2025)
  - Total: 118
- Time zone: UTC+1 (CET)
  - Summer (DST): UTC+2 (CEST)
- Postal code: 497 2
- Area code: +421 58
- Vehicle registration plate (until 2022): RV
- Website: stratena.sk

Stratená (Hungarian: Sztracena) is a village and municipality in the Rožňava District in the Košice Region of middle-eastern Slovakia.

== History ==
In historical records the village was first mentioned in 1723, so it is one of the newest villages in Roznava District. Before the establishment of independent Czechoslovakia in 1918, Stratená was part of Szepes County within the Kingdom of Hungary. From 1939 to 1945, it was part of the Slovak Republic.

== Geography ==
The municipality lies at an altitude of 831 metres (2,726 ft) and covers an area of 35.36 km^{2} (13.65 sq mi) (2025).

== Population ==
Population statistic (10 years)
Year	1995	2005	2015	2025
Count	186	144	125	118
Difference		−22.58%	−13.19%	−5.6%

Population statistic
Year	2024	2025
Count	119	118
Difference		−0.84%

It has a population of 118 people (31 December 2025).

=== Ethnicity ===
Census 2021 (1+ %)
Ethnicity	Number	Fraction
Slovak	116	96.66%
Not found out	4	3.33%
Total	120	

In year 2021 was 120 people by ethnicity 116 as Slovak and 4 as Not found out.

Note on population: The difference values of population numbers in the table "Population statistic" and in the sections "Ethnicity" & "Religion" is caused by the use of various statistical methods.

=== Religion ===
Census 2021 (1+ %)
Religion	Number	Fraction
None	52	43.33%
Roman Catholic Church	48	40%
Evangelical Church	11	9.17%
Not found out	5	4.17%
Greek Catholic Church	2	1.67%
Total	120	

In year 2021 was 120 people by religion 52 from None, 48 from Roman Catholic Church, 11 from Evangelical Church, 5 from Not found out, 2 from Greek Catholic Church, 1 from Calvinist Church and 1 from Eastern Orthodox Church.
