= Vyšná Slaná =

Village and municipality in Slovakia

Vyšná Slaná Felsősajó
- Municipality
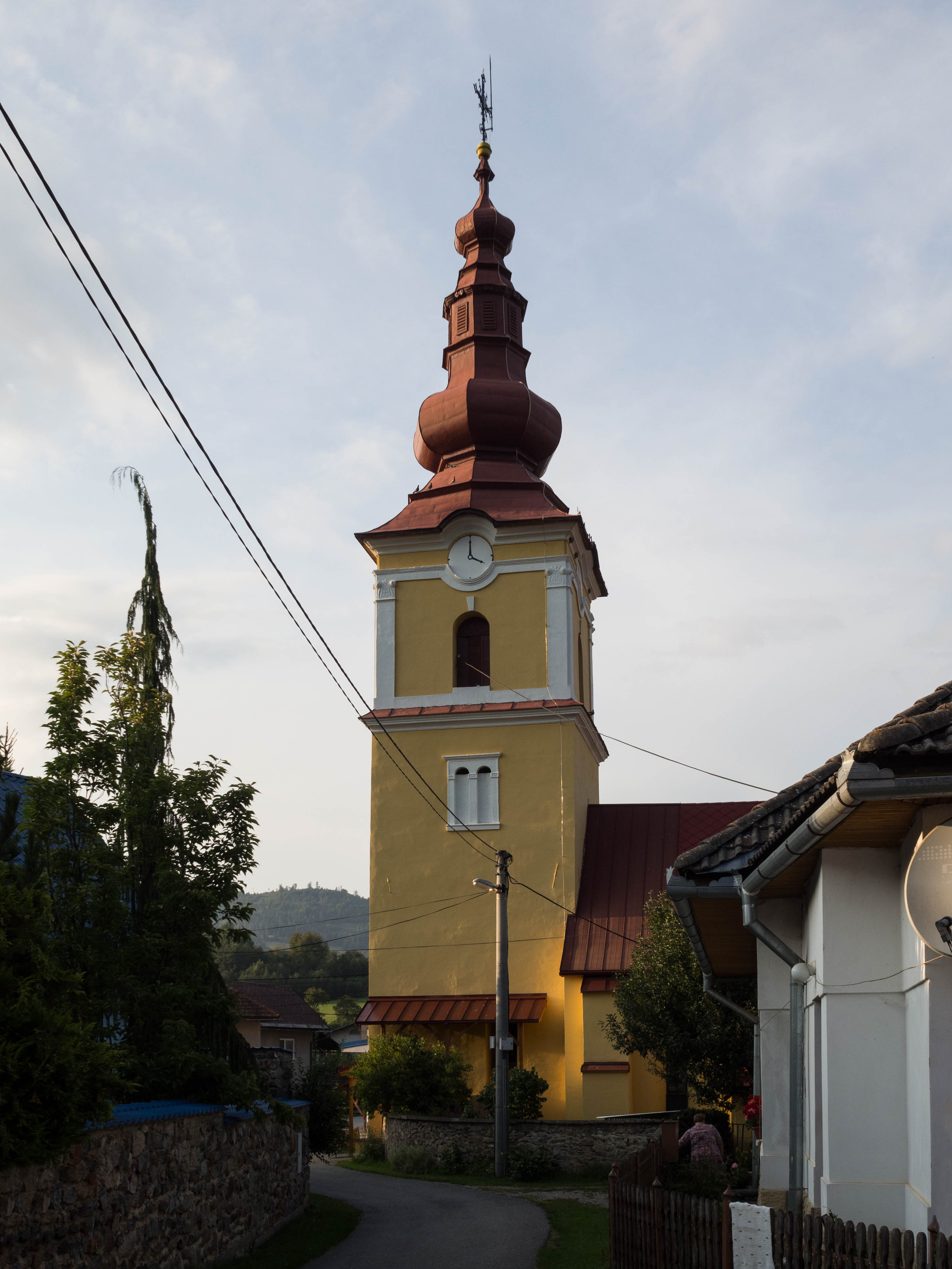

- Flag

- Location of Vyšná Slaná in the Košice Region Location of Vyšná Slaná in Slovakia
- Coordinates: 48.78°N 20.32°E
- Country: Slovakia
- Region: Košice Region
- District: Rožňava District
- First mentioned: 1326

Area
  - Total: 15.35 km^{2} (5.93 sq mi)
- Elevation: 482 m (1,581 ft)

Population (2025)
  - Total: 413
- Time zone: UTC+1 (CET)
  - Summer (DST): UTC+2 (CEST)
- Postal code: 492 6
- Area code: +421 58
- Vehicle registration plate (until 2022): RV
- Website: www.vysnaslana.sk

Vyšná Slaná (Hungarian: Felsősajó) is a village and municipality in the Rožňava District in the Košice Region of middle-eastern Slovakia.

== History ==
In historical records the village was first mentioned in 1362. Before the establishment of independent Czechoslovakia in 1918, Vyšná Slaná was part of Gömör and Kishont County within the Kingdom of Hungary. From 1939 to 1945, it was part of the Slovak Republic.

== Geography ==
The municipality lies at an altitude of 482 metres (1,581 ft) and covers an area of 15.35 km^{2} (5.93 sq mi) (2025).

== Population ==
Population statistic (10 years)
Year	1995	2005	2015	2025
Count	575	536	494	413
Difference		−6.78%	−7.83%	−16.39%

Population statistic
Year	2024	2025
Count	422	413
Difference		−2.13%

It has a population of 413 people (31 December 2025).

=== Ethnicity ===
Census 2021 (1+ %)
Ethnicity	Number	Fraction
Slovak	434	97.52%
Not found out	11	2.47%
Total	445	

In year 2021 was 445 people by ethnicity 434 as Slovak, 11 as Not found out, 2 as German, 1 as Czech, 1 as Romani and 1 as Hungarian.

Note on population: The difference values of population numbers in the table "Population statistic" and in the sections "Ethnicity" & "Religion" is caused by the use of various statistical methods.

=== Religion ===
Census 2021 (1+ %)
Religion	Number	Fraction
Evangelical Church	312	70.11%
None	91	20.45%
Roman Catholic Church	25	5.62%
Not found out	10	2.25%
Total	445	

In year 2021 was 445 people by religion 312 from Evangelical Church, 91 from None, 25 from Roman Catholic Church, 10 from Not found out, 4 from Greek Catholic Church, 1 from Calvinist Church, 1 from United Methodist Church and 1 from Ad hoc movements.

== Culture ==
The village has a public library, a gymnasium and a football pitch.
