= Rožňavské Bystré =

Village and municipality in Slovakia

Rožňavské Bystré Sebespatak
- Municipality
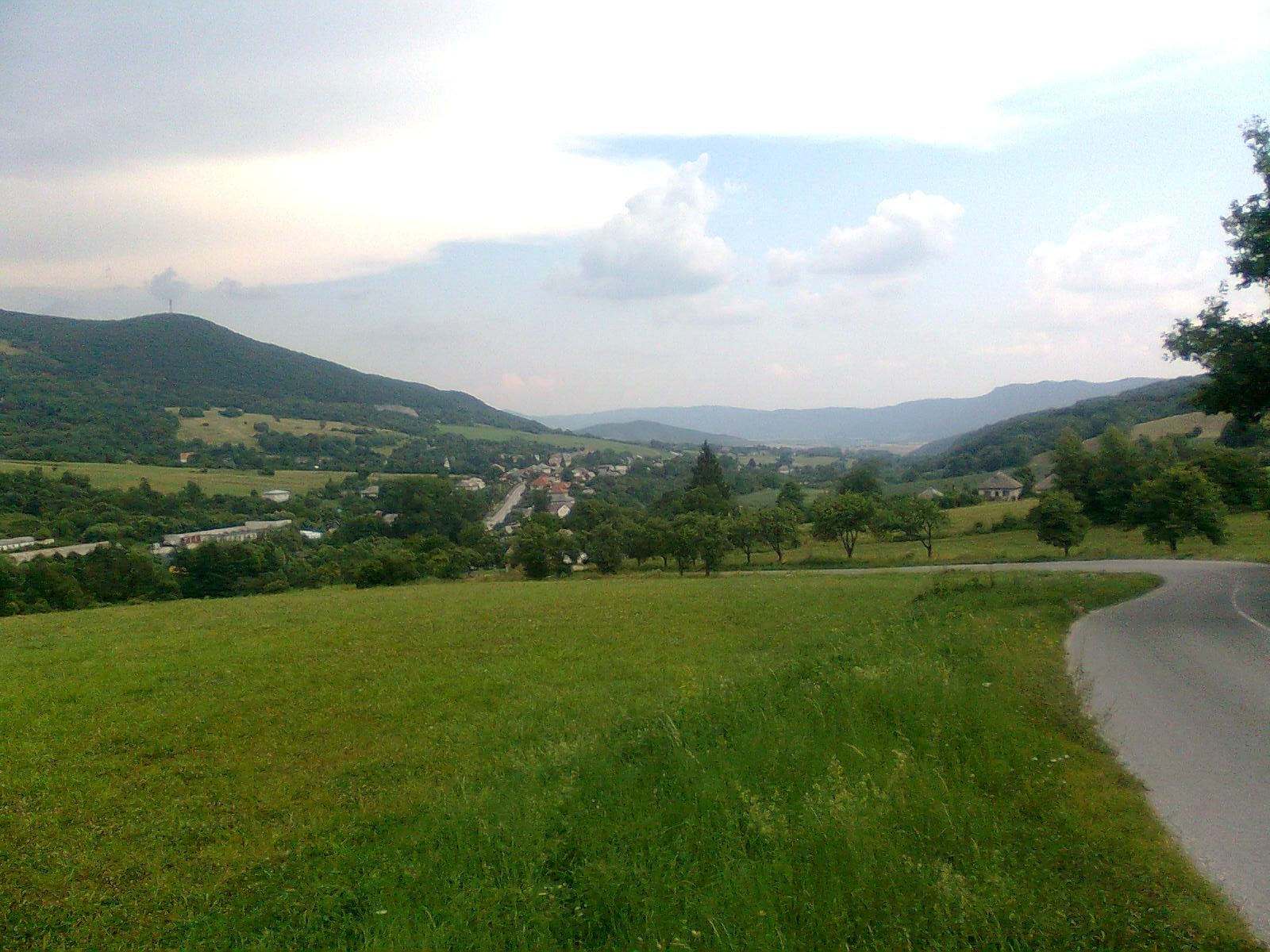

- Flag

- Location of Rožňavské Bystré in the Košice Region Location of Rožňavské Bystré in Slovakia
- Coordinates: 48.67°N 20.45°E
- Country: Slovakia
- Region: Košice Region
- District: Rožňava District
- First mentioned: 1318

Area
  - Total: 7.93 km^{2} (3.06 sq mi)
- Elevation: 391 m (1,283 ft)

Population (2025)
  - Total: 538
- Time zone: UTC+1 (CET)
  - Summer (DST): UTC+2 (CEST)
- Postal code: 493 1
- Area code: +421 58
- Vehicle registration plate (until 2022): RV
- Website: roznavskebystre.sk

Rožňavské Bystré (Slovak pronunciation: [ˈrɔʐɲawskeː ˈbistreː]; Hungarian: Sebespatak) is a village and municipality in the Rožňava District in the Košice Region of middle-eastern Slovakia.

== History ==
In historical records the village was first mentioned in 1318. Before the establishment of independent Czechoslovakia in 1918, Rožňavské Bystré was part of Gömör and Kishont County within the Kingdom of Hungary. From 1939 to 1945, it was part of the Slovak Republic.

== Geography ==
The municipality lies at an altitude of 391 metres (1,283 ft) and covers an area of 7.93 km^{2} (3.06 sq mi) (2025).

== Population ==
Population statistic (10 years)
Year	1995	2005	2015	2025
Count	545	591	626	538
Difference		+8.44%	+5.92%	−14.05%

Population statistic
Year	2024	2025
Count	551	538
Difference		−2.35%

It has a population of 538 people (31 December 2025).

=== Ethnicity ===
Census 2021 (1+ %)
Ethnicity	Number	Fraction
Slovak	585	97.98%
Hungarian	8	1.34%
Romani	6	1%
Total	597	

In year 2021 was 597 people by ethnicity 585 as Slovak, 8 as Hungarian, 6 as Romani, 4 as Not found out, 4 as Other, 2 as German, 1 as Czech, 1 as Ukrainian, 1 as Rusyn and 1 as Russian.

Note on population: The difference values of population numbers in the table "Population statistic" and in the sections "Ethnicity" & "Religion" is caused by the use of various statistical methods.

=== Religion ===
Census 2021 (1+ %)
Religion	Number	Fraction
None	297	49.75%
Evangelical Church	206	34.51%
Roman Catholic Church	65	10.89%
Greek Catholic Church	13	2.18%
Not found out	6	1.01%
Total	597	

In year 2021 was 597 people by religion 297 from None, 206 from Evangelical Church, 65 from Roman Catholic Church, 13 from Greek Catholic Church, 6 from Not found out, 3 from Eastern Orthodox Church, 2 from Paganism and natural spirituality, 2 from Buddhism, 1 from Calvinist Church, 1 from Christian Congregations in Slovakia and 1 from Apostolic Church.

== Culture ==
The village has a public library and a football pitch.
