= Čoltovo =

Village and municipality in Slovakia

Čoltovo Csoltó
- Municipality
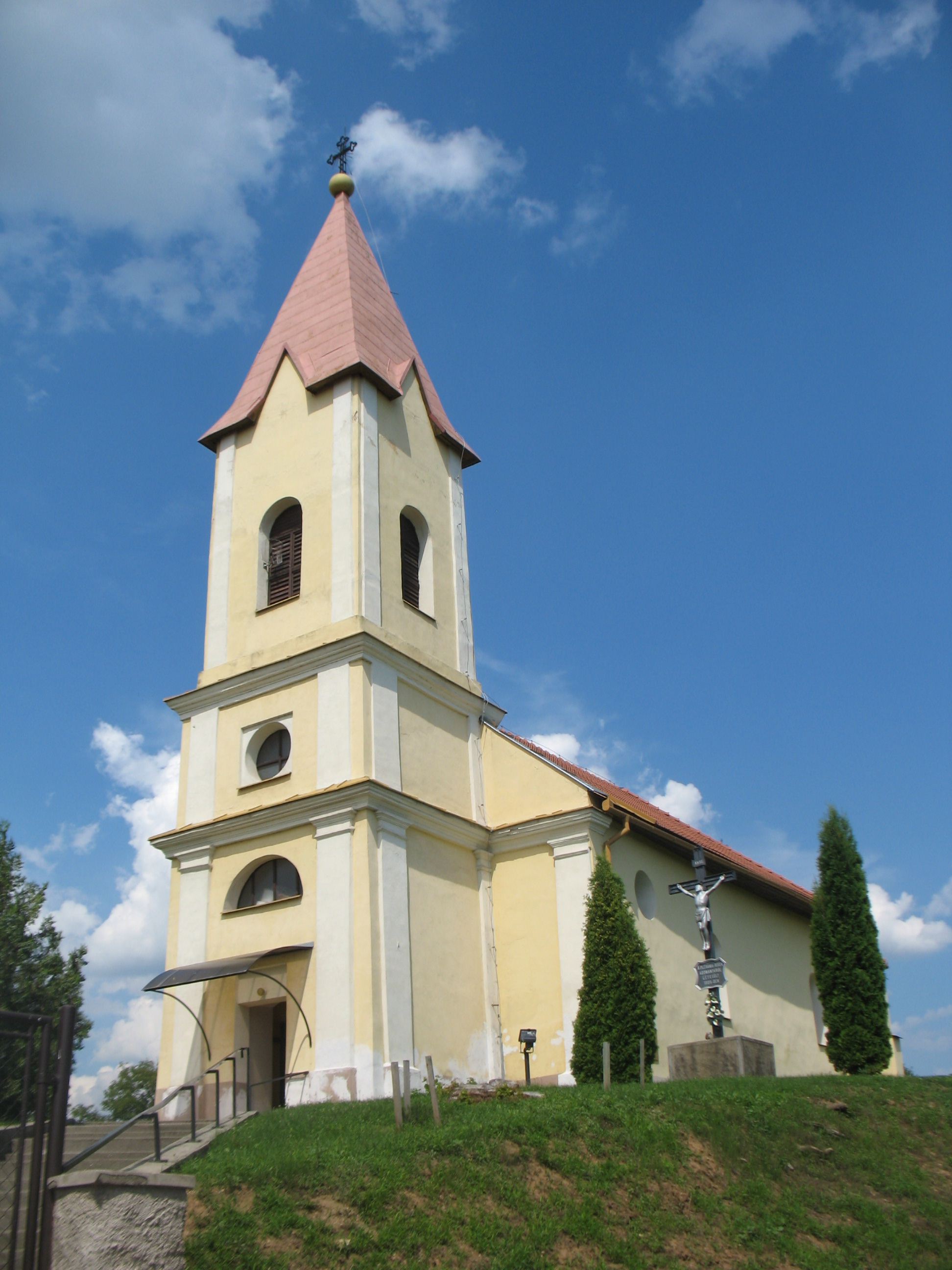

- Flag

- Location of Čoltovo in the Košice Region Location of Čoltovo in Slovakia
- Coordinates: 48.50°N 20.38°E
- Country: Slovakia
- Region: Košice Region
- District: Rožňava District
- First mentioned: 1291

Area
  - Total: 15.38 km^{2} (5.94 sq mi)
- Elevation: 199 m (653 ft)

Population (2025)
  - Total: 461
- Time zone: UTC+1 (CET)
  - Summer (DST): UTC+2 (CEST)
- Postal code: 491 2
- Area code: +421 58
- Vehicle registration plate (until 2022): RV
- Website: www.coltovo.sk

Čoltovo (Hungarian: Csoltó) is a village and municipality in the Rožňava District in the Košice Region of eastern Slovakia.

== History ==
In historical records the village was first mentioned in 1291. Before the establishment of independent Czechoslovakia in 1918, Čoltovo was part of Gömör and Kishont County within the Kingdom of Hungary. From 1938 to 1945, it was again part of Hungary as a result of the First Vienna Award.

== Geography ==
The municipality lies at an altitude of 199 metres (653 ft) and covers an area of 15.38 km^{2} (5.94 sq mi) (2025).

== Population ==
Population statistic (10 years)
Year	1995	2005	2015	2025
Count	418	468	476	461
Difference		+11.96%	+1.70%	−3.15%

Population statistic
Year	2024	2025
Count	470	461
Difference		−1.91%

It has a population of 461 people (31 December 2025).

=== Ethnicity ===
Census 2021 (1+ %)
Ethnicity	Number	Fraction
Hungarian	402	84.27%
Romani	107	22.43%
Slovak	87	18.23%
Not found out	15	3.14%
Total	477	

In year 2021 was 477 people by ethnicity 402 as Hungarian, 107 as Romani, 87 as Slovak, 15 as Not found out, 2 as Irish and 1 as Czech.

Note on population: The difference values of population numbers in the table "Population statistic" and in the sections "Ethnicity" & "Religion" is caused by the use of various statistical methods.

=== Religion ===
Census 2021 (1+ %)
Religion	Number	Fraction
Roman Catholic Church	336	70.44%
None	69	14.47%
Calvinist Church	24	5.03%
Evangelical Church	24	5.03%
Not found out	9	1.89%
Total	477	

In year 2021 was 477 people by religion 336 from Roman Catholic Church, 69 from None, 24 from Calvinist Church, 24 from Evangelical Church, 9 from Not found out, 4 from Jehovah's Witnesses, 4 from Greek Catholic Church, 3 from Other, 1 from Old Catholic Church, 1 from Other and not ascertained christian church, 1 from Islam and 1 from Buddhism.

== Culture ==
The village has a small public library, a football pitch, and a food store.

== Genealogical resources ==
The records for genealogical research are available at the state archive "Statny Archiv in Banska Bystrica, Kosice, Slovakia"

- Roman Catholic church records (births/marriages/deaths): 1825-1896 (parish A)
- Lutheran church records (births/marriages/deaths): 1805-1908 (parish B)
- Reformated church records (births/marriages/deaths): 1792-1904 (parish B)

== See also ==
- List of municipalities and towns in Slovakia
