= Pašková =

Village and municipality in Slovakia

Pašková Páskaháza
- Municipality
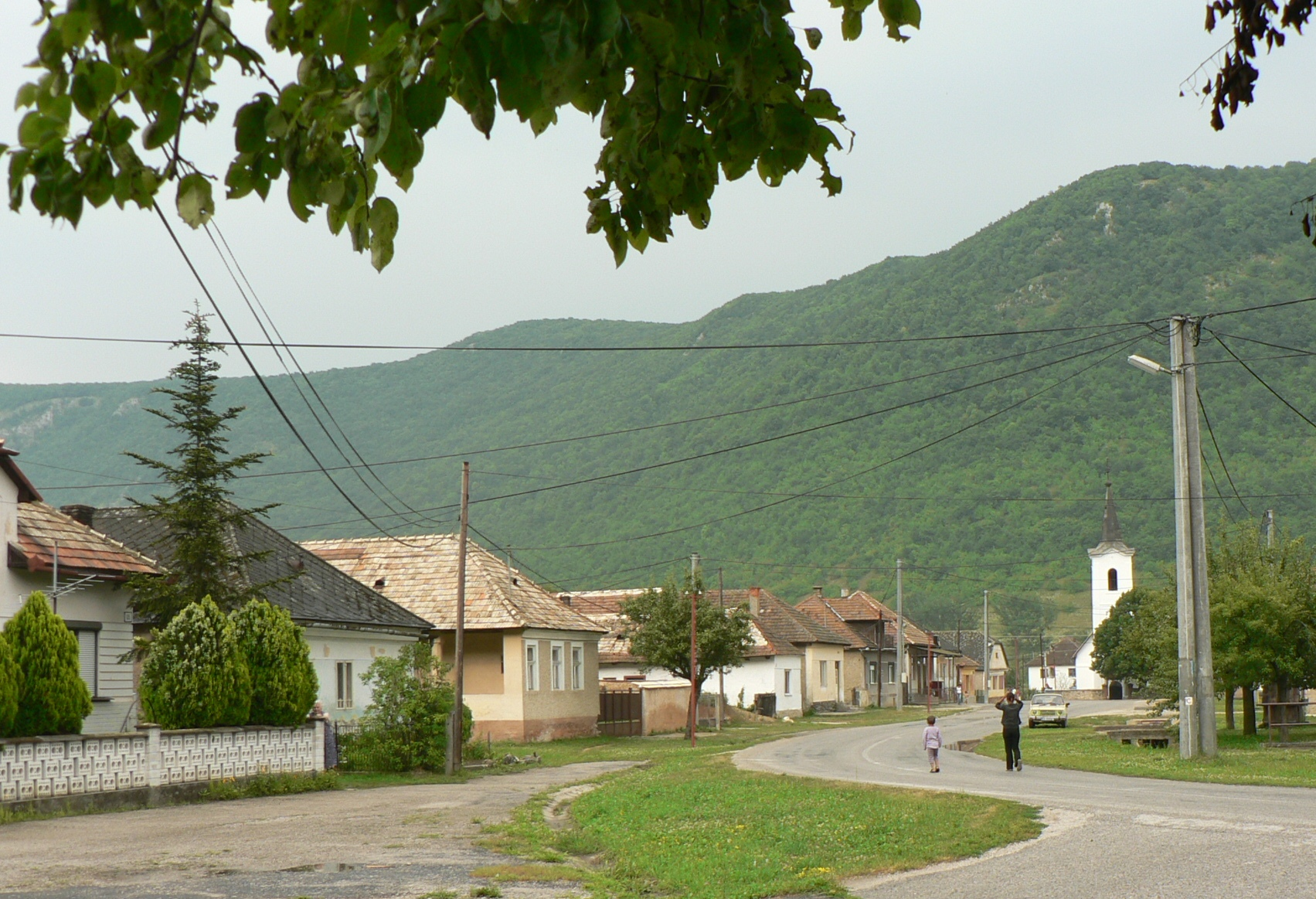

- Flag

- Location of Pašková in the Košice Region Location of Pašková in Slovakia
- Coordinates: 48.60°N 20.38°E
- Country: Slovakia
- Region: Košice Region
- District: Rožňava District
- First mentioned: 1318

Area
  - Total: 6.00 km^{2} (2.32 sq mi)
- Elevation: 237 m (778 ft)

Population (2025)
  - Total: 328
- Time zone: UTC+1 (CET)
  - Summer (DST): UTC+2 (CEST)
- Postal code: 493 3
- Area code: +421 58
- Vehicle registration plate (until 2022): RV
- Website: www.paskova.sk

Pašková (Hungarian: Páskaháza) is a village and municipality in the Rožňava District in the Košice Region of middle-eastern Slovakia. The Hungarian name is Páskaháza.

== History ==
In historical records the village was first mentioned in 1318. Before the establishment of independent Czechoslovakia in 1918, Pašková was part of Gömör and Kishont County within the Kingdom of Hungary. From 1938 to 1945, it was again part of Hungary as a result of the First Vienna Award.

== Geography ==
The municipality lies at an altitude of 237 metres (778 ft) and covers an area of 6.00 km^{2} (2.32 sq mi) (2025).

The village is situated in a valley oriented from north to south. The eastern mountain chain has its local peak near the village called Nagyhegy, or "Big Hill."

A river flows through it, called Sajo (in Hungarian).

== Population ==
Population statistic (10 years)
Year	1995	2005	2015	2025
Count	278	282	341	328
Difference		+1.43%	+20.92%	−3.81%

Population statistic
Year	2024	2025
Count	335	328
Difference		−2.08%

It has a population of 328 people (31 December 2025).

=== Ethnicity ===
Census 2021 (1+ %)
Ethnicity	Number	Fraction
Slovak	204	60.17%
Hungarian	144	42.47%
Romani	93	27.43%
Not found out	28	8.25%
Total	339	

In year 2021 was 339 people by ethnicity 204 as Slovak, 144 as Hungarian, 93 as Romani and 28 as Not found out.

Note on population: The difference values of population numbers in the table "Population statistic" and in the sections "Ethnicity" & "Religion" is caused by the use of various statistical methods.

The vast majority of the municipality's population consists of the local Roma community. In 2019, they constituted an estimated 80% of the local population.

=== Religion ===
Census 2021 (1+ %)
Religion	Number	Fraction
None	182	53.69%
Calvinist Church	46	13.57%
Roman Catholic Church	37	10.91%
Jehovah's Witnesses	26	7.67%
Not found out	22	6.49%
United Methodist Church	11	3.24%
Evangelical Church	7	2.06%
Christian Congregations in Slovakia	6	1.77%
Total	339	

In year 2021 was 339 people by religion 182 from None, 46 from Calvinist Church, 37 from Roman Catholic Church, 26 from Jehovah's Witnesses, 22 from Not found out, 11 from United Methodist Church, 7 from Evangelical Church, 6 from Christian Congregations in Slovakia, 1 from Old Catholic Church and 1 from Other and not ascertained christian church.

Most of the village has always been Hungarian speaking.

== Culture ==
The most important building (apart from the pub) is the church.

The village has a public library.

== Economy ==
The village's economy has always been agricultural. With the rise of communism in the second half of the 20th century, individual farmers were more or less forcibly consolidated in a local collective farm (similar to Soviet kolchoz). The economic situation of the now private collective farm is uncertain.

There is a small local shop with consumer credit activities and a small local pub, but the pub has been closed down recently, however, because of violence.
