= Gočovo =

Village and municipality in Slovakia

Gočovo Gócs
- Municipality

- Flag

- Location of Gočovo in the Košice Region Location of Gočovo in Slovakia
- Coordinates: 48.77°N 20.42°E
- Country: Slovakia
- Region: Košice Region
- District: Rožňava District
- First mentioned: 1247

Area
  - Total: 14.65 km^{2} (5.66 sq mi)
- Elevation: 390 m (1,280 ft)

Population (2025)
  - Total: 291
- Time zone: UTC+1 (CET)
  - Summer (DST): UTC+2 (CEST)
- Postal code: 492 4
- Area code: +421 58
- Vehicle registration plate (until 2022): RV
- Website: www.gocovo.sk

Gočovo (Hungarian: Gócs German: Goldshof or Helbesdorf) is a village and large municipality in the Rožňava District in the Košice Region of middle-eastern Slovakia.

== History ==
In historical records the village was first mentioned in 1247. Before the establishment of independent Czechoslovakia in 1918, Gočovo was part of Gömör and Kishont County within the Kingdom of Hungary. From 1939 to 1945, it was part of the Slovak Republic.

== Geography ==
The municipality lies at an altitude of 390 metres (1,280 ft) and covers an area of 14.65 km^{2} (5.66 sq mi) (2025).

== Population ==
Population statistic (10 years)
Year	1995	2005	2015	2025
Count	413	397	351	291
Difference		−3.87%	−11.58%	−17.09%

Population statistic
Year	2024	2025
Count	291	291
Difference		+0%

It has a population of 291 people (31 December 2025).

=== Ethnicity ===
Census 2021 (1+%)
Ethnicity	Number	Fraction
Slovak	312	98.73%
Total	316	

In year 2021 was 316 people by ethnicity 312 as Slovak, 3 as Romani, 2 as Not found out, 2 as Hungarian, 1 as Ukrainian and 1 as Russian.

Note on population: The difference values of population numbers in the table "Population statistic" and in the sections "Ethnicity" & "Religion" is caused by the use of various statistical methods.

=== Religion ===
Census 2021 (1+%)
Religion	Number	Fraction
Evangelical Church	167	52.85%
None	120	37.97%
Roman Catholic Church	15	4.75%
Greek Catholic Church	5	1.58%
Total	316	

In year 2021 was 316 people by religion 167 from Evangelical Church, 120 from None, 15 from Roman Catholic Church, 5 from Greek Catholic Church, 2 from Not found out, 2 from Ad hoc movements, 1 from Calvinist Church, 1 from Eastern Orthodox Church, 1 from Christian Congregations in Slovakia, 1 from Other and 1 from Hinduism.

== Culture ==
The village has a public library and a football pitch.

== Genealogical resources ==
The records for genealogical research are available at the state archive "Statny Archiv in Banska Bystrica, Kosice, Slovakia"

- Greek Catholic church records (births/marriages/deaths): 1818-1895 (parish B)
- Lutheran church records (births/marriages/deaths): 1711-1925 (parish B)

== See also ==
- List of municipalities and towns in Slovakia
