= Jovice =

Village and municipality in Slovakia

Jovice Jólész
- Municipality
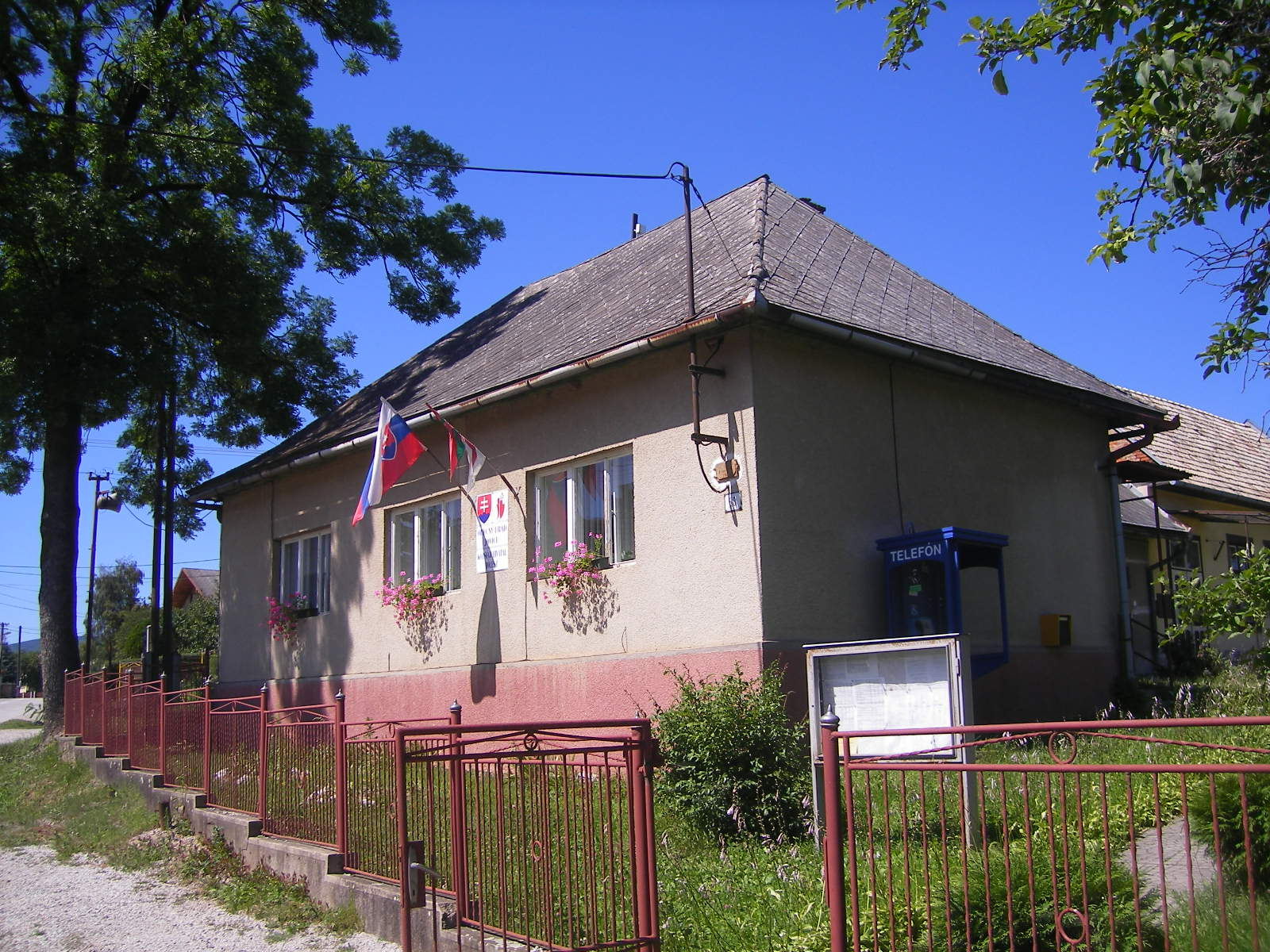

- Flag

- Location of Jovice in the Košice Region Location of Jovice in Slovakia
- Coordinates: 48.63°N 20.55°E
- Country: Slovakia
- Region: Košice Region
- District: Rožňava District
- First mentioned: 1352

Area
  - Total: 10.07 km^{2} (3.89 sq mi)
- Elevation: 294 m (965 ft)

Population (2025)
  - Total: 825
- Time zone: UTC+1 (CET)
  - Summer (DST): UTC+2 (CEST)
- Postal code: 494 1
- Area code: +421 58
- Vehicle registration plate (until 2022): RV
- Website: www.obecjovice.sk

Jovice (Hungarian: Jólész) is a village and municipality in the Rožňava District in the Košice Region of middle-eastern Slovakia.

== History ==
In historical records the village was first mentioned in 1352.

Jovice arose around the turn of the 13th to the 14th century on the territory of the nearby Krásna Hôrka Castle and was first mentioned in 1352 as Pachapataka . The current name appears in 1427 in the form Jolees; In the same year the Bebek family owned 19 Porta in the village. In the 16th century Wallachians settled in Jovice as part of the Wallachian colonization. In 1773 there lived 22 subjects, 11 serfs and eight Wallachians. In 1828 there were 66 houses and 395 inhabitants who were employed as farmers.

Before the establishment of independent Czechoslovakia in 1918, Jovice was part of Gömör and Kishont County within the Kingdom of Hungary. From 1938 to 1944, it was once again part of Hungary as a result of the First Vienna Award.

== Geography ==
The municipality lies at an altitude of 294 metres (965 ft) and covers an area of 10.07 km^{2} (3.89 sq mi) (2025).

The community is located in the Slovak Karst in the valley basin Rožňavská kotlina, below the Silica Karst plateau to the south. The plateau is separated from the village itself by the small river Čremošná, which flows into the Sajó / Slaná at Brzotín. The center of the village is at an altitude of 280 m (920 ft) and is five and a half kilometers from Rožňava.

Neighboring communities are Krásnohorské Podhradie in the north and northeast, Krásnohorská Dlhá Lúka in the east and southeast, Silica in the south, Brzotín in the southwest and west and Rožňava in the Northwest.

== Culture ==
The village has a public library and a football pitch.

== Population ==
Population statistic (10 years)
Year	1995	2005	2015	2025
Count	607	693	757	825
Difference		+14.16%	+9.23%	+8.98%

Population statistic
Year	2024	2025
Count	820	825
Difference		+0.60%

It has a population of 825 people (31 December 2025).

=== Ethnicity ===
Census 2021 (1+ %)
Ethnicity	Number	Fraction
Hungarian	377	50.19%
Romani	193	25.69%
Slovak	174	23.16%
Not found out	46	6.12%
Total	751	

In year 2021 was 751 people by ethnicity 377 as Hungarian, 193 as Romani, 174 as Slovak, 46 as Not found out, 2 as Other and 1 as Rusyn.

Note on population: The difference values of population numbers in the table "Population statistic" and in the sections "Ethnicity" & "Religion" is caused by the use of various statistical methods.

=== Religion ===
Census 2021 (1+ %)
Religion	Number	Fraction
Roman Catholic Church	410	54.59%
None	178	23.7%
Calvinist Church	67	8.92%
Not found out	40	5.33%
Evangelical Church	36	4.79%
Total	751	

In year 2021 was 751 people by religion 410 from Roman Catholic Church, 178 from None, 67 from Calvinist Church, 40 from Not found out, 36 from Evangelical Church, 7 from Jehovah's Witnesses, 7 from Greek Catholic Church, 3 from United Methodist Church, 1 from Old Catholic Church, 1 from Other and 1 from Baptists Church.

According to the 2011 census, Jovice had 726 inhabitants, including 546 Hungarians, 130 Slovaks and 21 Roma. 29 residents gave no information about Ethnicity.

439 residents committed themselves to the Roman Catholic Church, 80 residents to the Reformed Church, 51 residents to the Evangelical Church A. B., five residents to the Evangelical Methodist Church and one resident each to the Jehovah's Witnesses and one to the Greek Catholic Church; one resident professed a different denomination. 93 inhabitants had no denomination and the denomination of 55 inhabitants was not determined.

== Genealogical resources ==
The records for genealogical research are available at the state archive "Statny Archiv in Kosice, Slovakia"

- Roman Catholic church records (births/marriages/deaths): 1686-1895 (parish B)
- Lutheran church records (births/marriages/deaths): 1632-1925 (parish B)
- Reformed church records (births/marriages/deaths): 1773-1943 (parish B)

== See also ==
- List of municipalities and towns in Slovakia
