= Henckovce =

Village and municipality in Slovakia

Henckovce Henzendorf
- Municipality
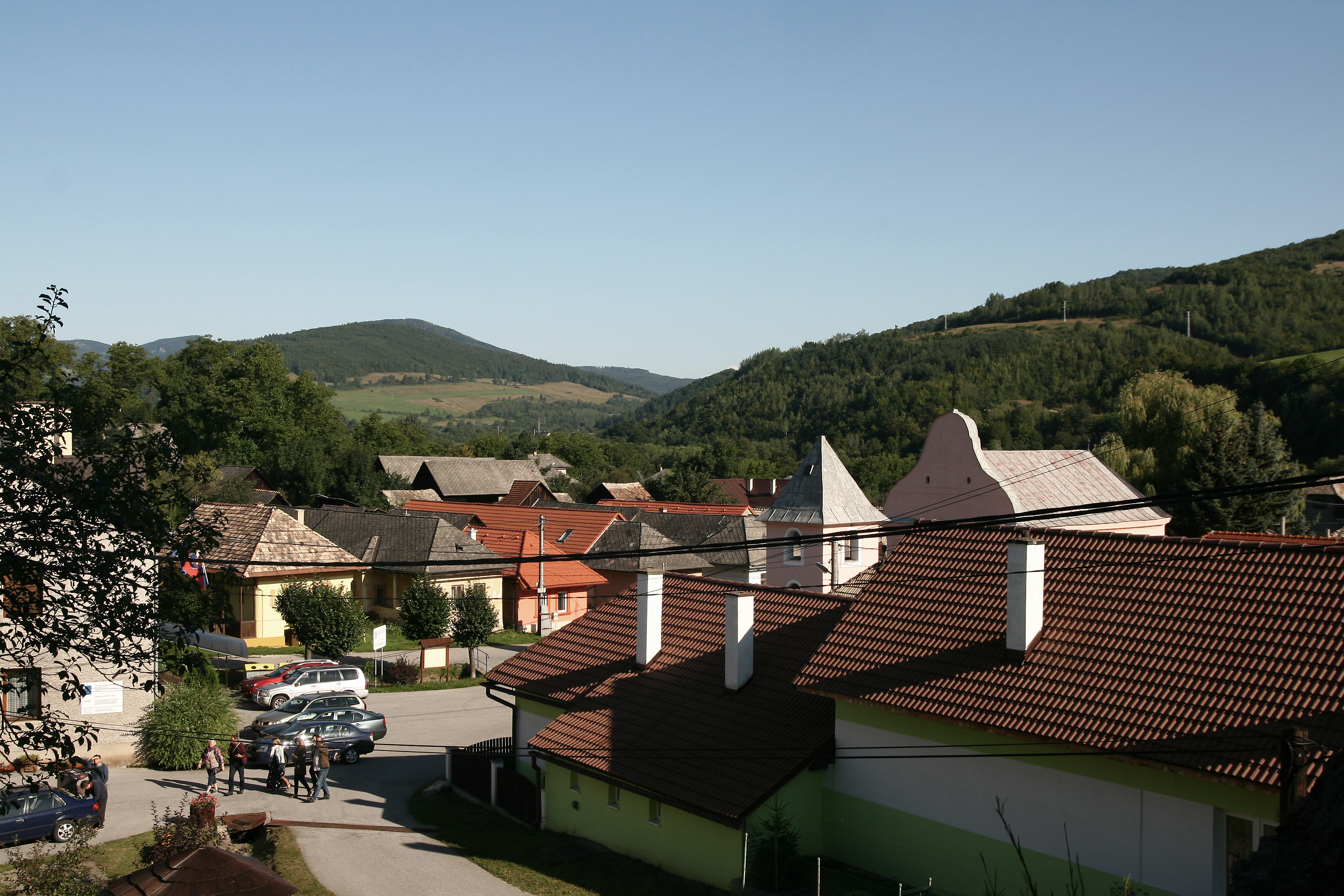

- Flag

- Location of Henckovce in the Košice Region Location of Henckovce in Slovakia
- Coordinates: 48.72°N 20.43°E
- Country: Slovakia
- Region: Košice Region
- District: Rožňava District
- First mentioned: 1470

Area
  - Total: 10.03 km^{2} (3.87 sq mi)
- Elevation: 346 m (1,135 ft)

Population (2025)
  - Total: 382
- Time zone: UTC+1 (CET)
  - Summer (DST): UTC+2 (CEST)
- Postal code: 492 3
- Area code: +421 58
- Vehicle registration plate (until 2022): RV
- Website: www.henckovce.sk

Henckovce (1470 Henczko, Hentzendorf, 1551 Henczkowcze, 1563 Henczowetz, 1590 Henczkowa) (German: Henzendorf; Hungarian: Henckó) is a village and municipality in the Rožňava District in the Košice Region of eastern Slovakia.

== History ==
Henckovce was founded under Vlach law. In historical records the village was first mentioned in 1470 when some Germans settled there. The Bebek family ruled the village in the past and here transferred Rusyn colonists known as Walachian. Before the establishment of independent Czechoslovakia in 1918, Henckovce was part of Gömör and Kishont County within the Kingdom of Hungary. From 1939 to 1945, it was part of the Slovak Republic.

== Geography ==
The municipality lies at an altitude of 346 metres (1,135 ft) and covers an area of 10.03 km^{2} (3.87 sq mi) (2025).

== Population ==
Population statistic (10 years)
Year	1995	2005	2015	2025
Count	385	431	443	382
Difference		+11.94%	+2.78%	−13.76%

Population statistic
Year	2024	2025
Count	387	382
Difference		−1.29%

It has a population of 382 people (31 December 2025).

=== Ethnicity ===
Census 2021 (1+ %)
Ethnicity	Number	Fraction
Slovak	381	95.96%
Romani	22	5.54%
Not found out	18	4.53%
Total	397	

In year 2021 was 397 people by ethnicity 381 as Slovak, 22 as Romani, 18 as Not found out, 2 as Hungarian and 1 as Rusyn.

Note on population: The difference values of population numbers in the table "Population statistic" and in the sections "Ethnicity" & "Religion" is caused by the use of various statistical methods.

=== Religion ===
Census 2021 (1+ %)
Religion	Number	Fraction
None	161	40.55%
Evangelical Church	137	34.51%
Roman Catholic Church	62	15.62%
Not found out	20	5.04%
Jehovah's Witnesses	6	1.51%
Greek Catholic Church	4	1.01%
Total	397	

In year 2021 was 397 people by religion 161 from None, 137 from Evangelical Church, 62 from Roman Catholic Church, 20 from Not found out, 6 from Jehovah's Witnesses, 4 from Greek Catholic Church, 3 from Eastern Orthodox Church, 1 from Other, 1 from Hinduism, 1 from United Methodist Church and 1 from Ad hoc movements.

== Culture ==
The village has a small public library.

== Genealogical resources ==
The records for genealogical research are available at the state archive "Statny Archiv in Kosice, Slovakia"

- Lutheran church records (births/marriages/deaths): 1815-1900 (parish B)

== See also ==
- List of municipalities and towns in Slovakia
