= Krásnohorské Podhradie =

Krásnohorské Podhradie Krasznahorkaváralja
- Municipality
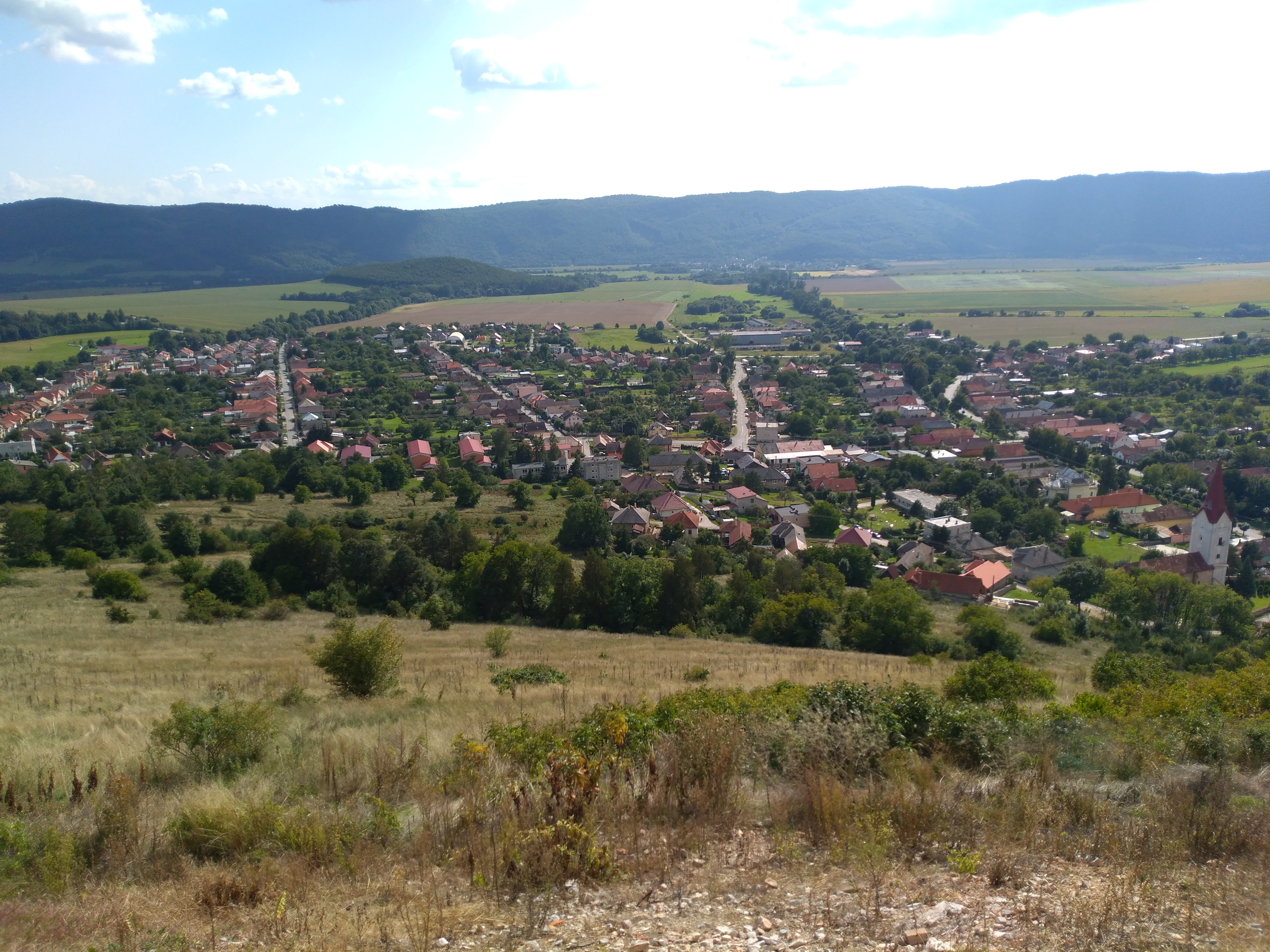

- Flag

- Location of Krásnohorské Podhradie in the Košice Region Location of Krásnohorské Podhradie in Slovakia
- Coordinates: 48.65°N 20.60°E
- Country: Slovakia
- Region: Košice Region
- District: Rožňava District
- First mentioned: 1322

Area
  - Total: 23.17 km^{2} (8.95 sq mi)
- Elevation: 354 m (1,161 ft)

Population (2025)
  - Total: 2,861
- Time zone: UTC+1 (CET)
  - Summer (DST): UTC+2 (CEST)
- Postal code: 494 1
- Area code: +421 58
- Vehicle registration plate (until 2022): RV
- Website: www.krasnohorskepodhradie.sk

Krásnohorské Podhradie (Hungarian: Krasznahorkaváralja) is a village and municipality in the Rožňava District in the Košice Region of middle-eastern Slovakia.

The town has a relative Hungarian majority and a Slovak and Roma minority. The town is dominated by its namesake, the iconic Castle of Krásna Hôrka.

== History ==
In historical records the village was first mentioned in 1322. Before the establishment of independent Czechoslovakia in 1918, Krásnohorské Podhradie was part of Gömör and Kishont County within the Kingdom of Hungary. From 1938 to 1945, it was again part of Hungary as a result of the First Vienna Award.

== Geography ==
The municipality lies at an altitude of 354 metres (1,161 ft) and covers an area of 23.17 km^{2} (8.95 sq mi) (2025).

== Population ==
Population statistic (10 years)
Year	1995	2005	2015	2025
Count	2086	2525	2640	2861
Difference		+21.04%	+4.55%	+8.37%

Population statistic
Year	2024	2025
Count	2832	2861
Difference		+1.02%

It has a population of 2861 people (31 December 2025).

=== Ethnicity ===
Census 2021 (1+ %)
Ethnicity	Number	Fraction
Slovak	1165	41.71%
Hungarian	840	30.07%
Romani	721	25.81%
Not found out	245	8.77%
Total	2793	

In year 2021 was 2793 people by ethnicity 1165 as Slovak, 840 as Hungarian, 721 as Romani, 245 as Not found out, 21 as Czech, 5 as Other, 2 as Rusyn, 1 as Vietnamese, 1 as Ukrainian, 1 as Russian, 1 as Polish, 1 as German and 1 as French.

Note on population: The difference values of population numbers in the table "Population statistic" and in the sections "Ethnicity" & "Religion" is caused by the use of various statistical methods.

=== Religion ===
Census 2021 (1+ %)
Religion	Number	Fraction
None	1528	54.71%
Roman Catholic Church	760	27.21%
Not found out	221	7.91%
Jehovah's Witnesses	95	3.4%
Evangelical Church	54	1.93%
Calvinist Church	47	1.68%
Greek Catholic Church	28	1%
Total	2793	

In year 2021 was 2793 people by religion 1528 from None, 760 from Roman Catholic Church, 221 from Not found out, 95 from Jehovah's Witnesses, 54 from Evangelical Church, 47 from Calvinist Church, 28 from Greek Catholic Church, 27 from Apostolic Church, 11 from Christian Congregations in Slovakia, 5 from Other, 5 from Ad hoc movements, 4 from Other and not ascertained christian church, 4 from Buddhism, 2 from Old Catholic Church, 1 from Eastern Orthodox Church and 1 from United Methodist Church.

== Culture ==
The village has a public library, a football pitch, and an iconic Andrássy Castle of Krásna Hôrka. The castle was burned down in 2012.

== Gallery ==
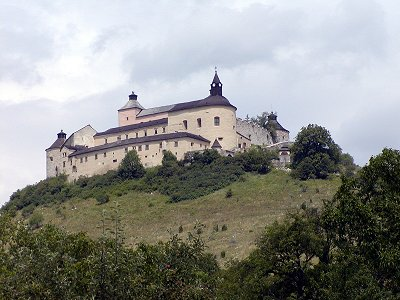

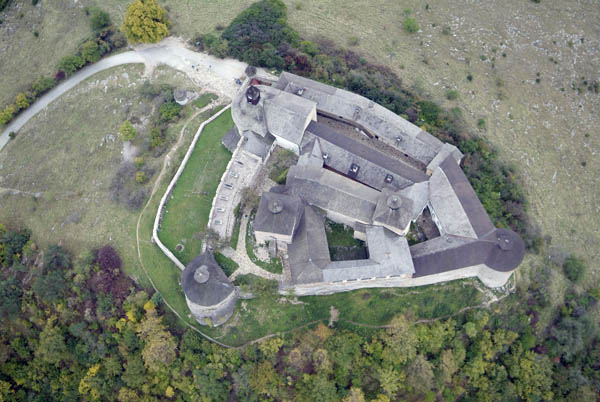

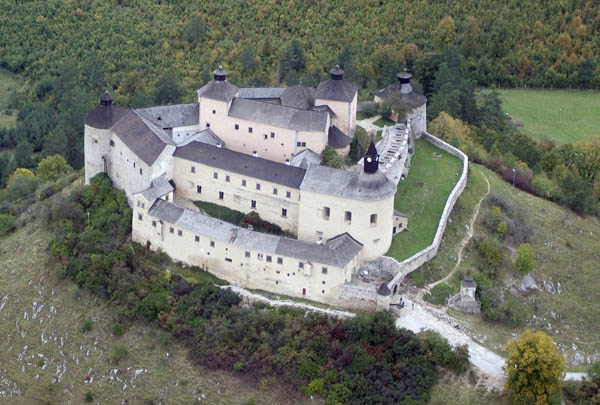

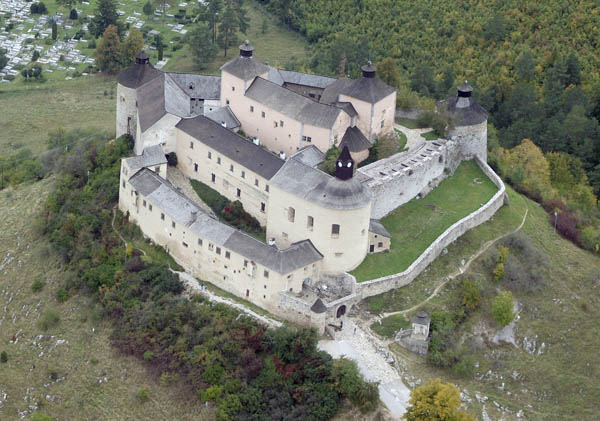

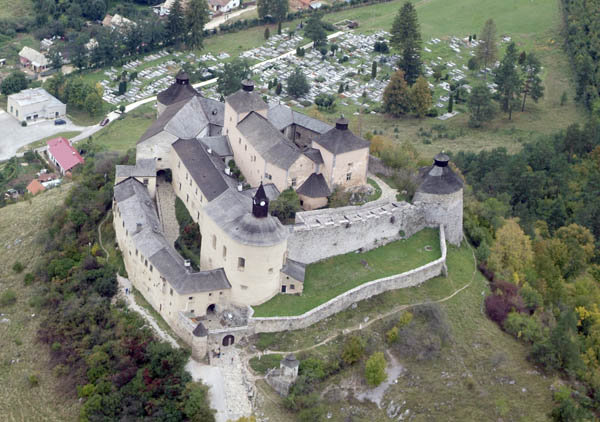
