= Brzotín =

Brzotín Berzéte
- Municipality
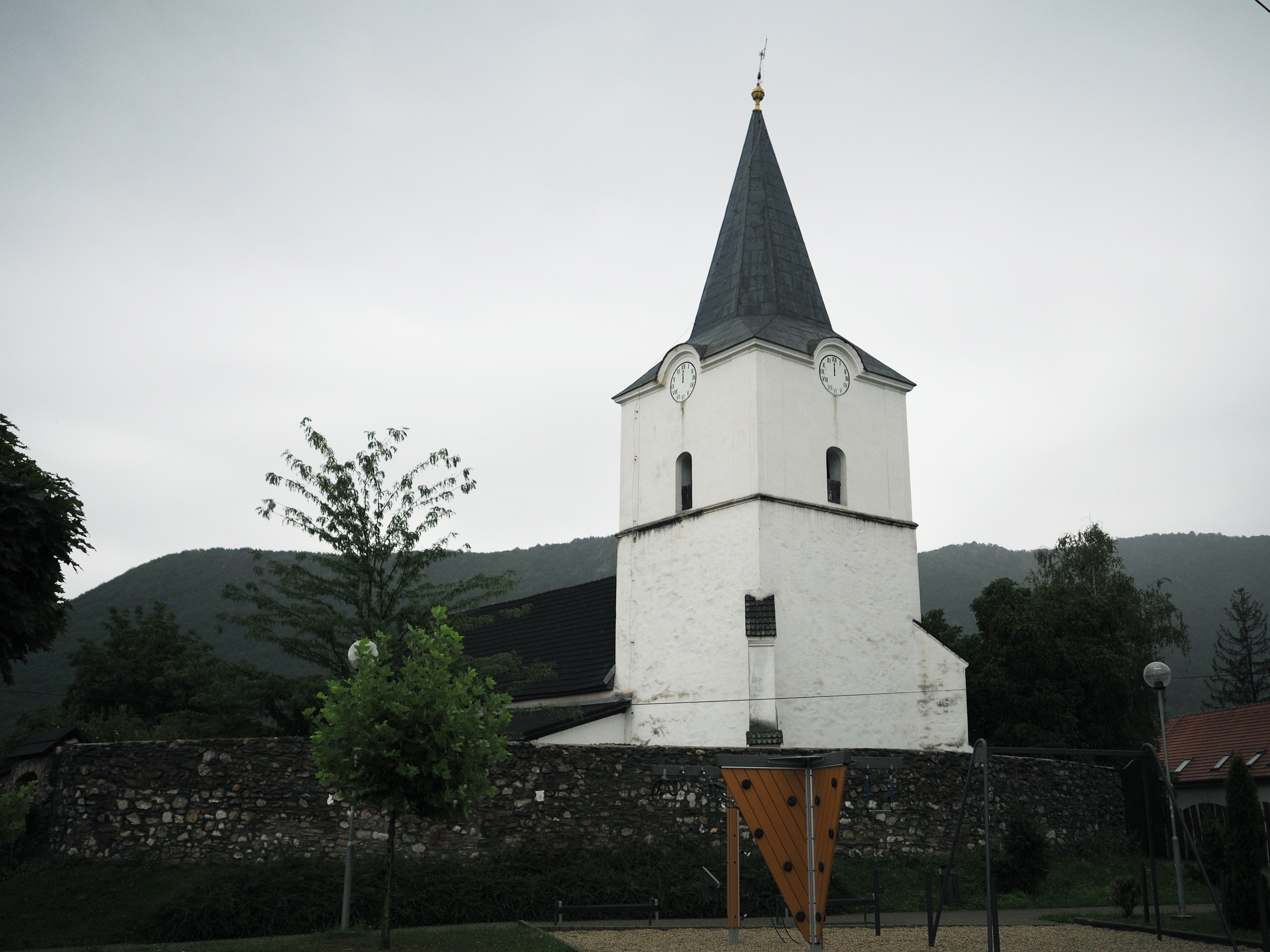

- Flag

- Location of Brzotín in the Košice Region Location of Brzotín in Slovakia
- Coordinates: 48.63°N 20.50°E
- Country: Slovakia
- Region: Košice Region
- District: Rožňava District
- First mentioned: 1242

Government
  - Mayor: Róbert Dókus (Ind.)

Area
  - Total: 18.97 km^{2} (7.32 sq mi)
- Elevation: 262 m (860 ft)

Population (2025)
  - Total: 1,372
- Time zone: UTC+1 (CET)
  - Summer (DST): UTC+2 (CEST)
- Postal code: 495 1
- Area code: +421 58
- Vehicle registration plate (until 2022): RV
- Website: www.obecbrzotin.sk

Brzotín (Hungarian: Berzéte) is a village and municipality in the Rožňava District in the Košice Region of eastern Slovakia.

== Geography ==
The municipality lies at an altitude of 262 metres (860 ft) and covers an area of 18.97 km^{2} (7.32 sq mi) (2025).

== History ==
Before the establishment of independent Czechoslovakia in 1918, Brzotín was part of Gömör and Kishont County within the Kingdom of Hungary. From 1938 to 1945, it was again part of Hungary as a result of the First Vienna Award.

== Genealogical resources ==
The records for genealogical research are available at the state archive "Statny Archiv in Kosice, Slovakia"

- Roman Catholic church records (births/marriages/deaths): 1673-1898 (parish B)
- Lutheran church records (births/marriages/deaths): 1632-1925 (parish B)
- Reformated church records (births/marriages/deaths): 1773-1943 (parish A)

== Population ==
Population statistic (10 years)
Year	1995	2005	2015	2025
Count	1136	1269	1349	1372
Difference		+11.70%	+6.30%	+1.70%

Population statistic
Year	2024	2025
Count	1360	1372
Difference		+0.88%

It has a population of 1372 people (31 December 2025).

=== Ethnicity ===
Census 2021 (1+ %)
Ethnicity	Number	Fraction
Slovak	908	67.96%
Hungarian	394	29.49%
Romani	122	9.13%
Not found out	71	5.31%
Total	1336	

In year 2021 was 1336 people by ethnicity 908 as Slovak, 394 as Hungarian, 122 as Romani, 71 as Not found out, 7 as Czech, 1 as Rusyn, 1 as Austrian and 1 as Polish.

Note on population: The difference values of population numbers in the table "Population statistic" and in the sections "Ethnicity" & "Religion" is caused by the use of various statistical methods.

=== Religion ===
Census 2021 (1+ %)
Religion	Number	Fraction
None	705	52.77%
Roman Catholic Church	252	18.86%
Calvinist Church	201	15.04%
Not found out	75	5.61%
Evangelical Church	67	5.01%
Greek Catholic Church	14	1.05%
Total	1336	

In year 2021 was 1336 people by religion 705 from None, 252 from Roman Catholic Church, 201 from Calvinist Church, 75 from Not found out, 67 from Evangelical Church, 14 from Greek Catholic Church, 13 from Jehovah's Witnesses, 2 from United Methodist Church, 1 from Old Catholic Church, 1 from Other and not ascertained christian church, 1 from Christian Congregations in Slovakia, 1 from Other, 1 from Church of the Brethren, 1 from Buddhism and 1 from Ad hoc movements.

== See also ==
- List of municipalities and towns in Slovakia
