= Bebek family =

Hungarian noble family

- Hungarian noble family
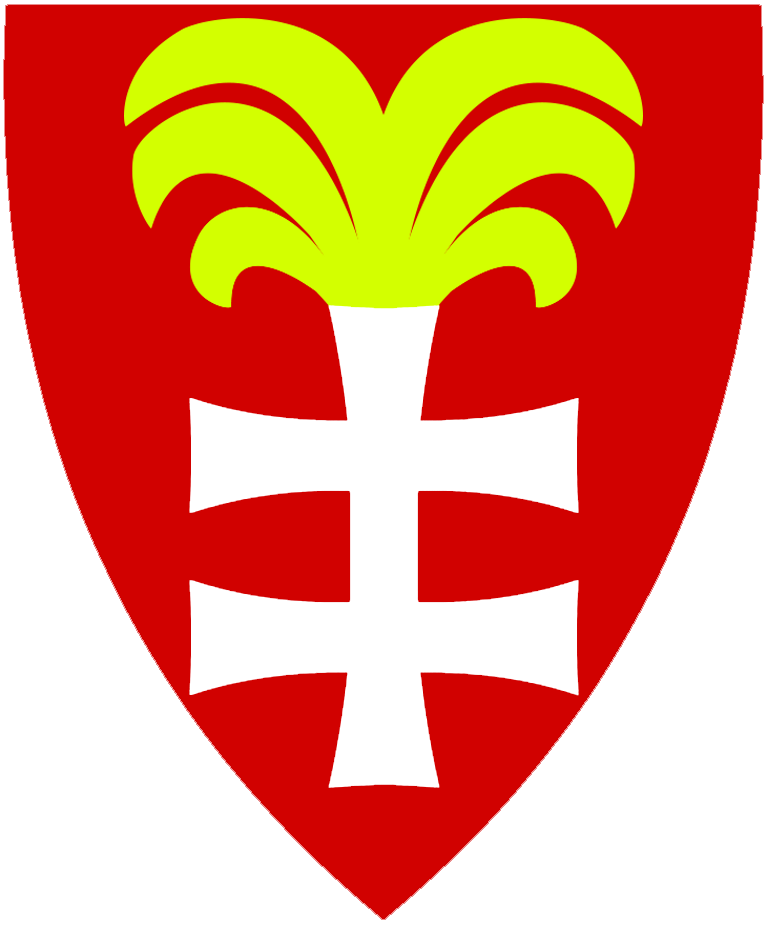
- Parent house: Genus Ákos
- Country: Hungary; Hungary
- Founded: 1318
- Founder: Dominic I
- Final ruler: Paul (Vámos branch); George III (Pelsőc branch)
- Dissolution: 1469 (Vámos branch); 1567 (Pelsőc branch)

The Bebek family (also Bubek) was an ancient Hungarian noble family. The history of this family is connected with the areas in present-day Slovakia, notably in Gemer region, where they had their dominion.

== History ==
The first mention of this family is from the year 1243, when the king Béla IV of Hungary after the Mongol invasion donated domains at upper Gemer to brothers Derek and Philip. Both Slovak and Hungarian historians consider these brothers as members gens (clan) Ákos.

In the year 1318, descendants of Derek and Philip divided their heritage. Family had divided in two lines: Bebek de Pelsőc and Bebek de Csetnek branches, after the centre of their lands (present-day Plešivec and Štítnik, respectively).

Pelsőc (Plešivec) had become the centre of Bebek family. Dominic Bebek decided to build here a castle, and along with the castle, he had built Gothic Church of St. George, which was mentioned for the first time in 1314. In the early 15th century, Gothic funeral chapel was built next to the church, but only one member of the family is buried in it: Ladislaus Bebek.

In the 14th century, construction of Krásna Hôrka Castle (Hungarian: Krasznahorka) started. The Bebek family was the owner of this castle from its construction until 1566, with the exception of short time, when it has been owned by the Máriássy family. After the Bebeks engaged in the conflict with the Emperor, castle in Plešivec was destroyed and Krásna Hôrka Castle was taken from the family. George Bebek had retreated to Transylvania, where he died in 1567, without descendants. The Bebek family have died out.

== Name ==
Two variants of name of this family exist: Bubek and Bebek. Nowadays, in Slovak historiography, both variants are used, but Bebek is more common, in Hungarian historiography, variant Bebek is used almost exclusively.

However, in medieval sources, variant Bubek predominates, it is used in most of charters, as well as on tombstone of George Bebek (created around 1390) and on tombstone of Ladislaus Bebek from 1401.

== Coat of arms ==
The coat of arms of the Bebek family is formed by the silver patriarchal cross, which is placed in the red early Gothic shield. On the top of the cross are placed golden bird feathers. The coat of arms of the Bebek family was evolving and different variants of it exist. On some depictions bars of cross have same length, on some depictions lower bar is longer. Usage of silver patriarchal cross, symbol of ruling Arpád family testifies about close relations to the ruling Árpád dynasty. Heraldic crest of the family is a crowned girl with two fish, which is interpreted as Melusine.

== Family tree ==
- Dominic I (fl. 1307–1333)
  - Stephen I (fl. 1330–1369†) --> Pelsőc branch
    - Ladislaus I (fl. 1370–1403; d. before 1404)
      - John I (fl. 1397–1423†) ∞ Elizabeth N. (fl. 1413–1425)
        - Francis II (fl. 1406–1410)
        - Nicholas IV (fl. 1412–1446) ∞ Catherine Garai (fl. 1435–1437)
        - Stephen III (fl. 1421–1451†) ∞ Margaret Pálóci (fl. 1453–1460)
          - George II (fl. 1447–1478) ∞ Euphrosyne Hédervári (fl. 1467)
            - Francis III (fl. 1478)
            - John II (fl. 1478–1526) ∞ Catherine Somi (fl. 1501–1507)
              - Anthony (fl. 1501)
              - Emeric IV (fl. 1524–1553†) ∞ Helena Arbanáz (fl. 1533)
                - John III
                - Elizabeth
              - Francis IV (fl. 1534–1558†) ∞ (1) Margaret Varkocs, (2) Dorothea Ráskai
                - George III (fl. 1548–1567†) ∞ Sophia Patócsy
                  - Margaret (b. 1553)
                  - Sophia
                  - Judith ∞ Francis Kendi
                  - Anne
                  - Susanna (fl. 1580) ∞ Stephen Báthory
                - Catherine ∞ Francis Perényi
              - Margaret ∞ Christopher Varkocs
            - Dorothea (fl. 1494) ∞ Stephen Rozgonyi
            - Margaret (fl. 1511) ∞ (1) Stephen Telegdi, (2) Gregory Illyei
          - Derek II (fl. 1447)
        - Anglis (fl. 1425)
    - Francis I (fl. 1370–1405; d. before 1406) ∞ N. Rupolújvári
    - Dorothea (fl. 1396–1397) ∞ Peter Cudar (1395†)
  - George I (fl. 1330–1390†) --> Vámos branch
    - Emeric I (fl. 1370–1395)
      - Ursula (fl. 1393–1409) ∞ (1) Mikcs Mikcsfi, (2) Juga Racsai
      - Stephen II (fl. 1397)
      - Ladislaus II (fl. 1401–1420) ∞ Dorothea N. (fl. 1413)
        - Emeric III (fl. 1419–1448†) ∞ Veronica Pálóci (fl. 1455–1498)
          - Job (fl. 1450)
          - Paul (fl. 1450–1469†)
          - Ursula (fl. 1469–1486) ∞ Emeric Zápolya
          - Sophia (fl. 1470–1492) ∞ Simon Drugeth
      - Andrew (fl. 1401–1415; d. before 1416)
      - Dominic III (fl. 1400–1404†)
    - Derek I (fl. 1370–1404†) ∞ Clara N. (fl. 1413)
      - Nicholas II (fl. 1388–1399; d. before 1400)
      - Emeric II (fl. 1392–1404†)
      - Peter (fl. 1404–1439; d. before 1440) ∞ Catherine Csáki (fl. 1449)
        - Ladislaus III (fl. 1445)
      - Anne (fl. 1413)
      - Elizabeth ∞ Ivaniš Nelipić
      - Nicholas III (fl. 1404–1430)
        - Ladislaus IV (fl. 1429–1448†)
    - daughter (fl. 1414) ∞ Ladislaus Bánfi de Alsólendva (1414†)
  - Dominic II (fl. 1333–1374†)
  - Nicholas I (fl. 1333–1381)

== Dominions ==
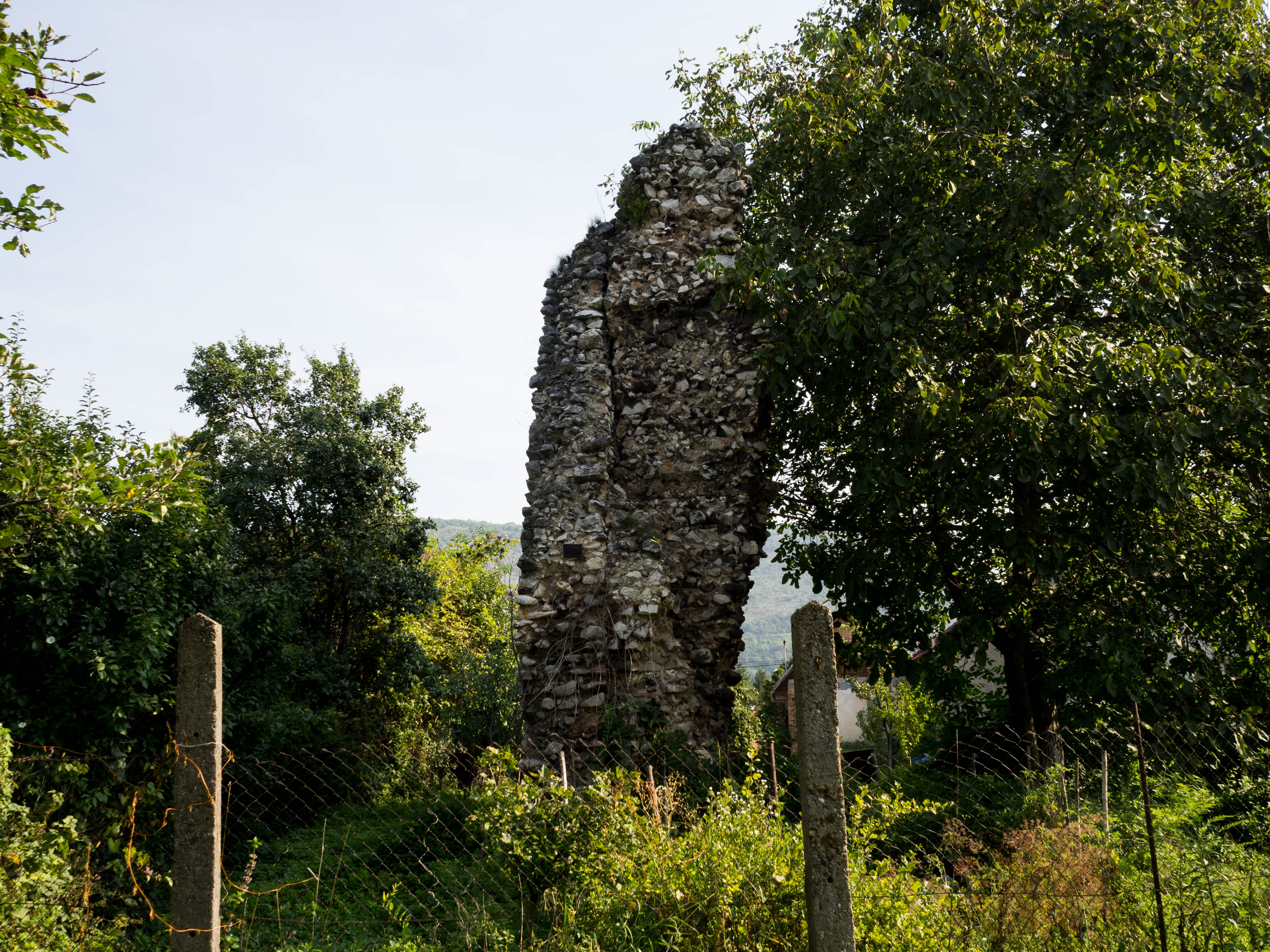
Ruins of Plešivec castle

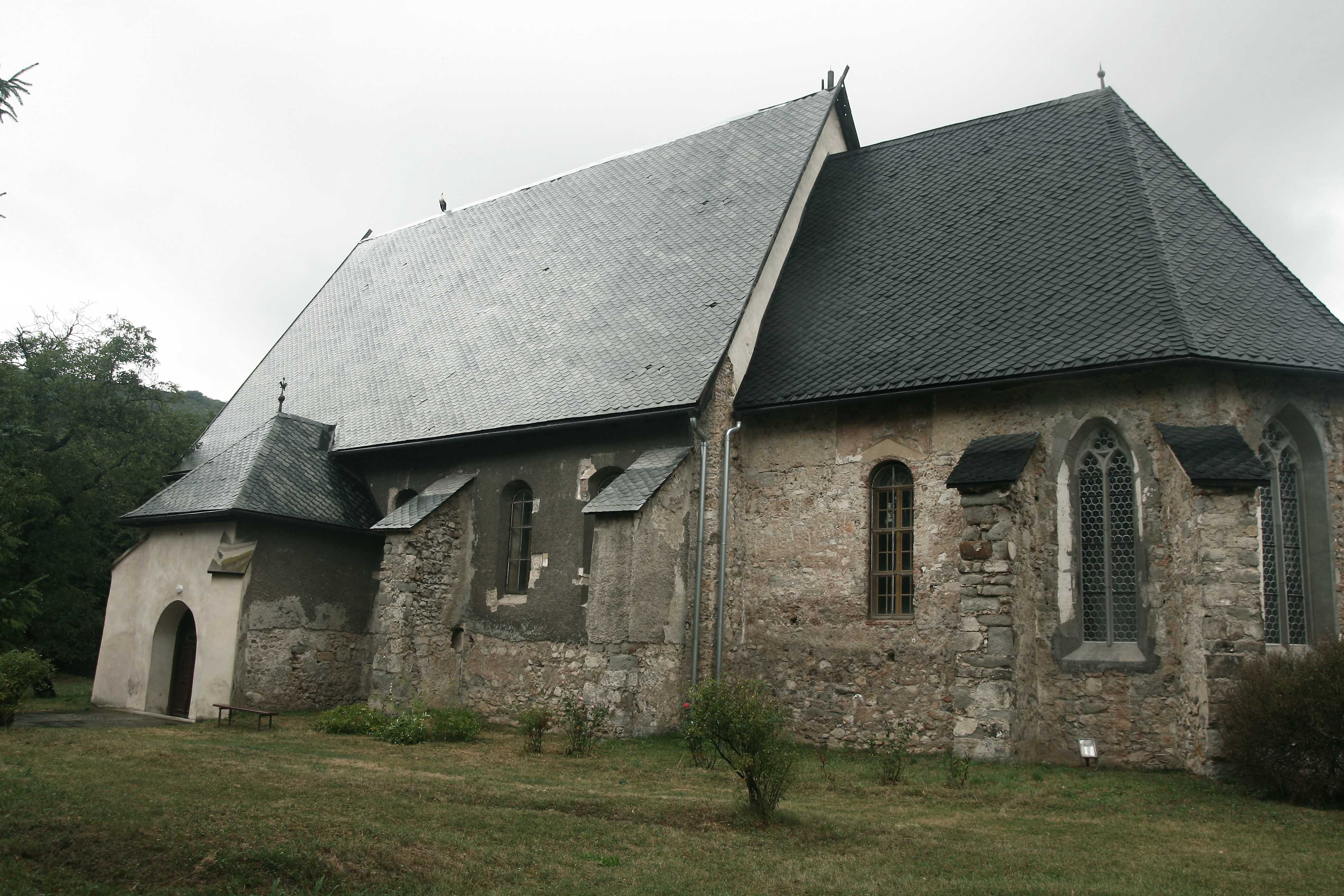
Gothic Church of St. George in Plešivec

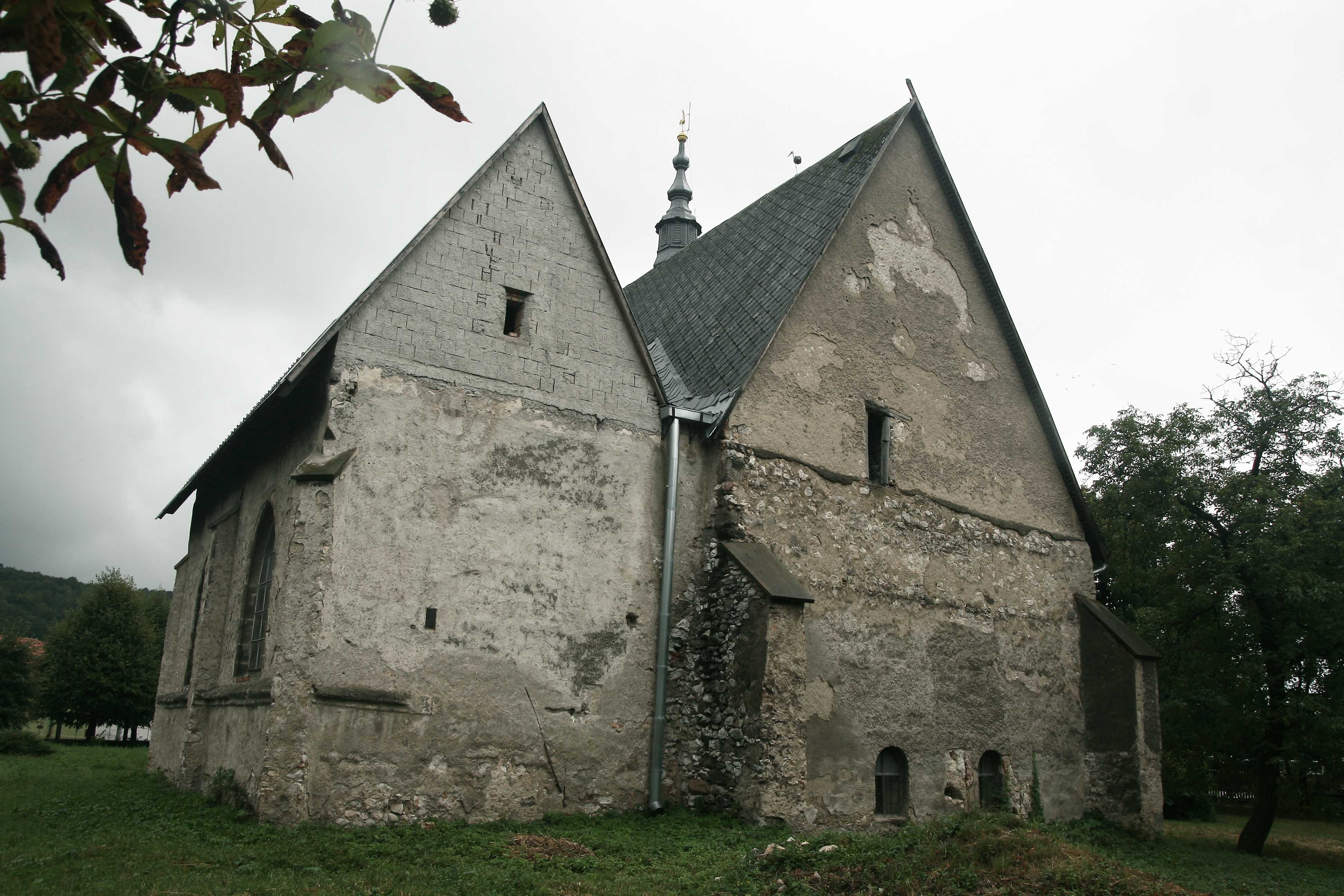
Gothic Church of St. George in Plešivec, along with the funeral chapel of Bebek family.

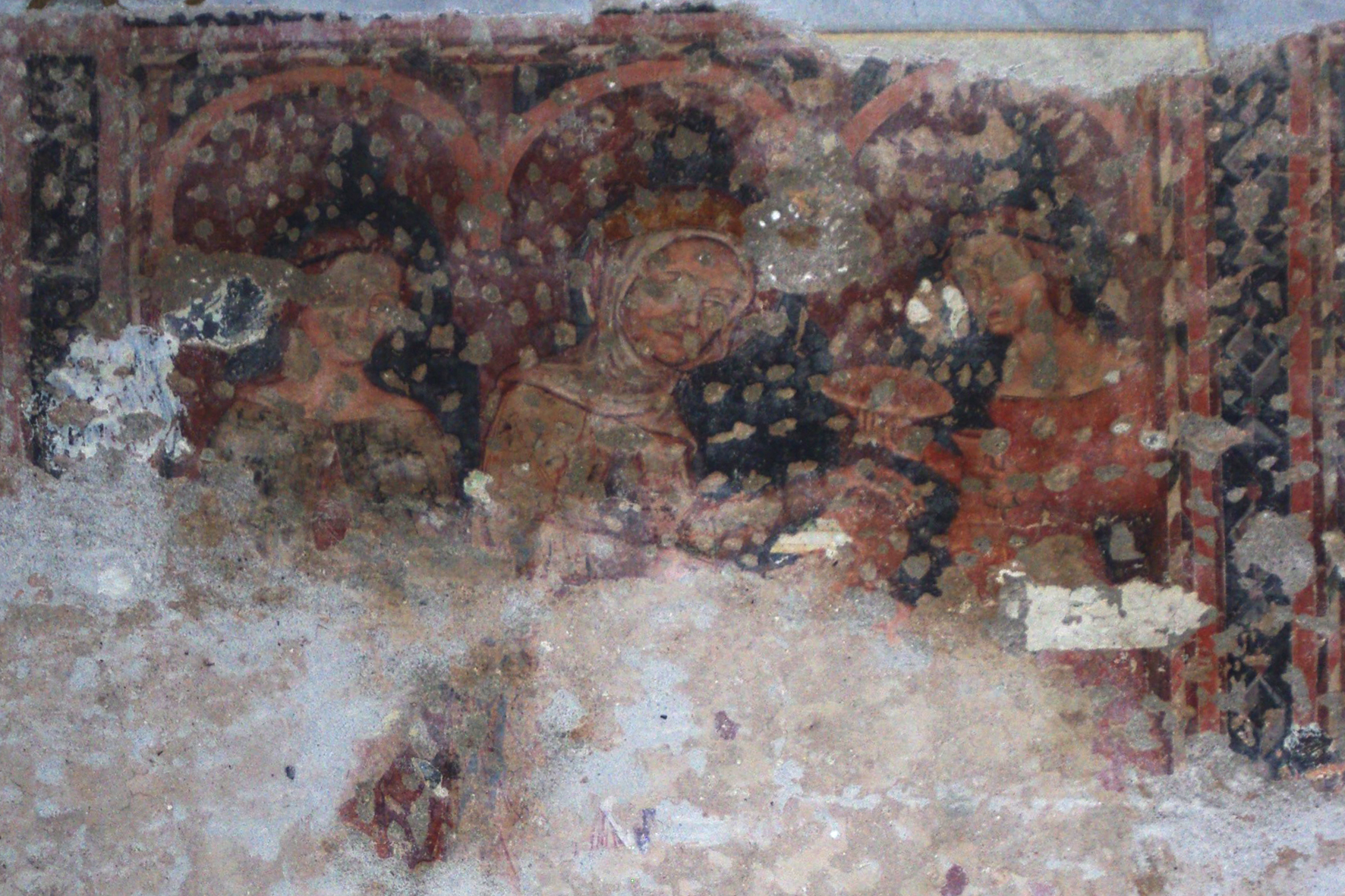
High quality frescoes in church in Plešivec show the wealth of the Bebek family

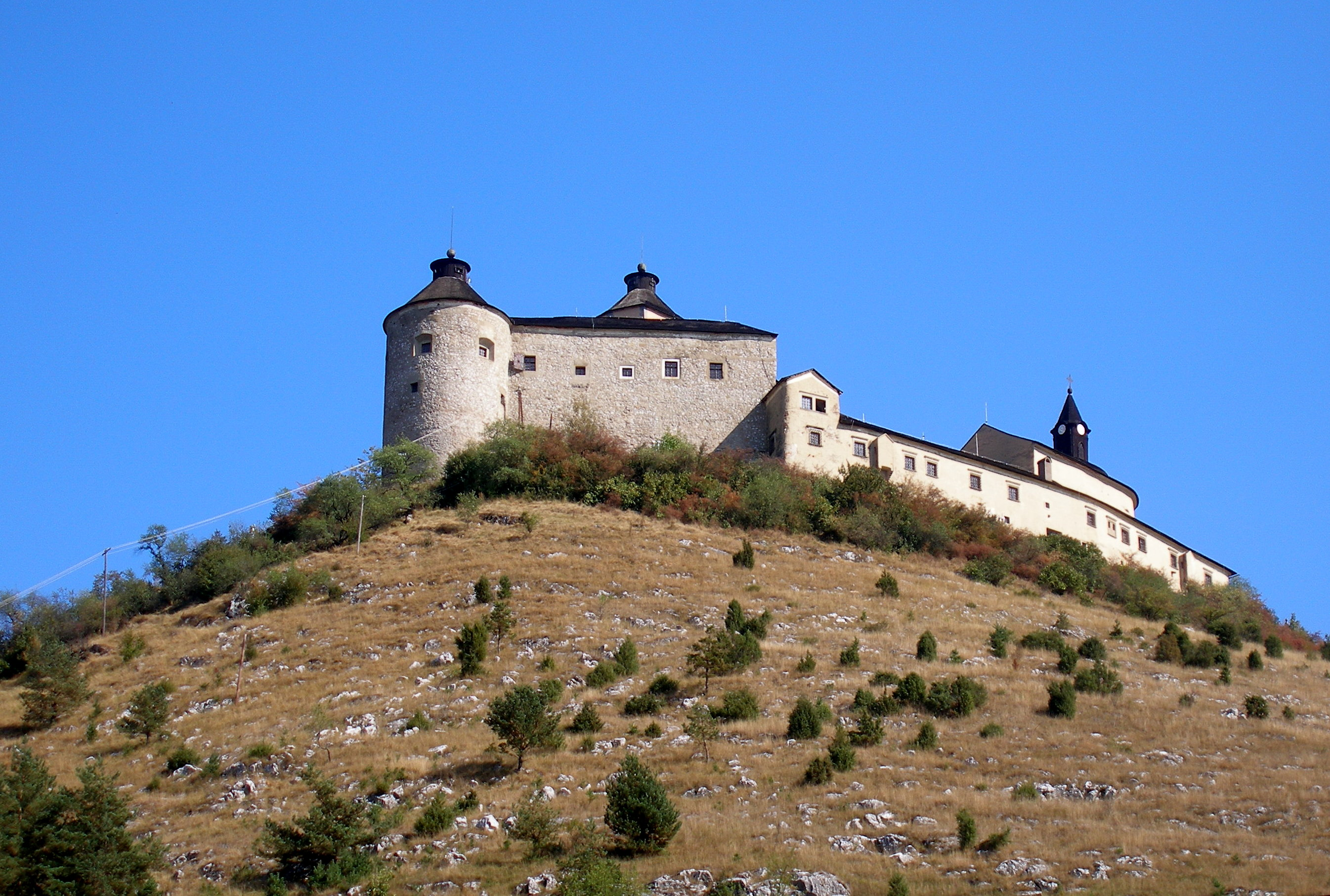
Castle Krásna Hôrka, which was founded by Bebek family

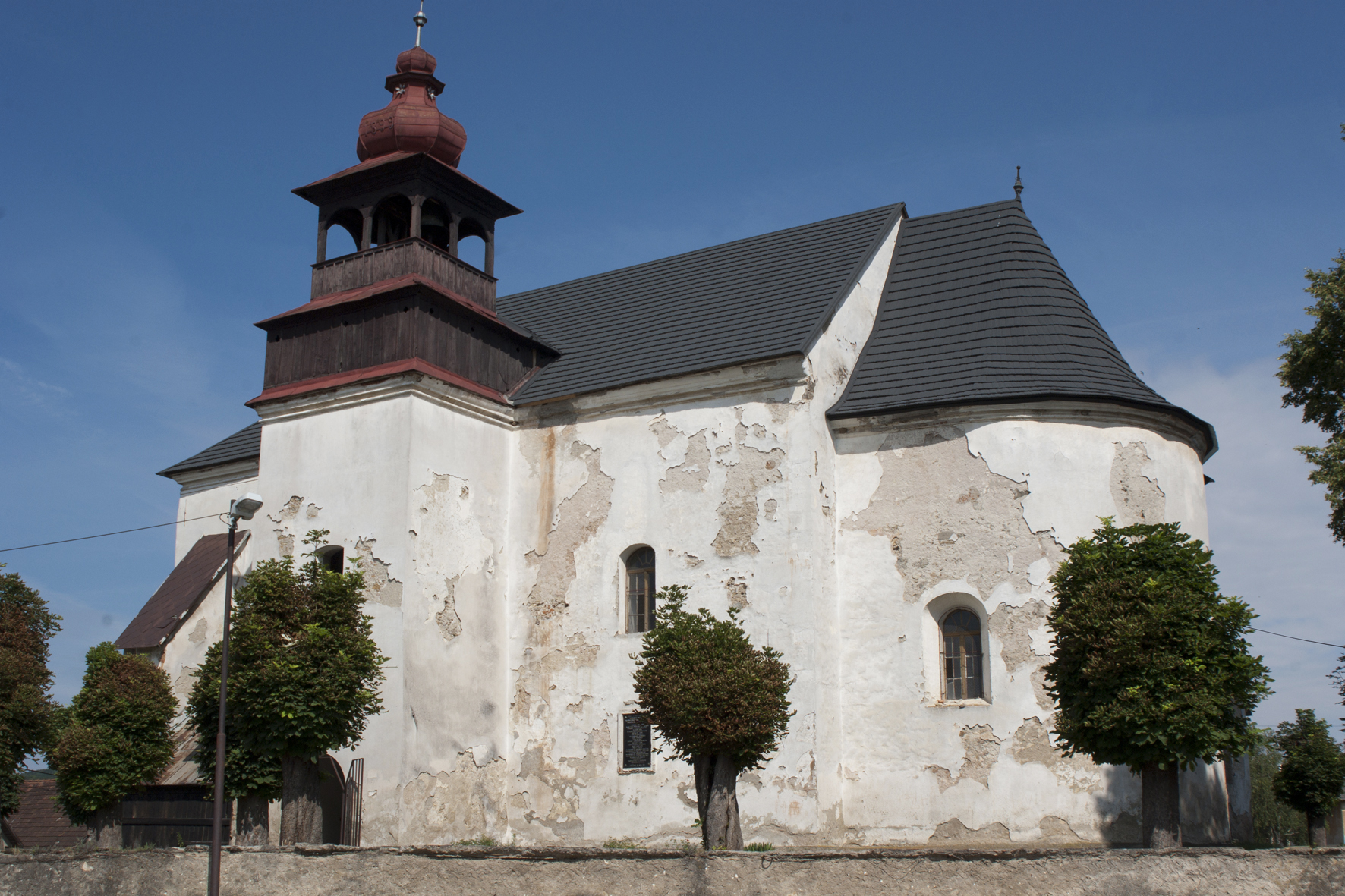
Large romanesque church in Kameňany

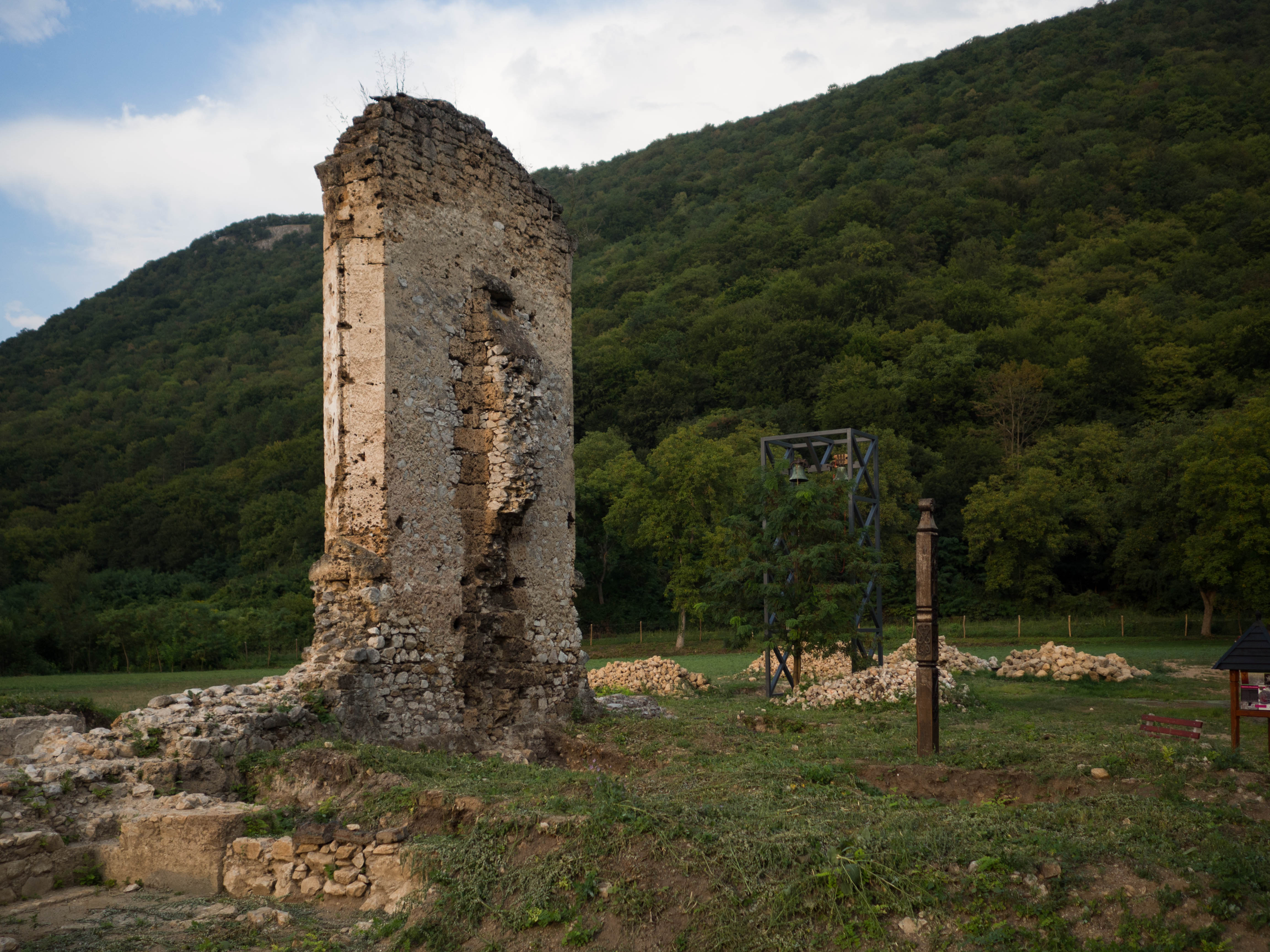
Bebeks were patrons of the monastery of the Order of Saint Paul the First Hermit in Gombasek

== Literature ==
- TIHÁNYOVÁ, Monika. Bubekovci z Plešivca. Úspechy a pády jedného rodu v politike a umení. O. Z. Georgius Bubek, 2017, 152 s., ISBN 978-80-972888-0-8.
- TIHÁNYOVÁ, Monika. Páni zo Štítnika. Putovanie kultúrnymi a hospodárskymi dejinami horného Gemera. O. Z. Georgius Bubek, 2020, 240 s.
