= Krásna Hôrka Castle =

Castle in Slovakia

- Krásna Hôrka
- Krásnohorské Podhradie, Slovakia
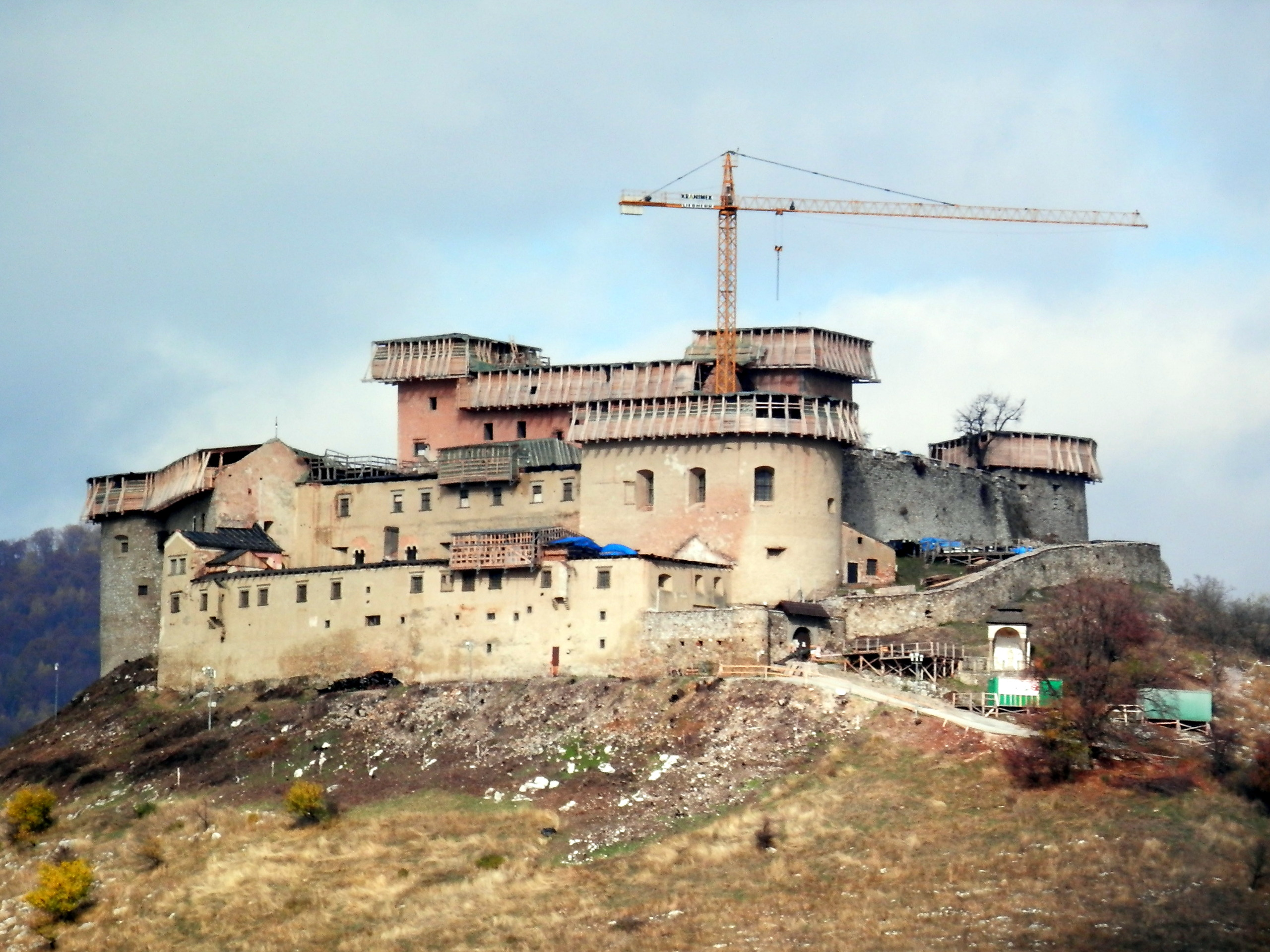
- Krásna Hôrka Castle, during the reconstruction works after 2012 fire (October 2013)

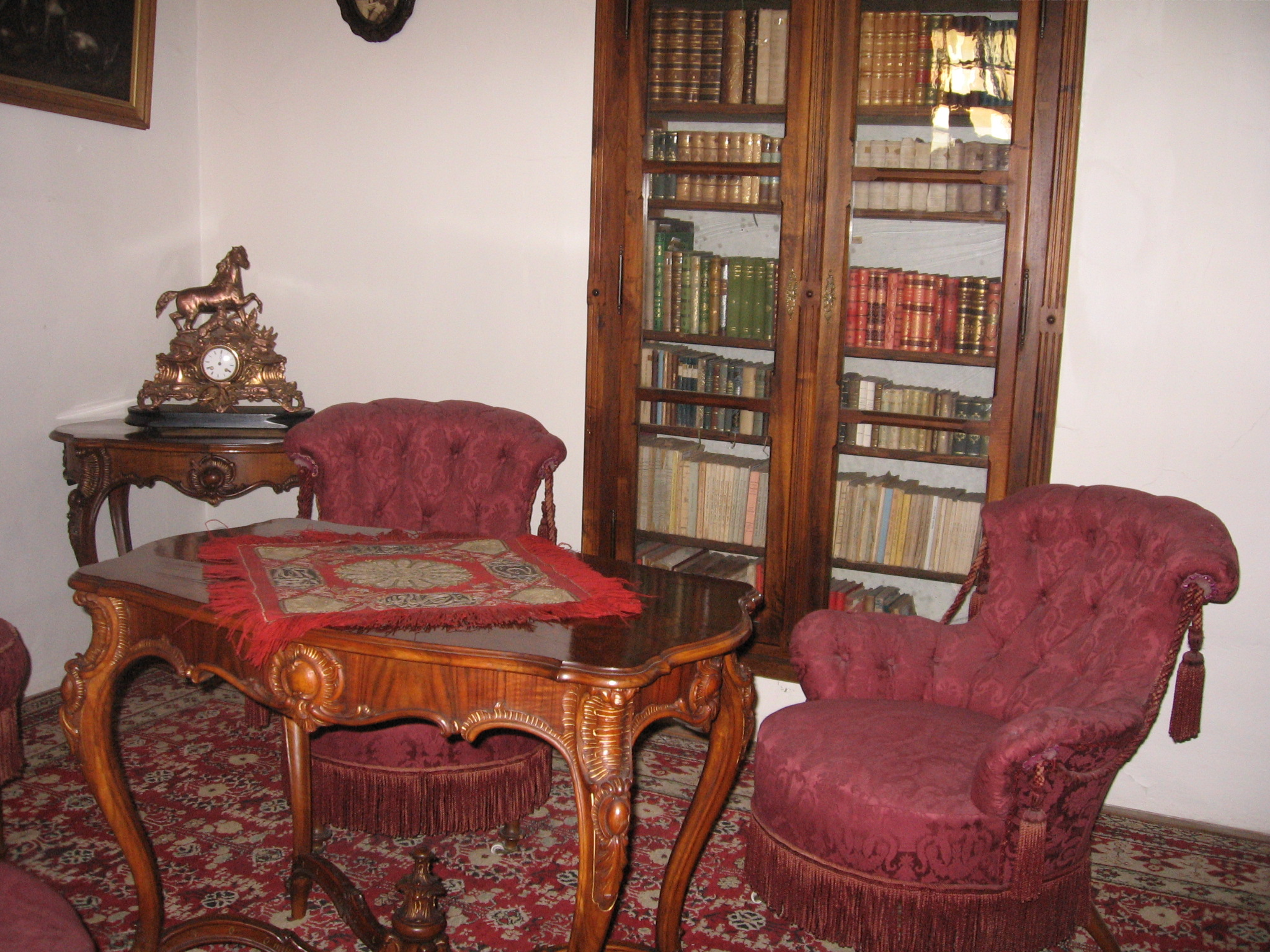
- Interior furniture

Location
- Location of Krásna Hôrka within Slovakia.
- Location within Slovakia
- Coordinates: 48.658307°N 20.600336°E

Site history
- Built: since the 13th century
- Events: 10 March 2012 – fire

The Krásna Hôrka Castle (Slovak: Hrad Krásna Hôrka, Hungarian: Krasznahorka vára) is a castle in Slovakia, built on a hilltop overlooking the village of Krásnohorské Podhradie near Rožňava, in Košice Region. The first recorded mention of the castle was in 1333. In 1961 Krásna Hôrka was designated a National Cultural Monument of the Slovak Republic. It was said to be one of the country's best-preserved castles. On 10 March 2012 the castle was extensively damaged by fire, due to some teens carelessly discarding a cigarette which set the grass on fire.

== Etymology ==
The name means "a beautiful mountain" (Slovak: krásna - beautiful, hôrka - a little mountain). Another explanation, unlikely but possible, is a derivation from the word kras (karst), because the karst is in the neighbourhood.

== History ==
The castle was built in the 13th century by the Hungarian Ákos brothers (Note: "Filip and Detre Szárs from the Ákos family") on a trade route leading from Transylvania through Košice to Spiš and today's Poland. The Ákos family (which later changed its name to Bebek) lived in Krásna Hôrka from the mid-13th century to 1566, apart from a short period when the Mariássy family seized control of the castle. In 1578, the castle passed into the hands of the Hungarian nobleman Péter Andrássy. It subsequently came into the possession of Kristóf Kubínyi, who acquired Krásna Hôrka Castle and its estate from the Royal Chamber for 25,000 forints around 1597. The castle later returned to the Andrássy family, in whose possession it remained until 1918 (the year the First Czechoslovak Republic was founded).

During 2010 and 2011 the castle underwent renovation and was re-opened to public in April, 2011.

== 2012 fire ==
On 10 March 2012, the castle was badly damaged by fire. The fire was caused by two boys who attempted to light up a cigarette and accidentally lit grass on the hill, from where it spread to the castle.

The castle building suffered extensive damage. The roof, the exhibition area in the Gothic palace and the bell tower were completely destroyed. Three bells in the bell tower were melted by the heat. Initially, it was thought that many of the building's historic artefacts had been destroyed. However, according to the Interior Minister of Slovakia Daniel Lipšic, "...the vast majority of exhibits remained undamaged". Daniel Krajcer, Minister of Culture, commented that only the upper part of the castle (including collections) had been destroyed. The Slovak National Museum has stated that 90% of the collections were undamaged.

== Cultural references ==
Hungarian folk ballad Krasznahorka büszke vára (The Proud Castle of Krásna Hôrka), traditionally played on a tárogató, is inspired by the castle.

== Gallery ==
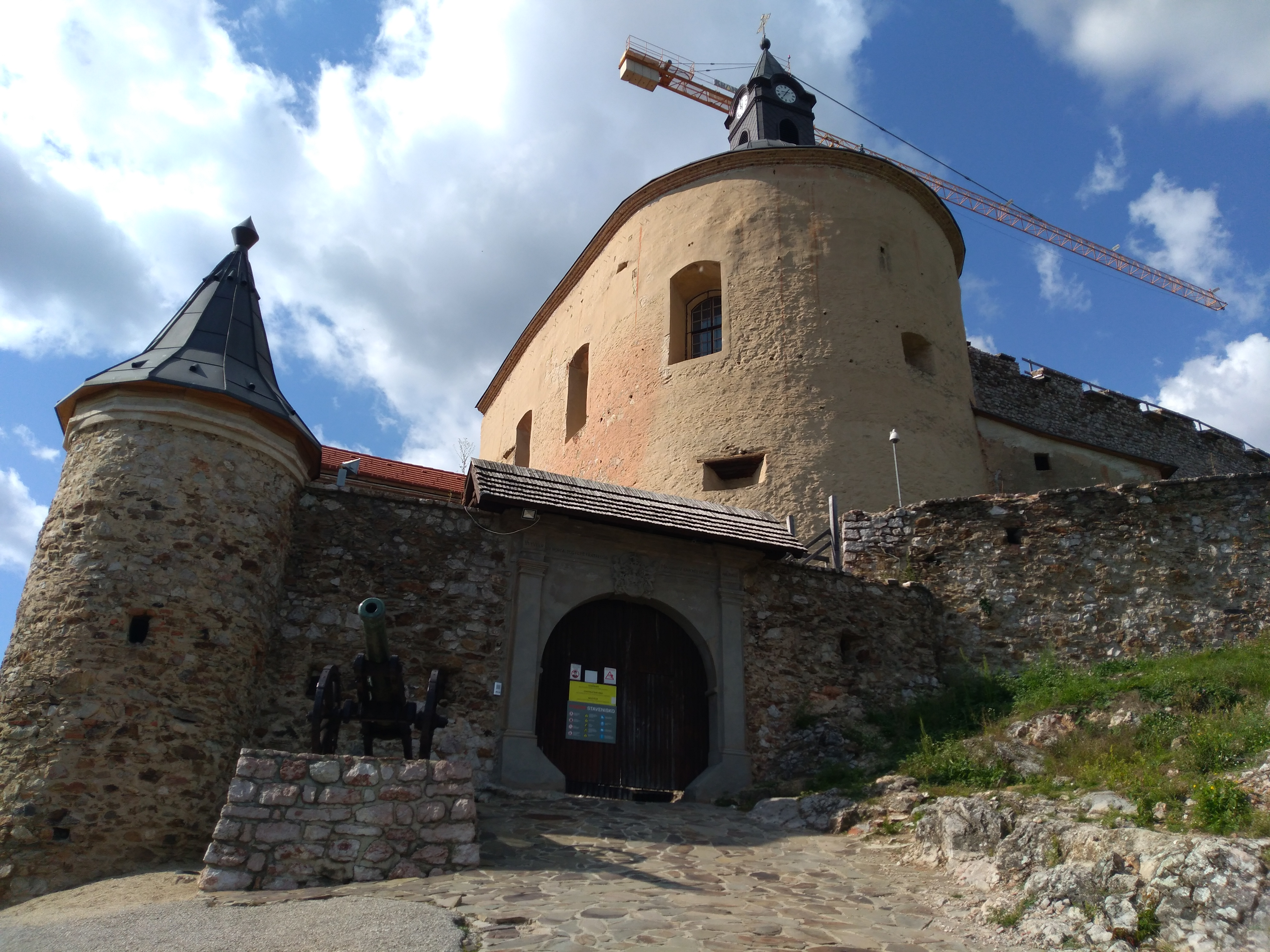

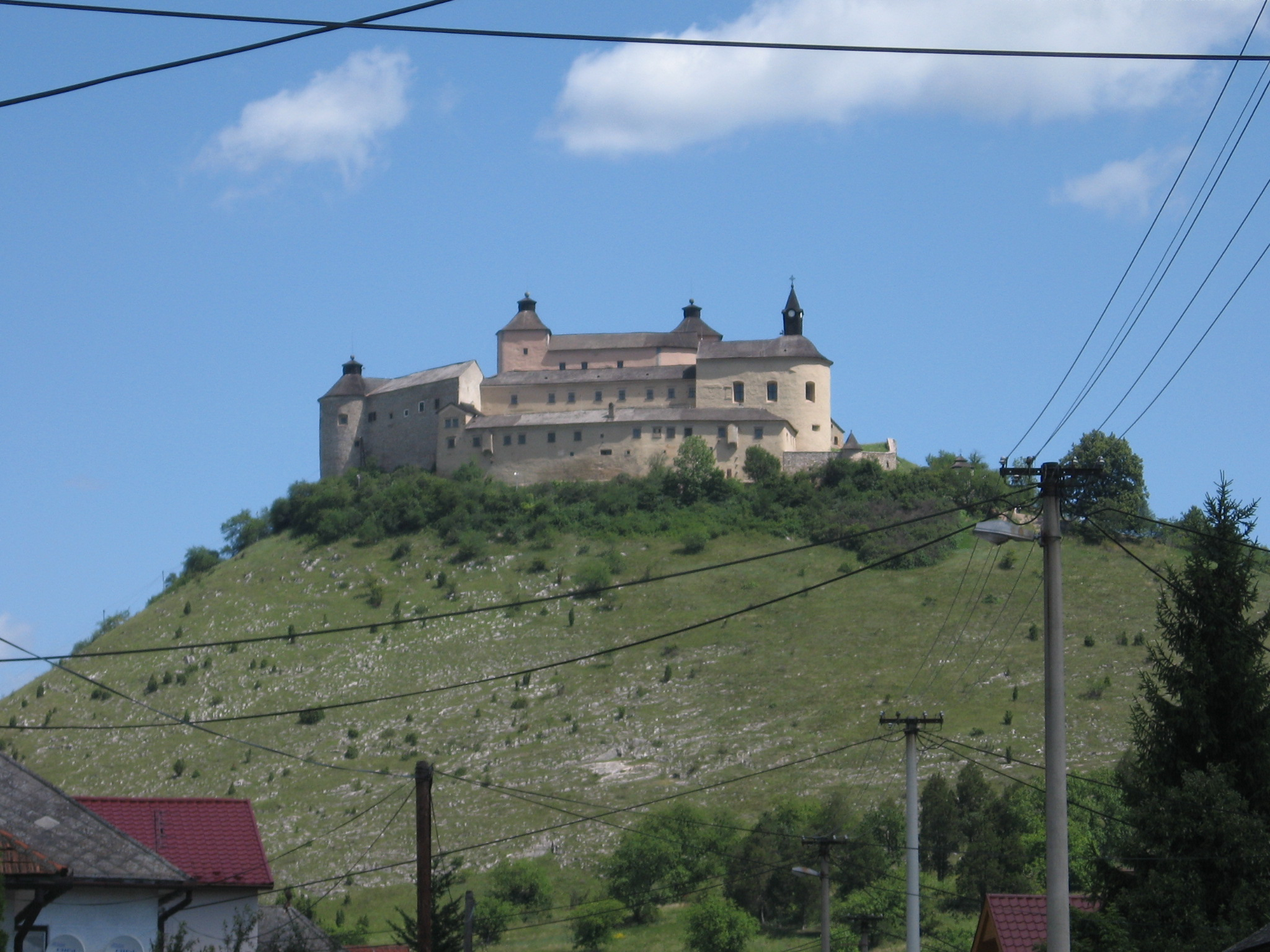

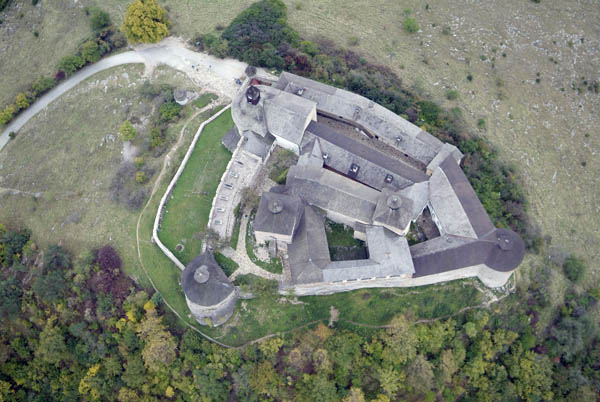

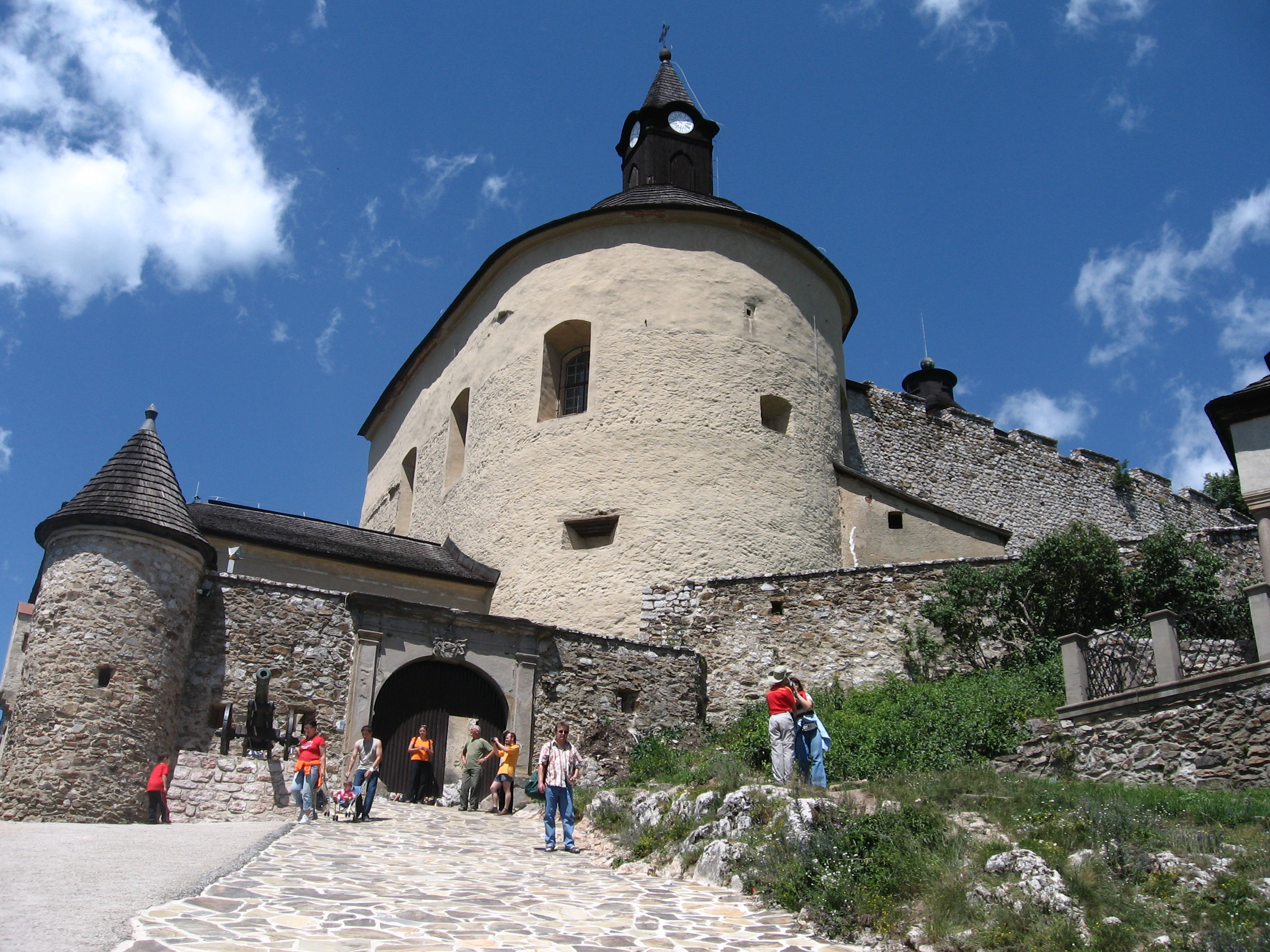

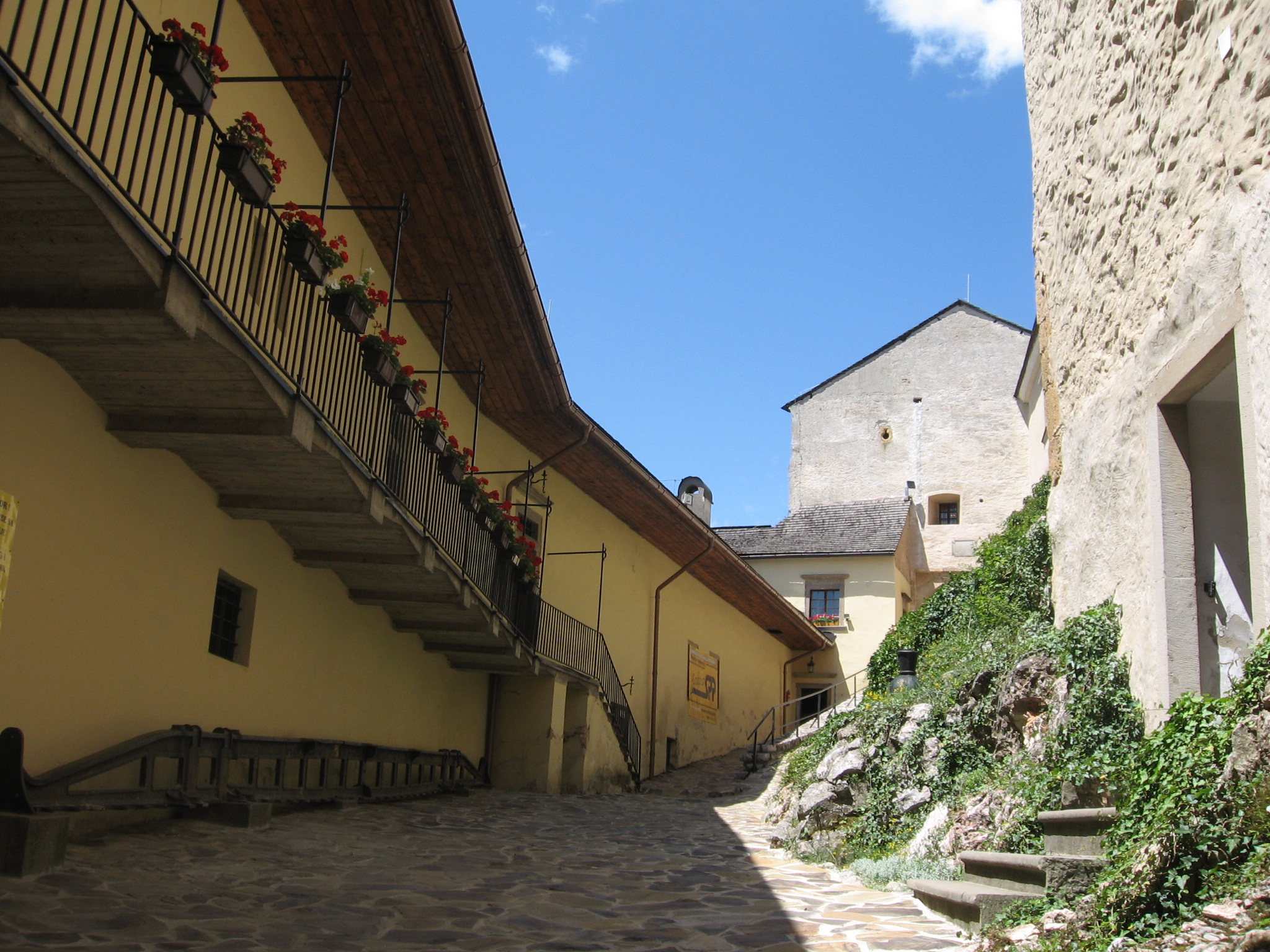

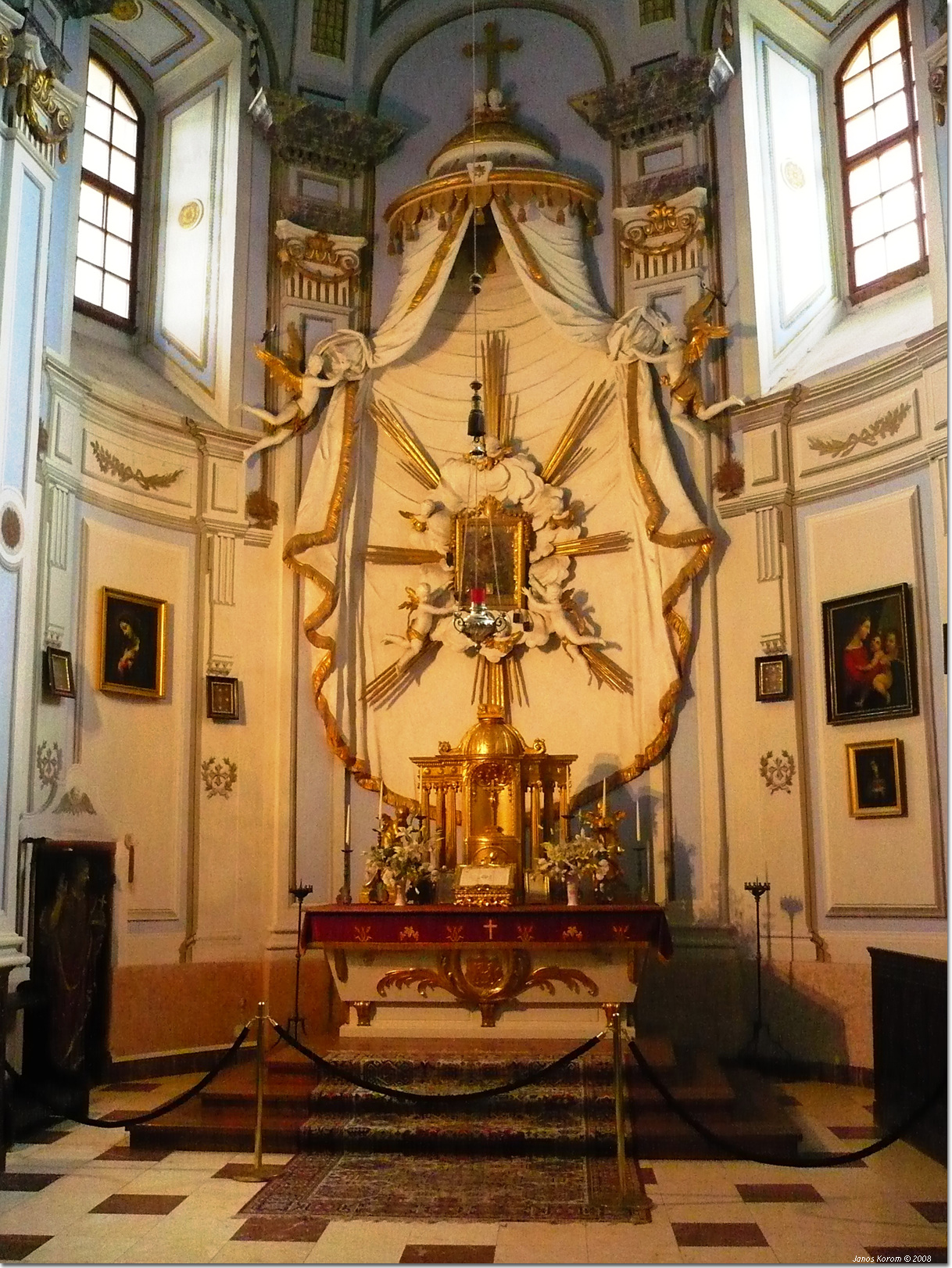

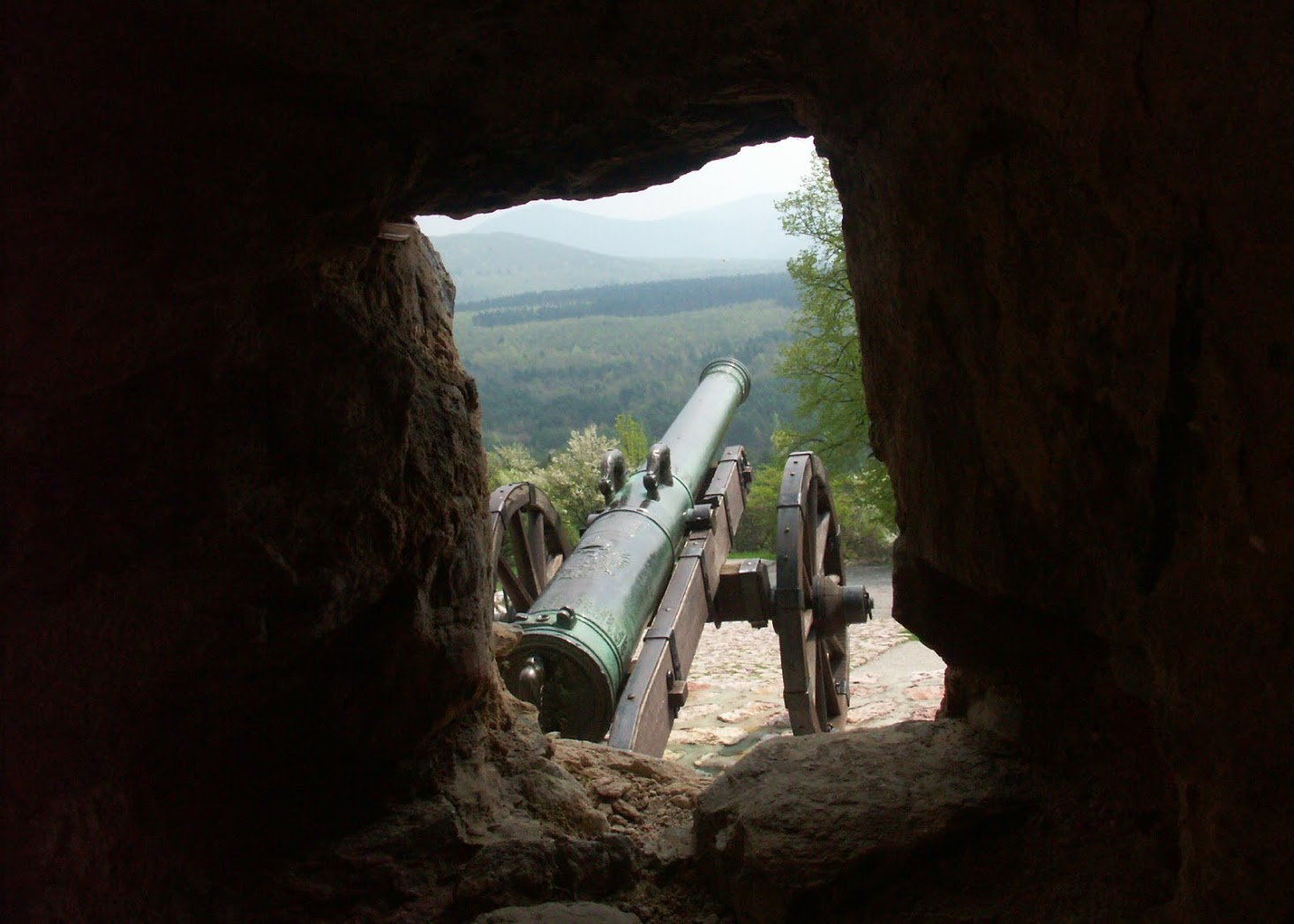

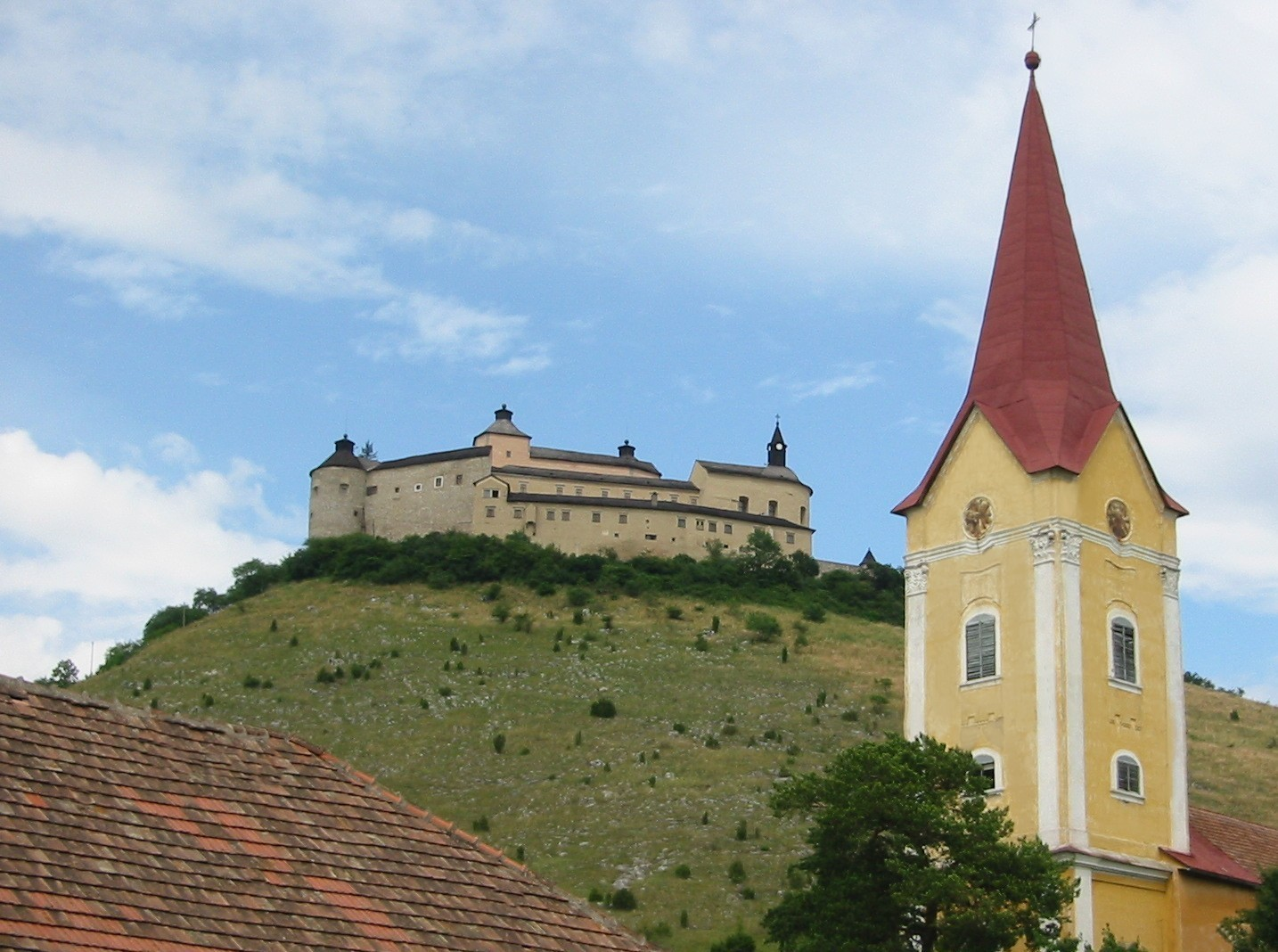

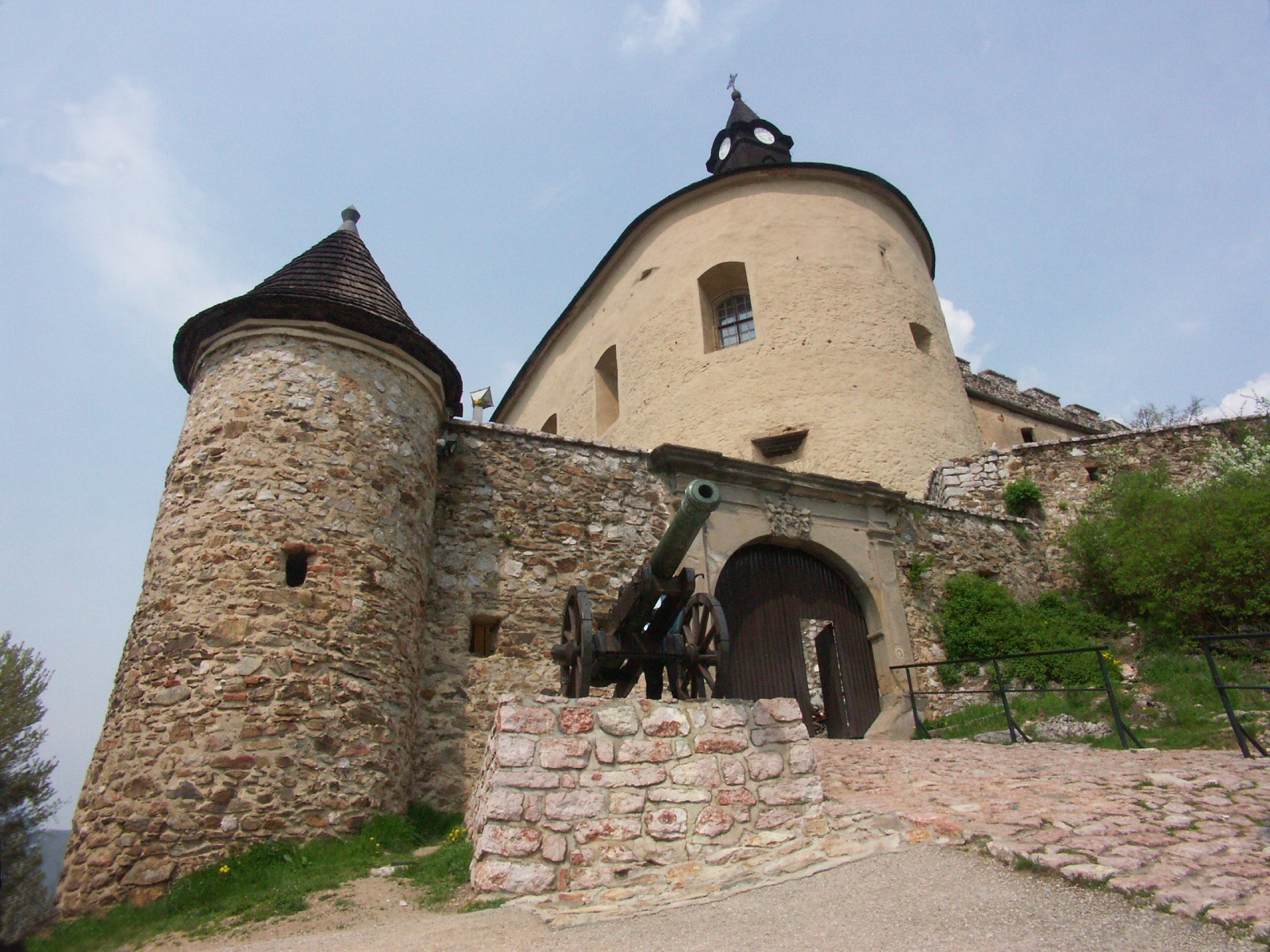

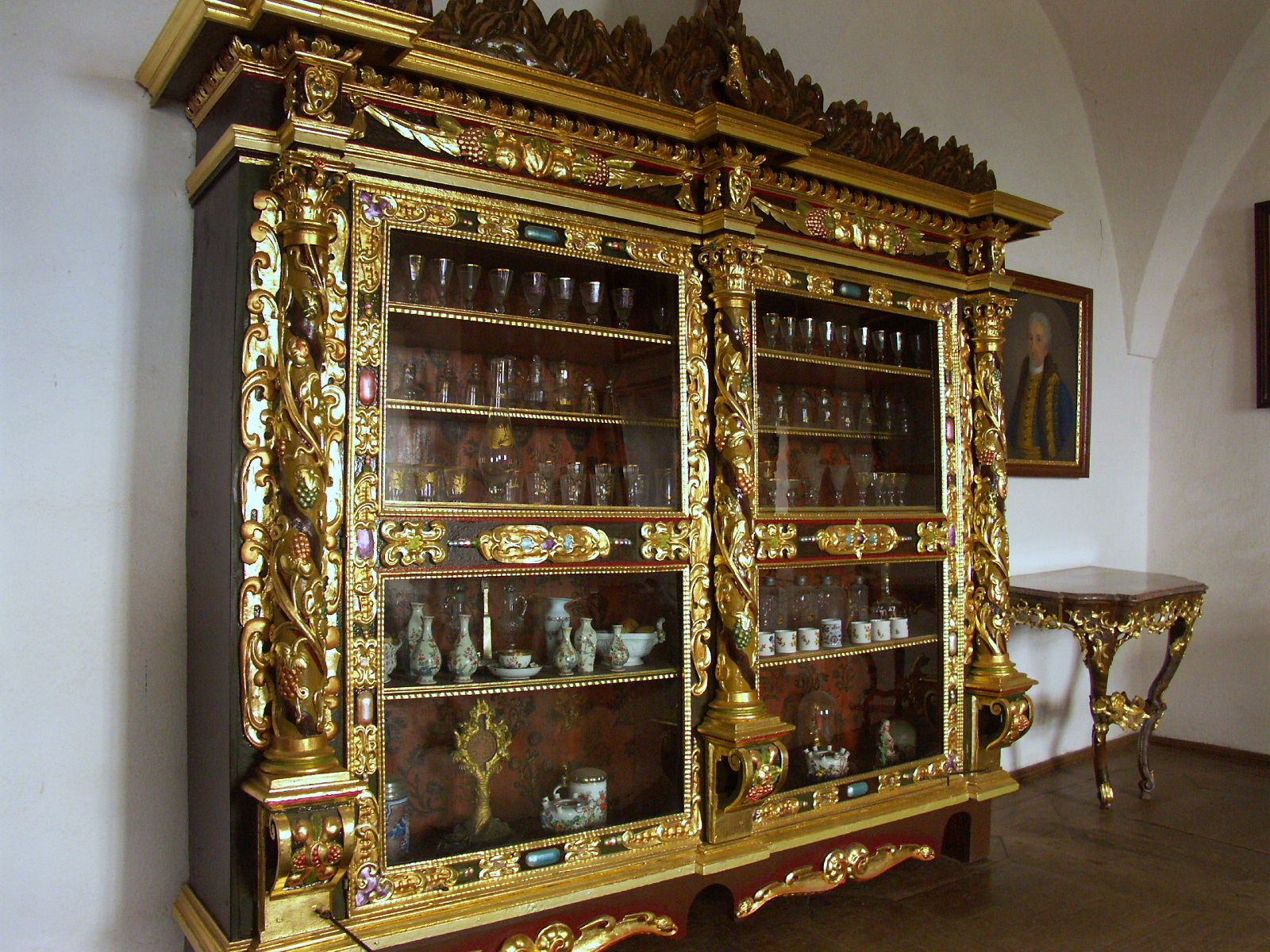

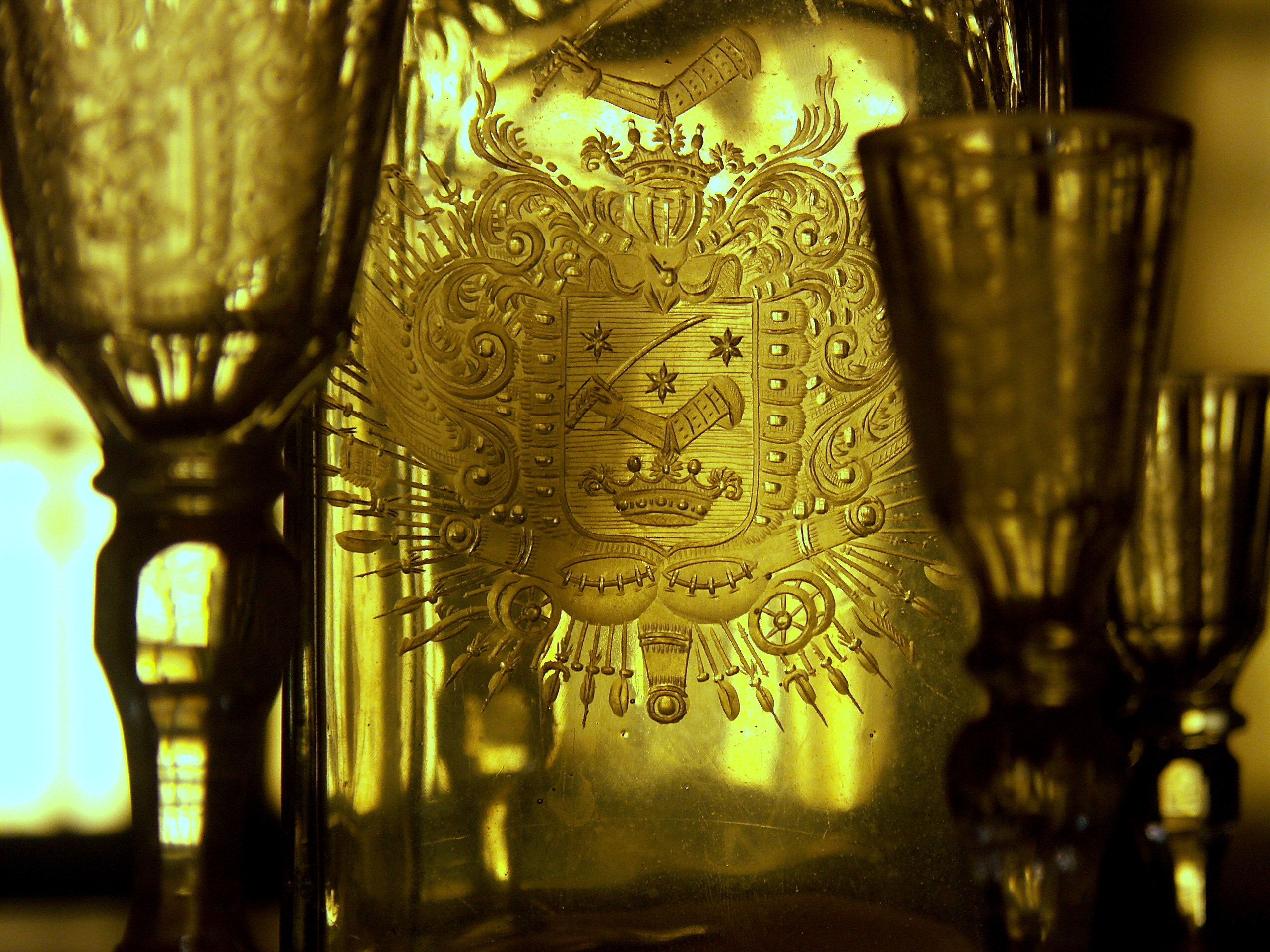

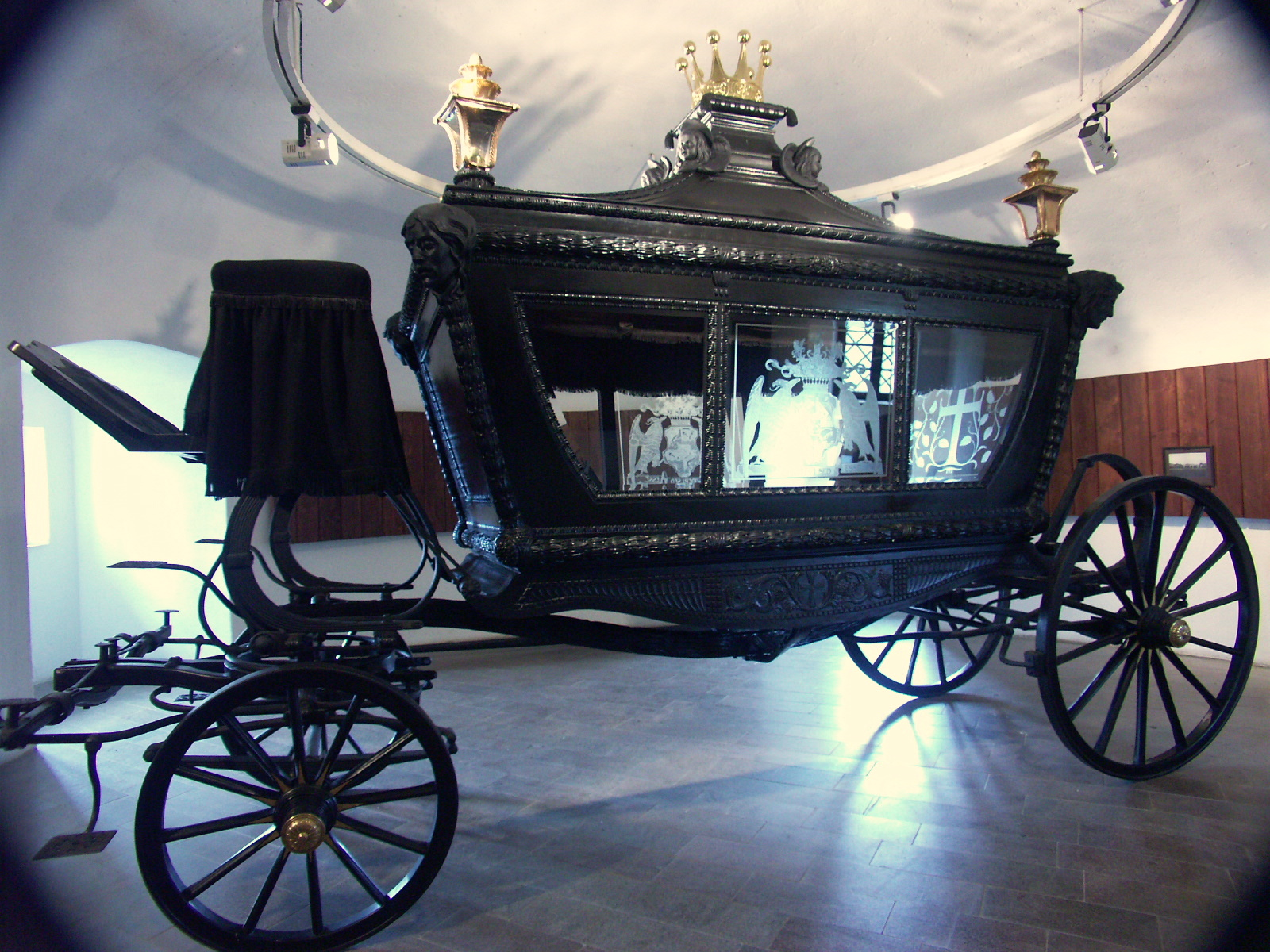

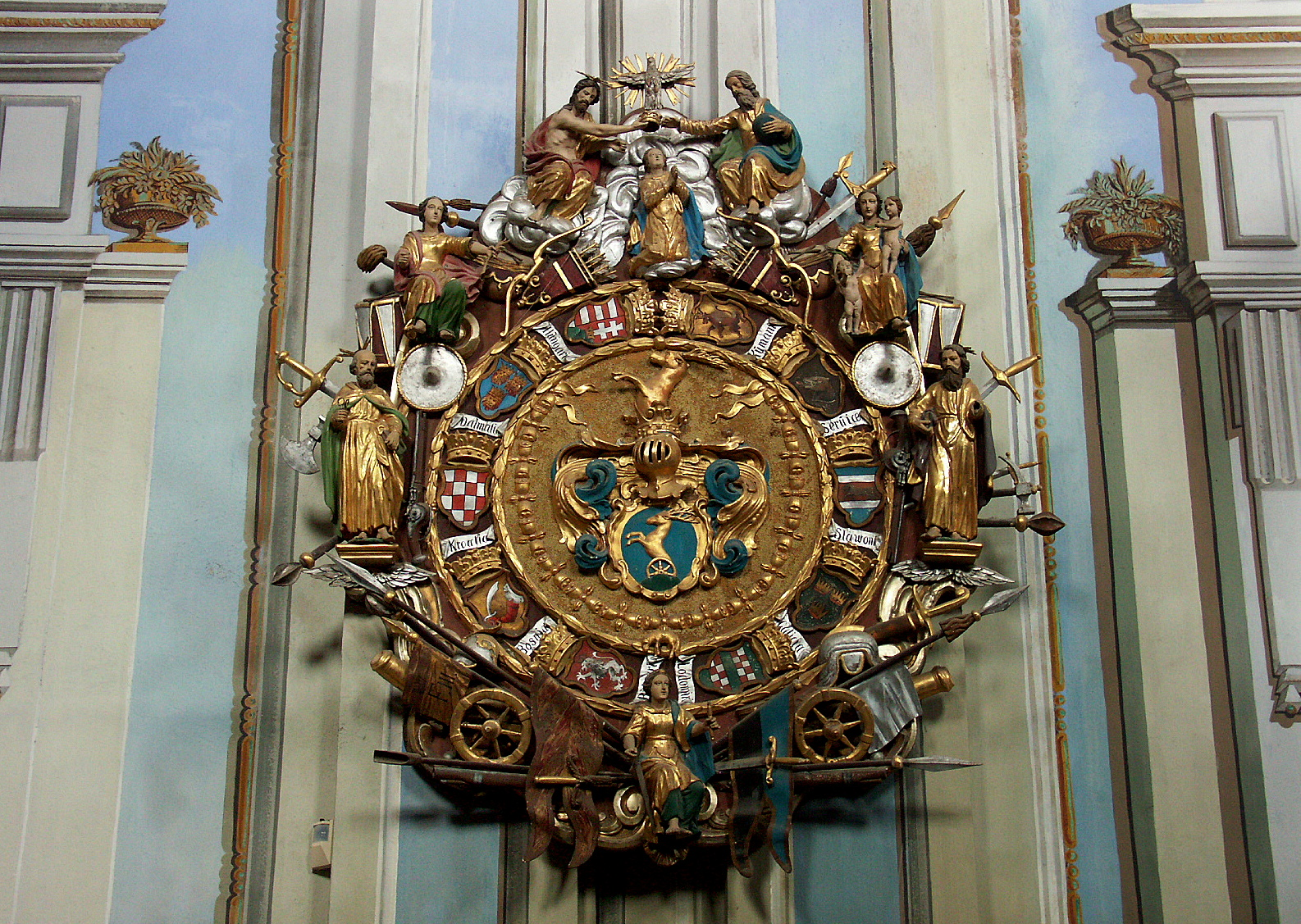
