= Plešivec, Slovakia =

Plešivec Pelsőc
- Municipality
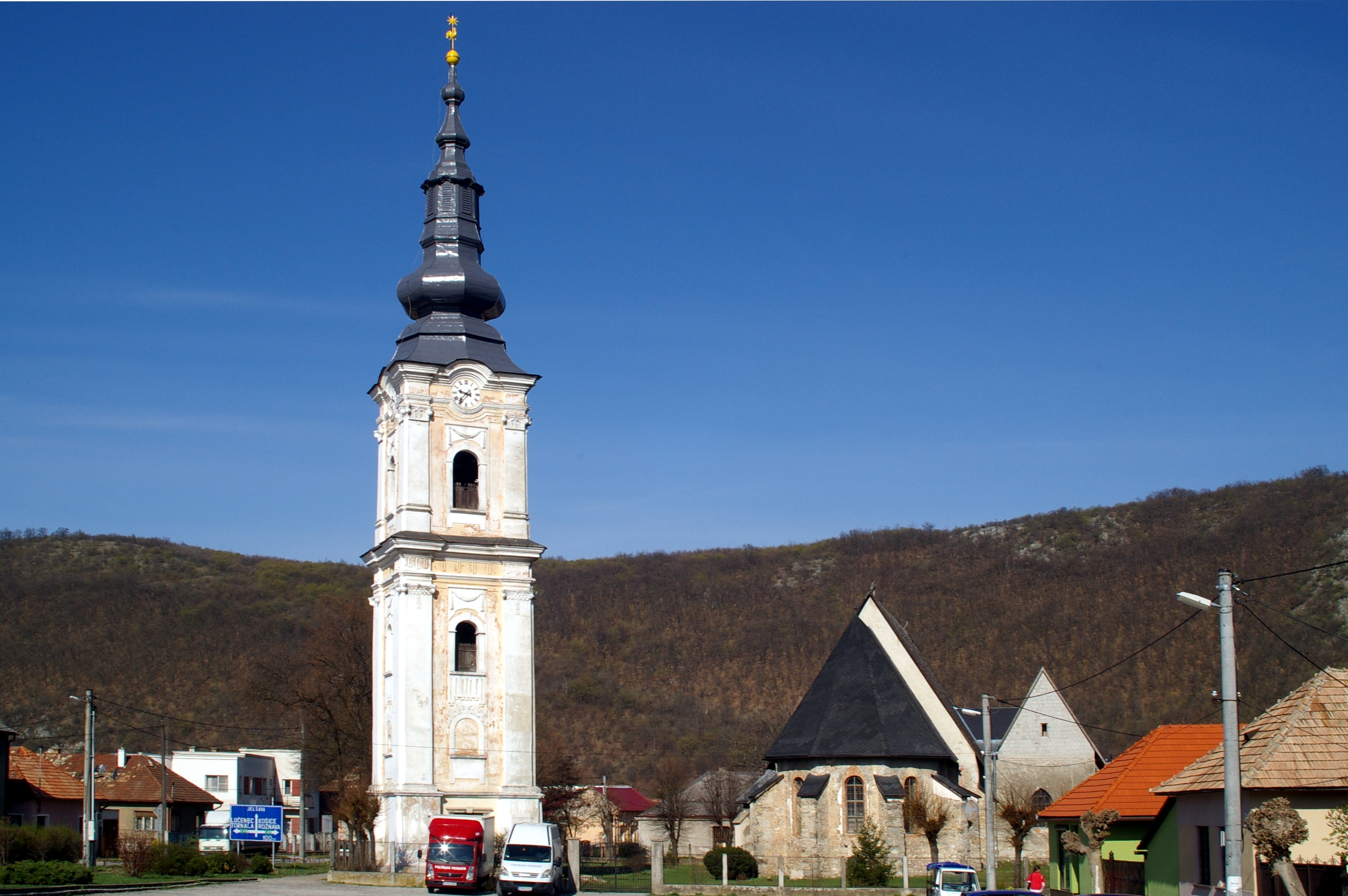
- Church in the main square of Plešivec

- Flag Coat of arms

- Location of Plešivec in the Košice Region Location of Plešivec in Slovakia
- Coordinates: 48.55°N 20.40°E
- Country: Slovakia
- Region: Košice Region
- District: Rožňava District
- First mentioned: 1243

Government
  - Mayor: Gabriel Gergely

Area
  - Total: 62.14 km^{2} (23.99 sq mi)
- Elevation: 216 m (709 ft)

Population (2025)
  - Total: 2,138
- Time zone: UTC+1 (CET)
  - Summer (DST): UTC+2 (CEST)
- Postal code: 491 1
- Area code: +421 58
- Vehicle registration plate (until 2022): RV
- Website: www.obecplesivec.sk

Plešivec (Hungarian: Pelsőc, German: Pleissnitz) is a large village and municipality in the Rožňava District in the Košice Region of middle-eastern Slovakia.

== History ==
In historical records the village was first mentioned in 1243. Before the establishment of independent Czechoslovakia in 1918, Plešivec was part of Gömör and Kishont County within the Kingdom of Hungary. From 1938 to 1945, it was again part of Hungary as a result of the First Vienna Award.

== Geography ==
The municipality lies at an altitude of 216 metres (709 ft) and covers an area of 62.14 km^{2} (23.99 sq mi) (2025).

== Population ==
Population statistic (10 years)
Year	1995	2005	2015	2025
Count	2361	2454	2311	2138
Difference		+3.93%	−5.82%	−7.48%

Population statistic
Year	2024	2025
Count	2160	2138
Difference		−1.01%

It has a population of 2138 people (31 December 2025).

=== Ethnicity ===
Census 2021 (1+ %)
Ethnicity	Number	Fraction
Slovak	1227	55.14%
Hungarian	930	41.79%
Not found out	224	10.06%
Romani	66	2.96%
Total	2225	

In year 2021 was 2225 people by ethnicity 1227 as Slovak, 930 as Hungarian, 224 as Not found out, 66 as Romani, 17 as Czech, 5 as German, 5 as Other, 4 as Ukrainian, 2 as Vietnamese, 2 as Polish, 1 as Jewish, 1 as Irish, 1 as Italian, 1 as Rusyn, 1 as Russian, 1 as Romanian, 1 as Austrian and 1 as English.

Note on population: The difference values of population numbers in the table "Population statistic" and in the sections "Ethnicity" & "Religion" is caused by the use of various statistical methods.

=== Religion ===
Census 2021 (1+ %)
Religion	Number	Fraction
None	952	42.79%
Roman Catholic Church	451	20.27%
Calvinist Church	336	15.1%
Not found out	231	10.38%
Evangelical Church	133	5.98%
Jehovah's Witnesses	55	2.47%
Greek Catholic Church	27	1.21%
Total	2225	

In year 2021 was 2225 people by religion 952 from None, 451 from Roman Catholic Church, 336 from Calvinist Church, 231 from Not found out, 133 from Evangelical Church, 55 from Jehovah's Witnesses, 27 from Greek Catholic Church, 9 from Other, 8 from United Methodist Church, 5 from Other and not ascertained christian church, 5 from Christian Congregations in Slovakia, 5 from Buddhism, 4 from Old Catholic Church, 1 from Eastern Orthodox Church, 1 from Hinduism, 1 from Apostolic Church and 1 from Ad hoc movements.

== Economy and facilities ==
The village has a petrol station and a guesthouse. It also has a number of quality medical facilities including a pharmacy, a doctors surgery and outpatient facilities for children and adolescents. The village also has a commercial bank, an insurance company and a cashomat.

== Government ==
The village has its own birth registry office and its own police force

== Culture ==
The village has a public library, a gymnasium and a football pitch.

== Transport ==
The village has its own railway station.
