= Kameňany =

Kameňany Kövi
- Municipality
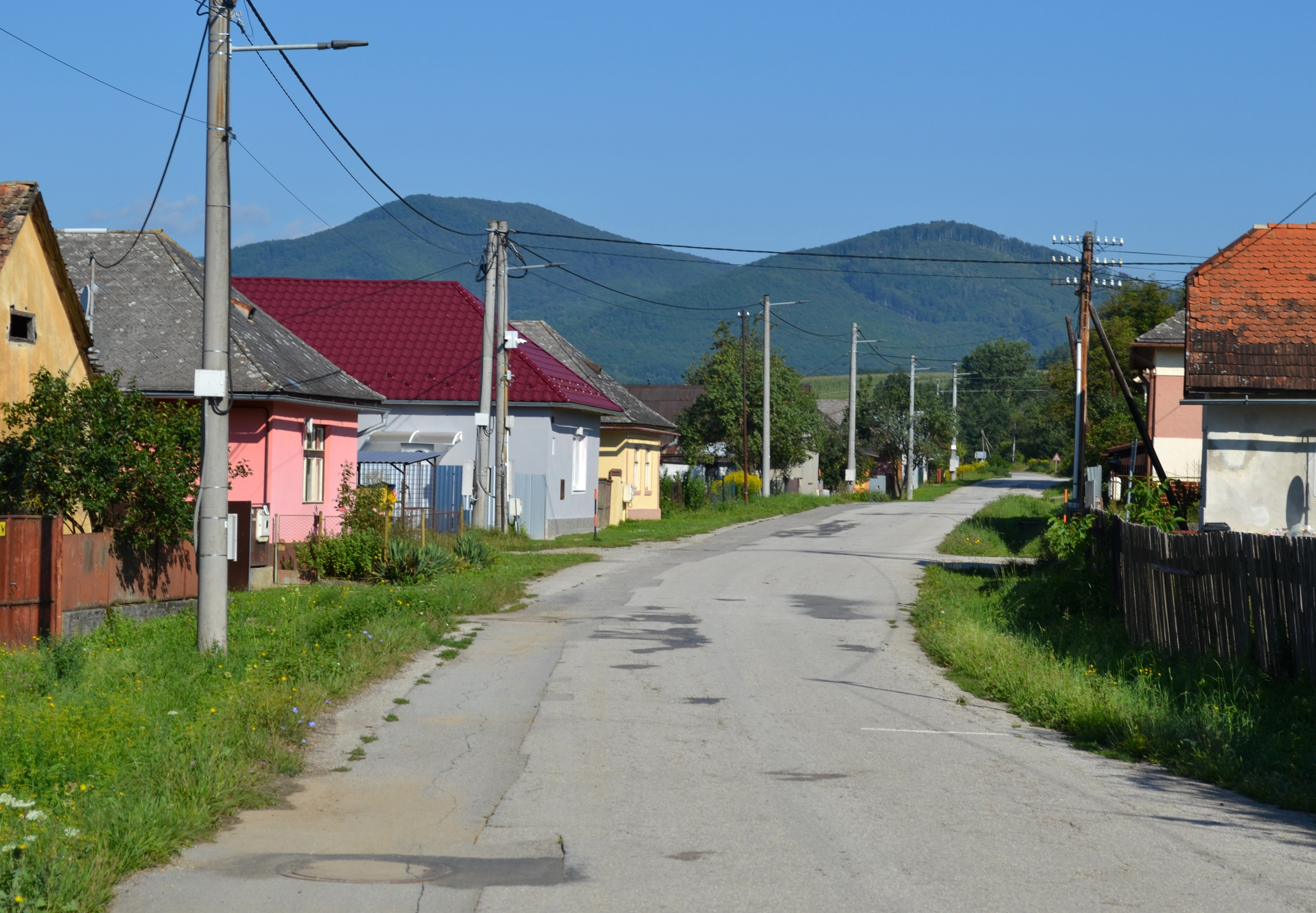

- Flag

- Location of Kameňany in the Banská Bystrica Region Location of Kameňany in Slovakia
- Coordinates: 48.58°N 20.20°E
- Country: Slovakia
- Region: Banská Bystrica Region
- District: Revúca District
- First mentioned: 1243

Area
  - Total: 31.34 km^{2} (12.10 sq mi)
- Elevation: 246 m (807 ft)

Population (2025)
  - Total: 852
- Time zone: UTC+1 (CET)
  - Summer (DST): UTC+2 (CEST)
- Postal code: 496 2
- Area code: +421 58
- Vehicle registration plate (until 2022): RA

Kameňany (Hungarian: Kövi) is a village and municipality in Revúca District in the Banská Bystrica Region of Slovakia.

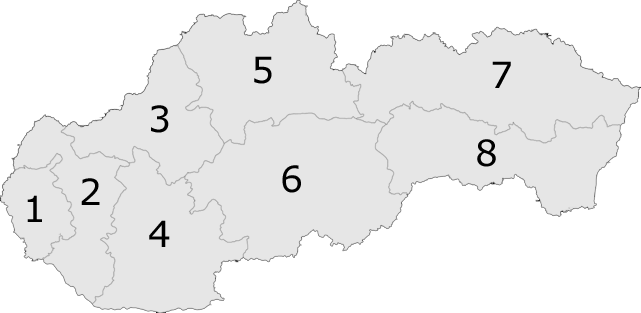
6: Banská Bystrica Region

== Geography ==
The municipality lies at an altitude of 246 metres (807 ft) and covers an area of 31.34 km^{2} (12.10 sq mi) (2025).

== Population ==
Population statistic (10 years)
Year	1995	2005	2015	2025
Count	643	713	870	852
Difference		+10.88%	+22.01%	−2.06%

Population statistic
Year	2024	2025
Count	851	852
Difference		+0.11%

It has a population of 852 people (31 December 2025).

=== Ethnicity ===
Census 2021 (1+ %)
Ethnicity	Number	Fraction
Slovak	788	93.58%
Romani	53	6.29%
Not found out	30	3.56%
Czech	24	2.85%
Total	842	

In year 2021 was 842 people by ethnicity 788 as Slovak, 53 as Romani, 30 as Not found out, 24 as Czech, 6 as Hungarian, 1 as Polish and 1 as Moravian.

Note on population: The difference values of population numbers in the table "Population statistic" and in the sections "Ethnicity" & "Religion" is caused by the use of various statistical methods.

The vast majority of the municipality's population consists of the local Roma community. In 2019, they constituted an estimated 90% of the local population.

=== Religion ===
Census 2021 (1+ %)
Religion	Number	Fraction
None	389	46.2%
Evangelical Church	279	33.14%
Roman Catholic Church	137	16.27%
Not found out	29	3.44%
Total	842	

In year 2021 was 842 people by religion 389 from None, 279 from Evangelical Church, 137 from Roman Catholic Church, 29 from Not found out, 4 from Greek Catholic Church, 2 from Old Catholic Church, 1 from Paganism and natural spirituality and 1 from United Methodist Church.

== Genealogical resources ==
The records for genealogical research are available at the state archive "Statny Archiv in Kosice, Slovakia"

- Roman Catholic church records (births/marriages/deaths): 1731-1900 (parish B)
- Lutheran church records (births/marriages/deaths): 1758-1895 (parish A)

== See also ==
- List of municipalities and towns in Slovakia
