= Silica, Rožňava District =

Silica Szilice
- Municipality
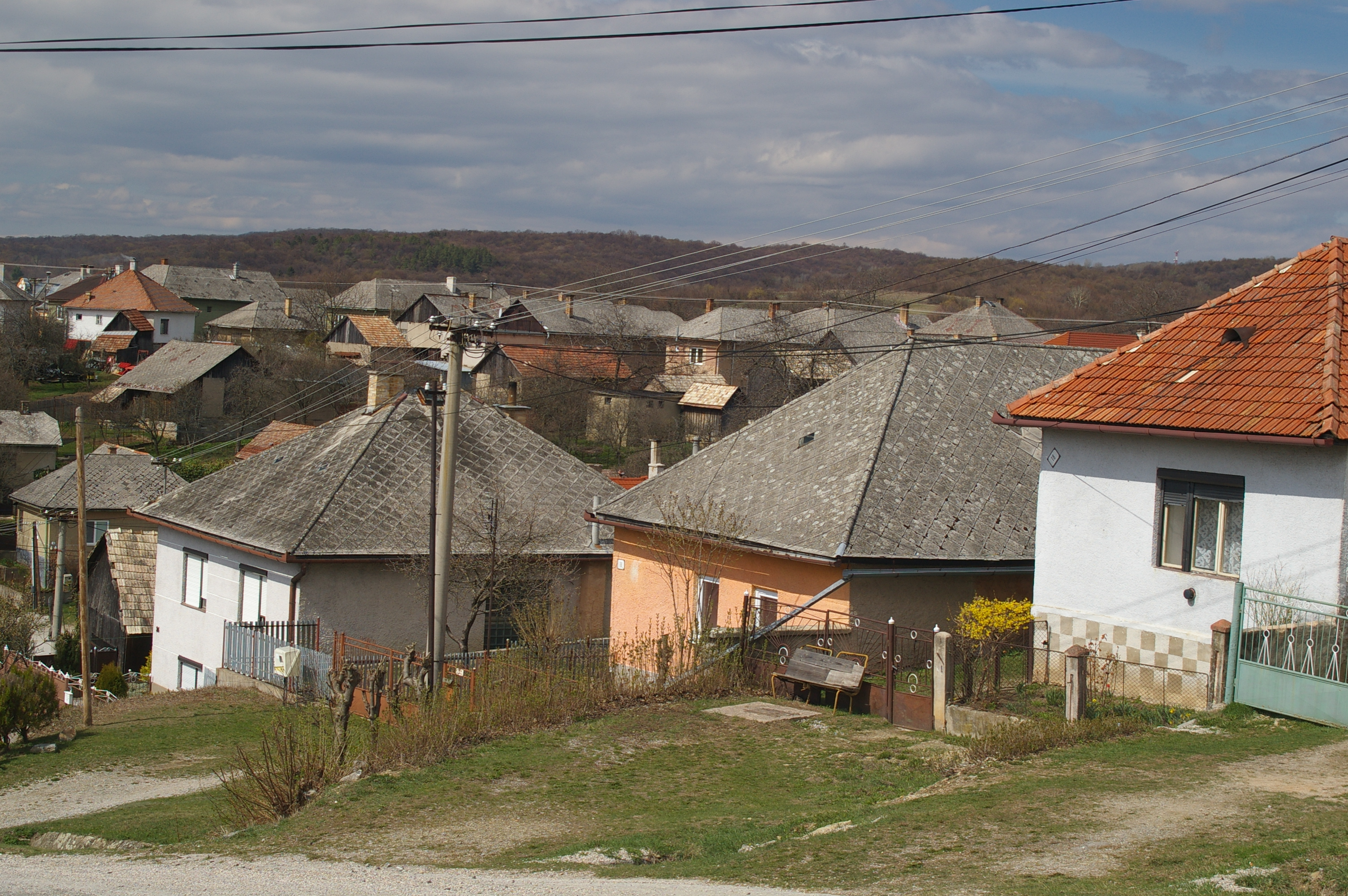

- Flag

- Location of Silica in the Košice Region Location of Silica in Slovakia
- Coordinates: 48.55°N 20.53°E
- Country: Slovakia
- Region: Košice Region
- District: Rožňava District
- First mentioned: 1399

Area
  - Total: 34.56 km^{2} (13.34 sq mi)
- Elevation: 546 m (1,791 ft)

Population (2025)
  - Total: 517
- Time zone: UTC+1 (CET)
  - Summer (DST): UTC+2 (CEST)
- Postal code: 495 2
- Area code: +421 58
- Vehicle registration plate (until 2022): RV
- Website: www.obecsilica.sk

Silica (Hungarian: Szilice) is a village and municipality in the Rožňava District in the Košice Region of middle-eastern Slovakia.

== History ==
In historical records the village was first mentioned in 1399. Before the establishment of independent Czechoslovakia in 1918, Silica was part of Gömör and Kishont County within the Kingdom of Hungary. The locality was annexed by the Kingdom of Hungary after the arbitration of Vienna on 2 November 1938. In 1938, there were 954 inhabitants, of which 4 were of Jewish origin. It was part of the district of Rožňava. The name of the locality before World War II was Silica/Szilice. From 1938 to 1945, the Hungarian name Szilice was used. After the liberation, the municipality was reinstated in the reconstituted Czechoslovak Republic.

== Geography ==
The municipality lies at an altitude of 546 metres (1,791 ft) and covers an area of 34.58 km^{2} (13.35 sq mi) (2024).

== Demographics ==
=== Population ===
Population statistic (10 years)
Year	1994	2004	2014	2024
Count	638	582	553	519
Difference		−8.77%	−4.98%	−6.14%

Population statistic
Year	2023	2024
Count	527	519
Difference		−1.51%

=== Ethnicity ===
Census data (2021)
Ethnicity	Number	Percentage
Hungarian	431	79.52%
Slovak	129	23.8%
Not found out	33	6.08%
Romani	9	1.66%
Total	542	

=== Religion ===
Census data (2021)
Religion	Number	Percentage
Calvinist Church	240	44.28%
Roman Catholic Church	121	22.32%
None	114	21.03%
Evangelical Church	21	3.87%
Not found out	19	3.51%
Greek Catholic Church	15	2.77%
Jehovah's Witnesses	7	1.29%
Total	542	

== Culture ==
The village has a public library and a football pitch.
