= Reformed Christian Church in Slovakia =

The Reformed Christian Church in Slovakia (Slovak: Reformovaná kresťanská cirkev na Slovensku, Hungarian: Szlovákiai Református Keresztény Egyház) has 85,000 members in 205 parishes and 103 mission churches and 59 house fellowships in 9 presbyteries. The members are mostly Hungarians living in the southern part of the country, and it has a shared history with the Reformed Church in Hungary. The bishop is the head of the church, in contrast with other Calvinist churches.

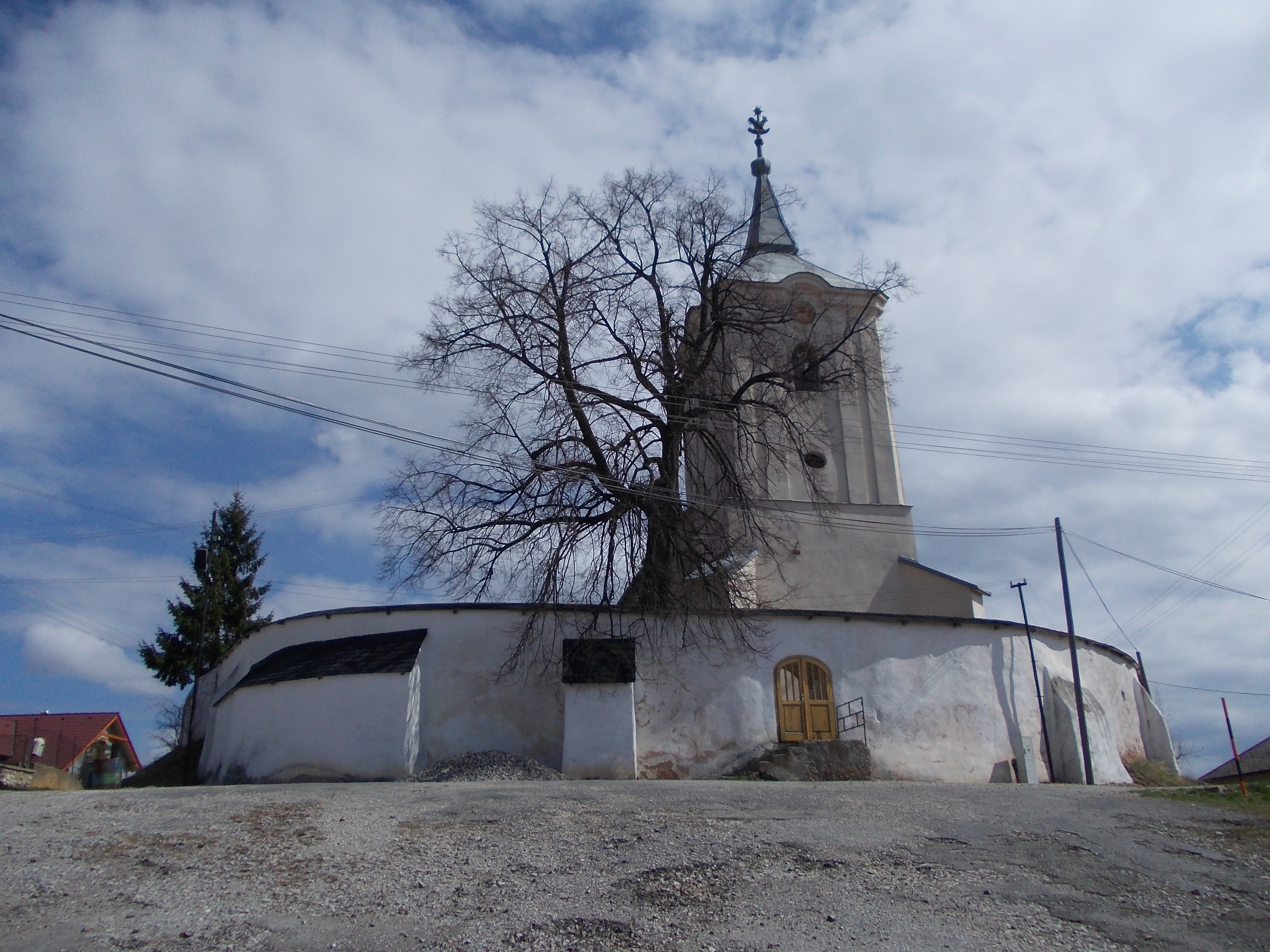
Reformed church in Silica

== History ==
Before World War I, these congregations were part of the Reformed Church in Hungary. The Reformation reached this part of the country in 1520s, first Lutheranism dominated then later Calvinism did. In 1567, four presbyteries were formed in Eastern Slovakia. In the Synod of Debrecen the Second Helvetic Confession was adopted. During the Counter Reformation, the princes of Transylvania protected the Calvinist faith and extended their supremacy to this part of Hungary.

After World War II, the church adopted its constitution. In 1925, a theological seminary was founded in Lučenec. In 1950s the denomination adopted a constitution.

After the collapse of communism, the church adopted a new constitution. It runs five primary schools, two secondary schools and one kindergarten.

== Doctrine ==
- Heidelberg Catechism
- Second Helvetic Confession

== Demographics ==
The church had 85,000 members and 204 parishes and 103 congregations and 54 mission churches in 2021 a decrease of 25,000 since 2011, mostly in southern Slovakia among Hungarians.

In 2011, the Church had about 110,000 members. Out of this number Hungarian speaking members were about 95,000–100,000, the church has 225 active pastors, 200 are Hungarian speaking.

There are 9 presbyteries in the denomination, the Pozsonyi, Komáromi, Barsi, Gömöri, Abaújtornai, Zempléni, Ungi, Michalovský (Nagymihályi), Ondavsko-Hornádský (Ondava-Hernádi) Presbyteries, and there are several mission congregations, like the Hungarian Reformed Church in Prague.

== Interchurch relations ==
The Reformed Christian Church in Slovakia is a member of the World Communion of Reformed Churches, World Council of Churches and the Hungarian Reformed Communion.
