= Ploské =

Ploské may refer to several places in Slovakia:

- Ploské, village and municipality in Košice-okolie District
- Ploské, village and municipality in Revúca District
