= Višňová =

Višňová may refer to places in the Czech Republic:

- Višňová (Jindřichův Hradec District), a municipality and village in the South Bohemian Region
- Višňová (Liberec District), a municipality and village in the Liberec Region
- Višňová (Příbram District), a municipality and village in the Central Bohemian Region

== See also ==
- Višňové (disambiguation)
