= Žiar, Revúca District =

Žiar Zsór
- Municipality
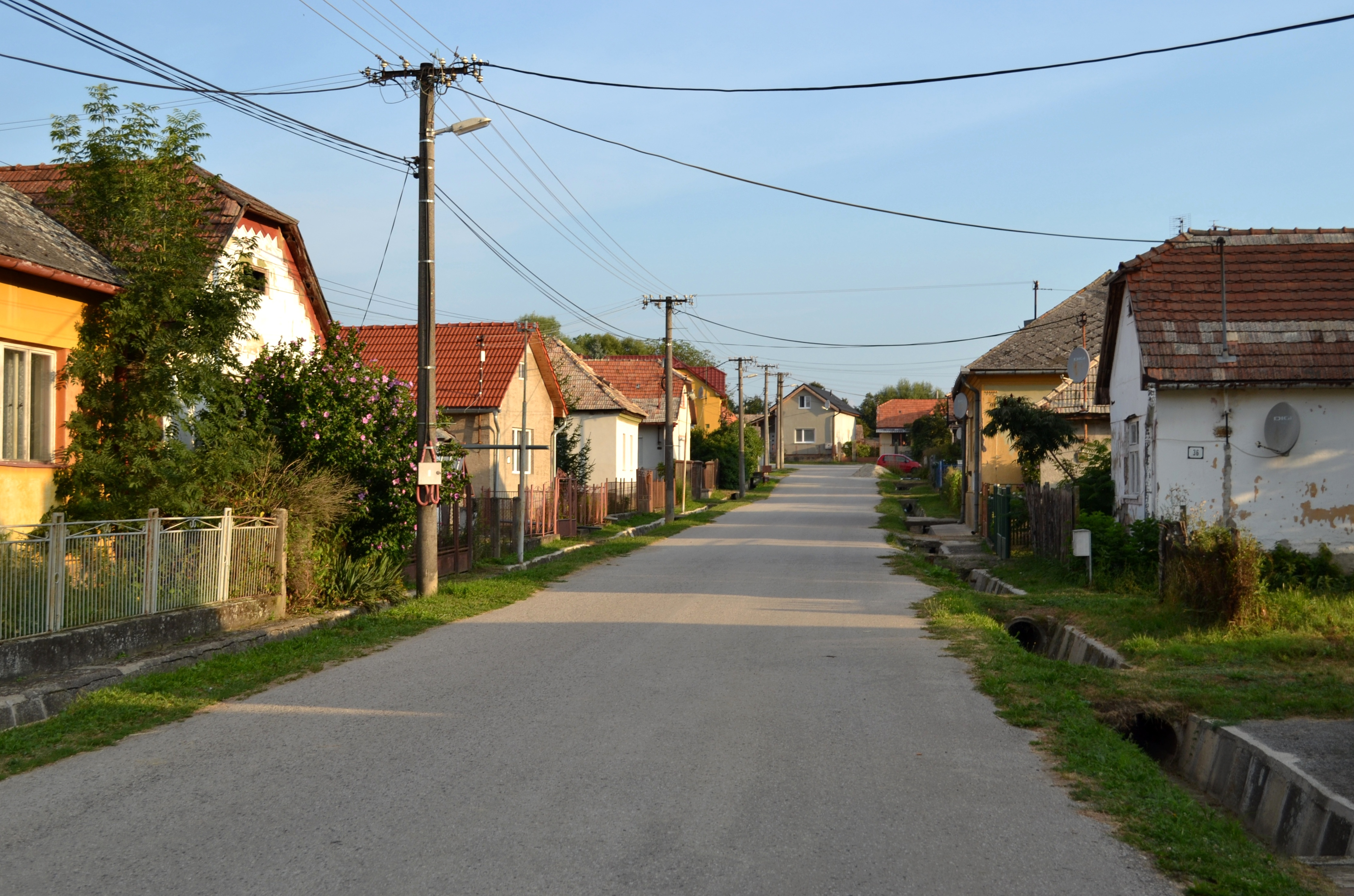

- Flag

- Location of Žiar in the Banská Bystrica Region Location of Žiar in Slovakia
- Coordinates: 48°26′15″N 20°16′30″E
- Country: Slovakia
- Region: Banská Bystrica Region
- District: Revúca District
- First mentioned: 1324

Area
  - Total: 4.99 km^{2} (1.93 sq mi)
- Elevation: 180 m (590 ft)

Population (2025)
  - Total: 107
- Time zone: UTC+1 (CET)
  - Summer (DST): UTC+2 (CEST)
- Postal code: 982 01
- Area code: +421 47
- Vehicle registration plate (until 2022): RA
- Website: ziar.webnode.sk

Žiar (Hungarian: Zsór) is a village and municipality in Revúca District in the Banská Bystrica Region of Slovakia.

== Population ==
Population statistic (10 years)
| Year | 1995 | 2005 | 2015 | 2025 |
|---|---|---|---|---|
| Count | 178 | 147 | 141 | 107 |
| Difference | | −17.41% | −4.08% | −24.11% |

Population statistic
| Year | 2024 | 2025 |
|---|---|---|
| Count | 110 | 107 |
| Difference | | −2.72% |

It has a population of 107 people (31 December 2025).

=== Ethnicity ===
Census 2021 (1+ %)
| Ethnicity | Number | Fraction |
|---|---|---|
| Hungarian | 75 | 67.56% |
| Slovak | 41 | 36.93% |
| Czech | 3 | 2.7% |
| Romani | 2 | 1.8% |
| Total | 111 | |

In year 2021 was 111 people by ethnicity 75 as Hungarian, 41 as Slovak, 3 as Czech, 2 as Romani and 1 as Not found out.

Note on population: The difference values of population numbers in the table "Population statistic" and in the sections "Ethnicity" & "Religion" is caused by the use of various statistical methods.

=== Religion ===
Census 2021 (1+ %)
| Religion | Number | Fraction |
|---|---|---|
| None | 37 | 33.33% |
| Calvinist Church | 36 | 32.43% |
| Roman Catholic Church | 25 | 22.52% |
| Evangelical Church | 12 | 10.81% |
| Total | 111 | |

In year 2021 was 111 people by religion 37 from None, 36 from Calvinist Church, 25 from Roman Catholic Church, 12 from Evangelical Church and 1 from Other.
