= Otročok =

Otročok Otrokocs
- Municipality
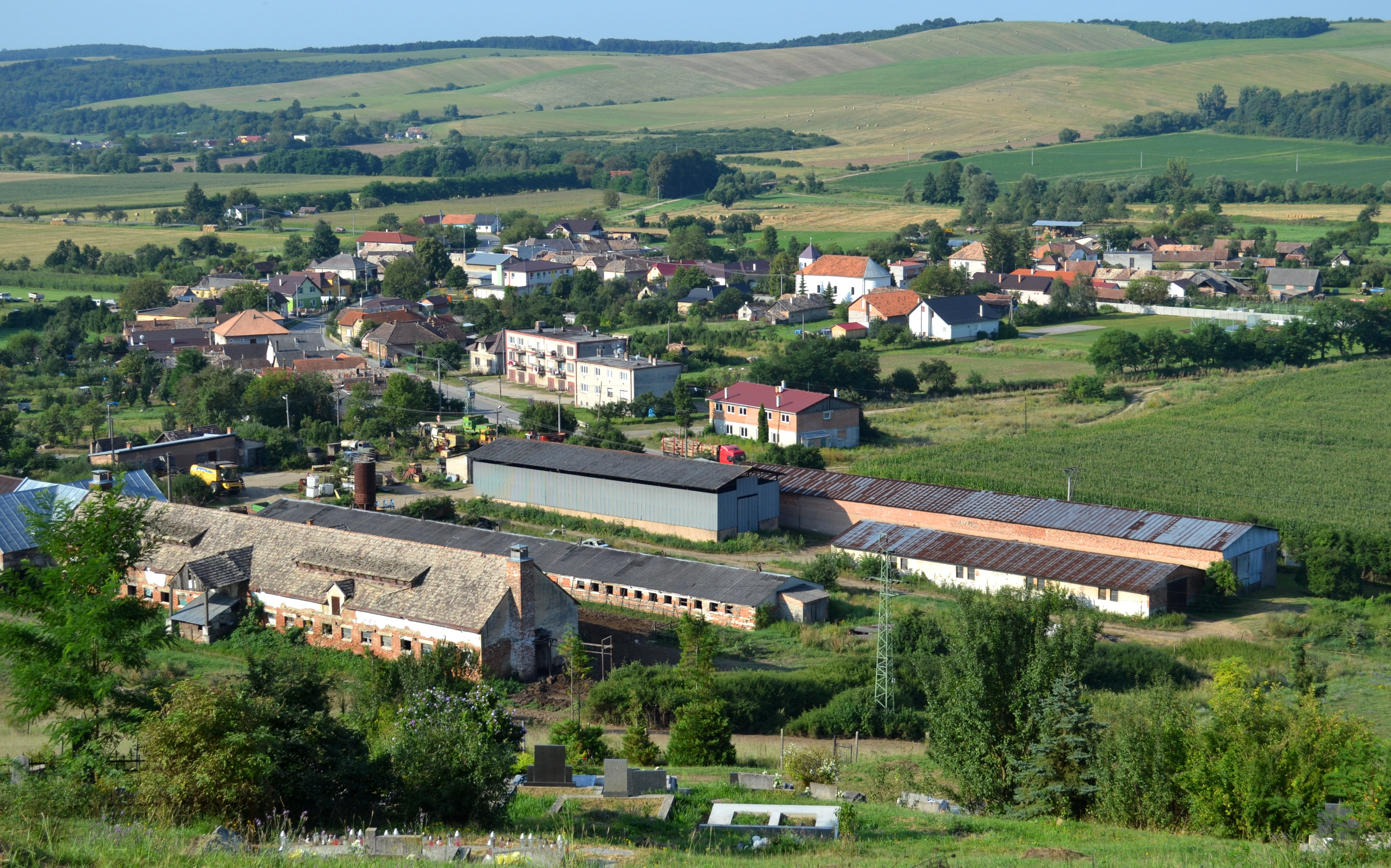

- Flag

- Location of Otročok in the Banská Bystrica Region Location of Otročok in Slovakia
- Coordinates: 48.45°N 20.28°E
- Country: Slovakia
- Region: Banská Bystrica Region
- District: Revúca District
- First mentioned: 1274

Area
  - Total: 5.38 km^{2} (2.08 sq mi)
- Elevation: 186 m (610 ft)

Population (2025)
  - Total: 319
- Time zone: UTC+1 (CET)
  - Summer (DST): UTC+2 (CEST)
- Postal code: 982 62
- Area code: +421 47
- Vehicle registration plate (until 2022): RA
- Website: www.otrocok.sk

Otročok (Hungarian: Otrokocs) is a village and municipality in Revúca District in the Banská Bystrica Region of Slovakia.

== Geography ==
The municipality lies at an altitude of 186 metres (610 ft) and covers an area of 5.38 km^{2} (2.08 sq mi) (2025).

== Population ==
Population statistic (10 years)
Year	1995	2005	2015	2025
Count	252	300	326	319
Difference		+19.04%	+8.66%	−2.14%

Population statistic
Year	2024	2025
Count	320	319
Difference		−0.31%

It has a population of 319 people (31 December 2025).

=== Ethnicity ===
Census 2021 (1+ %)
Ethnicity	Number	Fraction
Hungarian	250	75.3%
Slovak	92	27.71%
Not found out	9	2.71%
Romani	4	1.2%
Total	332	

In year 2021 was 332 people by ethnicity 250 as Hungarian, 92 as Slovak, 9 as Not found out, 4 as Romani and 1 as Russian.

Note on population: The difference values of population numbers in the table "Population statistic" and in the sections "Ethnicity" & "Religion" is caused by the use of various statistical methods.

=== Religion ===
Census 2021 (1+ %)
Religion	Number	Fraction
None	125	37.65%
Roman Catholic Church	114	34.34%
Calvinist Church	73	21.99%
Evangelical Church	10	3.01%
Not found out	6	1.81%
Total	332	

In year 2021 was 332 people by religion 125 from None, 114 from Roman Catholic Church, 73 from Calvinist Church, 10 from Evangelical Church, 6 from Not found out, 2 from Jehovah's Witnesses, 1 from Greek Catholic Church and 1 from United Methodist Church.
