= Gemerský Sad =

Gemerský Sad Gömörliget
- Municipality
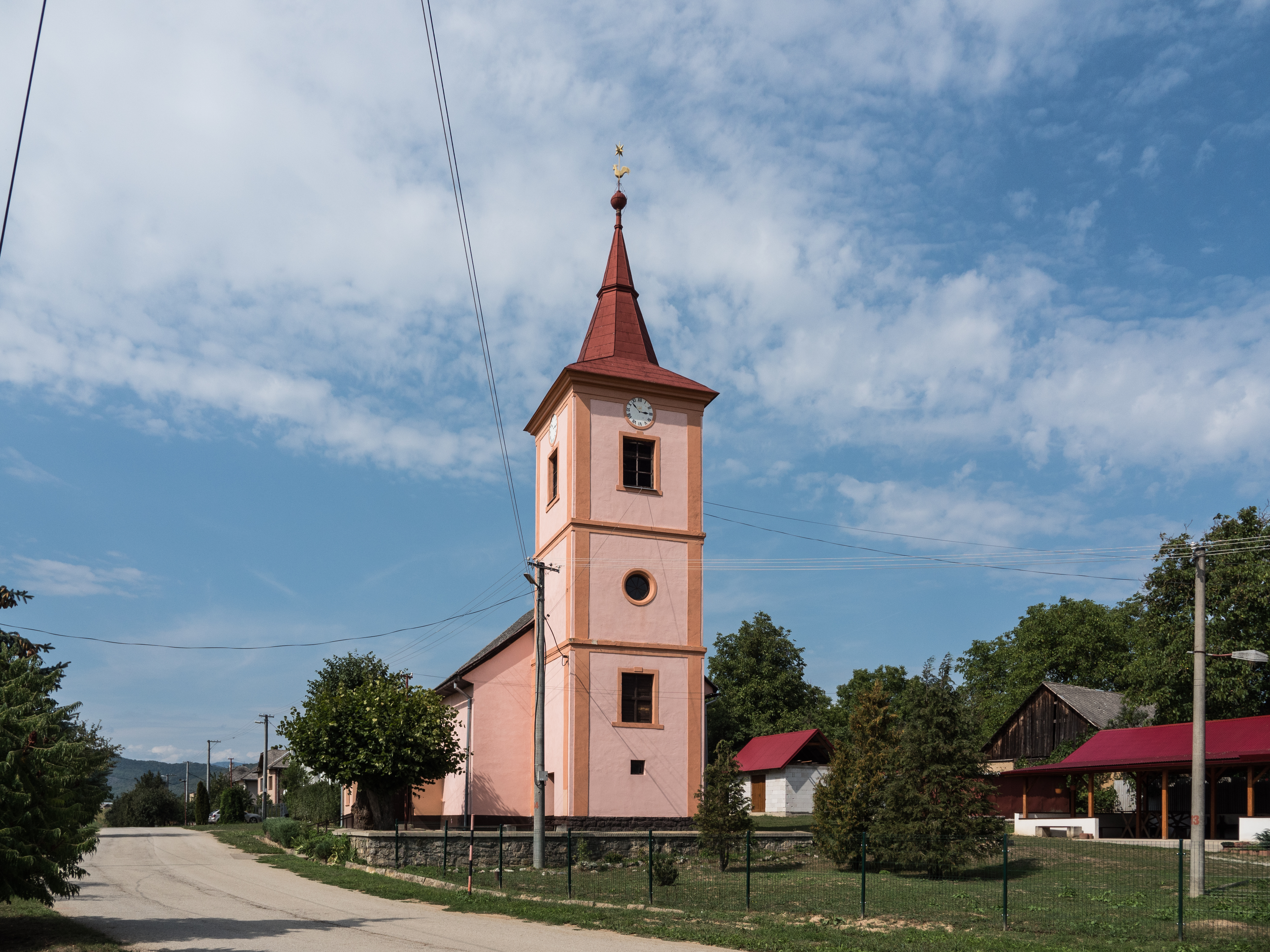

- Flag

- Location of Gemerský Sad in the Banská Bystrica Region Location of Gemerský Sad in Slovakia
- Coordinates: 48.59°N 20.31°E
- Country: Slovakia
- Region: Banská Bystrica Region
- District: Revúca District
- First mentioned: 1258

Area
  - Total: 12.18 km^{2} (4.70 sq mi)
- Elevation: 253 m (830 ft)

Population (2025)
  - Total: 285
- Time zone: UTC+1 (CET)
  - Summer (DST): UTC+2 (CEST)
- Postal code: 491 3
- Area code: +421 58
- Vehicle registration plate (until 2022): RA
- Website: www.gemerskysad.sk

Gemerský Sad (Hungarian: Gömörliget) is a village and municipality in Revúca District in the Banská Bystrica Region of Slovakia.

== Geography ==
The municipality lies at an altitude of 253 metres (830 ft) and covers an area of 12.18 km^{2} (4.70 sq mi) (2025).

== History ==
It arose in 1964 for the union of Mikolčany and Nováčany (Hungarian: Naszray) in one Municipality. Mikolčany was first mentioned in 1337 (1337 Mykoucha, 1340 Mykocha, 1351 Mykochan, 1486 Mykolchan) when it belonged to feudatoris Zachy. In 1427 King Ladislav established here some Székelys. In 1582 it was destroyed by Turks. Nováčany was first mentioned in 1258 (1258 Zahy, 1337 Noztre, 1427 Naztrad, 1486 Nostray, 1563 Nowaczan) when it belonged to local Lords Zahy. After it passed to Giczey local feudatories. From 1938 to 1945 both the villages were annexed by Hungary.

== Population ==
Population statistic (10 years)
Year	1995	2005	2015	2025
Count	344	317	308	285
Difference		−7.84%	−2.83%	−7.46%

Population statistic
Year	2024	2025
Count	289	285
Difference		−1.38%

It has a population of 285 people (31 December 2025).

=== Ethnicity ===
Census 2021 (1+ %)
Ethnicity	Number	Fraction
Slovak	171	57.19%
Hungarian	122	40.8%
Romani	15	5.01%
Not found out	13	4.34%
Czech	4	1.33%
Total	299	

In year 2021 was 299 people by ethnicity 171 as Slovak, 122 as Hungarian, 15 as Romani, 13 as Not found out and 4 as Czech.

Note on population: The difference values of population numbers in the table "Population statistic" and in the sections "Ethnicity" & "Religion" is caused by the use of various statistical methods.

=== Religion ===
Census 2021 (1+ %)
Religion	Number	Fraction
None	99	33.11%
Calvinist Church	92	30.77%
Roman Catholic Church	54	18.06%
Evangelical Church	26	8.7%
Not found out	13	4.35%
Jehovah's Witnesses	8	2.68%
Greek Catholic Church	3	1%
Total	299	

In year 2021 was 299 people by religion 99 from None, 92 from Calvinist Church, 54 from Roman Catholic Church, 26 from Evangelical Church, 13 from Not found out, 8 from Jehovah's Witnesses, 3 from Greek Catholic Church, 2 from United Methodist Church, 1 from Paganism and natural spirituality and 1 from Ad hoc movements.

== Genealogical resources ==
The records for genealogical research are available at the state archive "Statny Archiv in Kosice, Slovakia"

- Roman Catholic church records (births/marriages/deaths): 1779-1898 (parish B)
- Reformated church records (births/marriages/deaths): 1763-1900 (parish B)

== See also ==
- List of municipalities and towns in Slovakia
