= Višňové =

Višňové may refer to places:

== Czech Republic ==
- Višňové (Znojmo District)

== Slovakia ==
- Višňové, Nové Mesto nad Váhom District
- Višňové, Revúca District
- Višňové, Žilina District
- Višňové tunnel, a motorway tunnel
