= Muránska Huta =

Muránska Huta Murányhuta
- Municipality
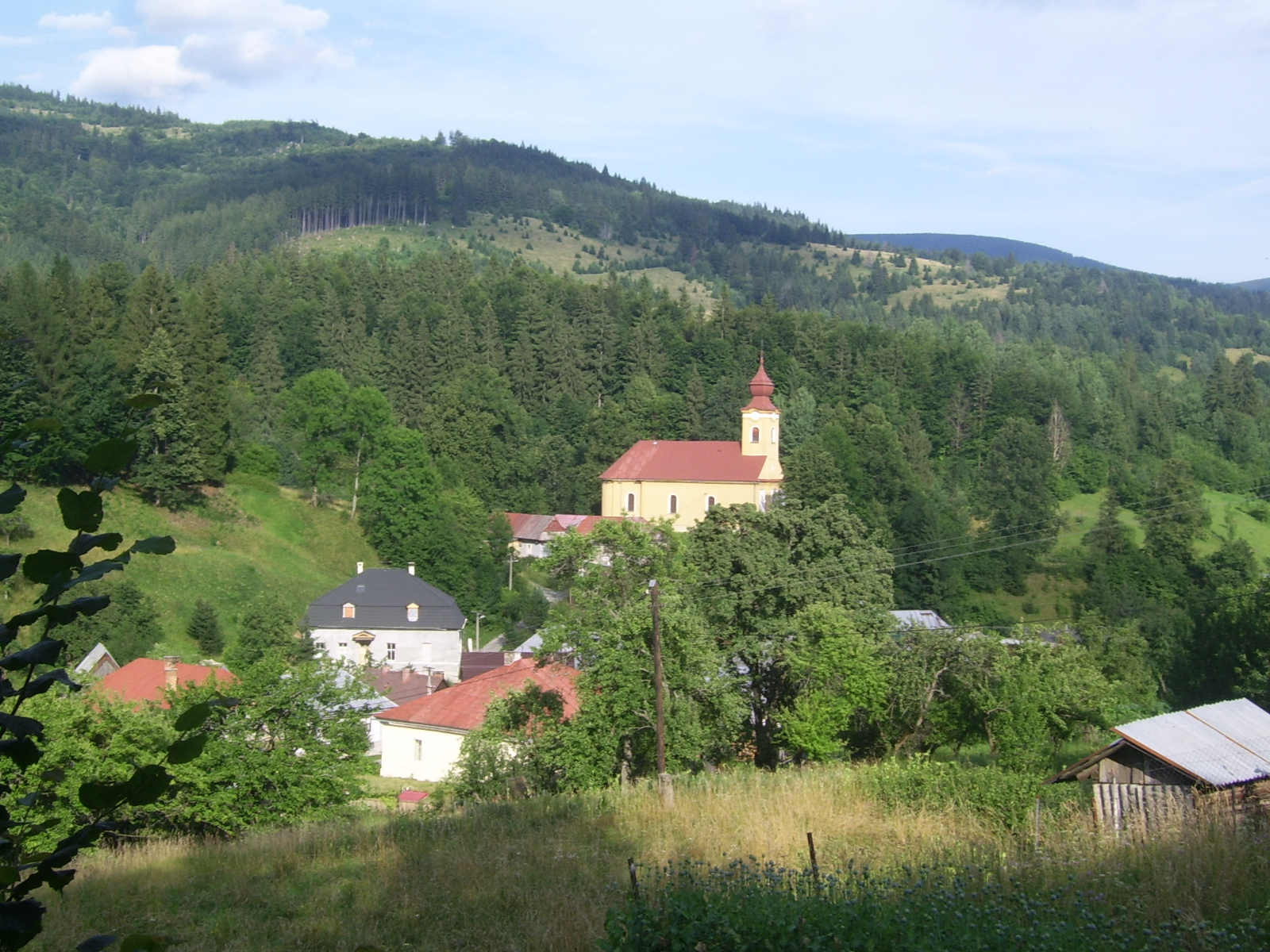

- Flag

- Location of Muránska Huta in the Banská Bystrica Region Location of Muránska Huta in Slovakia
- Coordinates: 48.78°N 20.12°E
- Country: Slovakia
- Region: Banská Bystrica Region
- District: Revúca District
- First mentioned: 1691

Area
  - Total: 8.45 km^{2} (3.26 sq mi)
- Elevation: 688 m (2,257 ft)

Population (2025)
  - Total: 173
- Time zone: UTC+1 (CET)
  - Summer (DST): UTC+2 (CEST)
- Postal code: 490 2
- Area code: +421 58
- Vehicle registration plate (until 2022): RA
- Website: www.muranskahuta.sk

Muránska Huta (Hungarian: Murányhuta) is a village and municipality in Revúca District in the Banská Bystrica Region of Slovakia.

== Geography ==
The municipality lies at an altitude of 688 metres (2,257 ft) and covers an area of 8.45 km^{2} (3.26 sq mi) (2025).

== Population ==
Population statistic (10 years)
| Year | 1995 | 2005 | 2015 | 2025 |
|---|---|---|---|---|
| Count | 118 | 197 | 197 | 173 |
| Difference | | +66.94% | +0% | −12.18% |

Population statistic
| Year | 2024 | 2025 |
|---|---|---|
| Count | 172 | 173 |
| Difference | | +0.58% |

It has a population of 173 people (31 December 2025).

=== Ethnicity ===
Census 2021 (1+ %)
| Ethnicity | Number | Fraction |
|---|---|---|
| Slovak | 168 | 94.38% |
| Not found out | 8 | 4.49% |
| Czech | 2 | 1.12% |
| Romani | 2 | 1.12% |
| Rusyn | 2 | 1.12% |
| Other | 2 | 1.12% |
| Total | 178 | |

In year 2021 was 178 people by ethnicity 168 as Slovak, 8 as Not found out, 2 as Czech, 2 as Romani, 2 as Rusyn, 2 as Other and 1 as Hungarian.

Note on population: The difference values of population numbers in the table "Population statistic" and in the sections "Ethnicity" & "Religion" is caused by the use of various statistical methods.

=== Religion ===
Census 2021 (1+ %)
| Religion | Number | Fraction |
|---|---|---|
| Roman Catholic Church | 109 | 61.24% |
| None | 46 | 25.84% |
| Not found out | 6 | 3.37% |
| Evangelical Church | 6 | 3.37% |
| Eastern Orthodox Church | 4 | 2.25% |
| Greek Catholic Church | 4 | 2.25% |
| Total | 178 | |

In year 2021 was 178 people by religion 109 from Roman Catholic Church, 46 from None, 6 from Not found out, 6 from Evangelical Church, 4 from Eastern Orthodox Church, 4 from Greek Catholic Church, 1 from Paganism and natural spirituality, 1 from United Methodist Church and 1 from Baptists Church.
