= Sása, Revúca District =

Sása Szásza
- Municipality
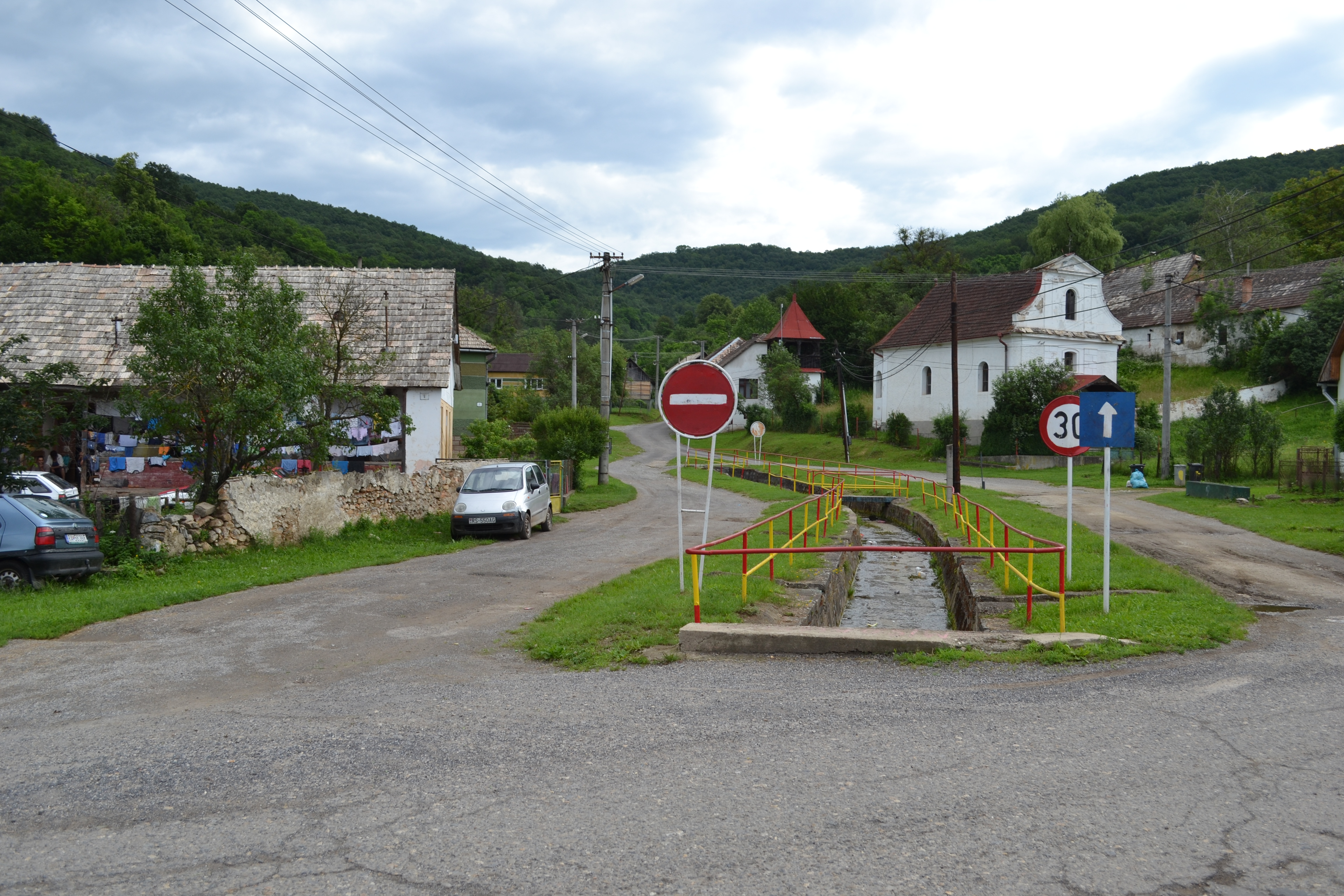

- Flag

- Location of Sása in the Banská Bystrica Region Location of Sása in Slovakia
- Coordinates: 48°33′50″N 20°06′30″E
- Country: Slovakia
- Region: Banská Bystrica Region
- District: Revúca District
- First mentioned: 1332

Area
  - Total: 4.60 km^{2} (1.78 sq mi)
- Elevation: 284 m (932 ft)

Population (2025)
  - Total: 232
- Time zone: UTC+1 (CET)
  - Summer (DST): UTC+2 (CEST)
- Postal code: 982 64
- Area code: +421 47
- Vehicle registration plate (until 2022): RA
- Website: www.obecsasa.sk

Sása (Hungarian: Szásza) is a village and municipality in Revúca District in the Banská Bystrica Region of Slovakia.

== Population ==
Population statistic (10 years)
Year	1995	2005	2015	2025
Count	125	147	199	232
Difference		+17.6%	+35.37%	+16.58%

Population statistic
Year	2024	2025
Count	220	232
Difference		+5.45%

It has a population of 232 people (31 December 2025).

=== Ethnicity ===
Census 2021 (1+ %)
Ethnicity	Number	Fraction
Slovak	176	94.62%
Not found out	9	4.83%
Total	186	

In year 2021 was 186 people by ethnicity 176 as Slovak, 9 as Not found out, 1 as Czech and 1 as Romani.

Note on population: The difference values of population numbers in the table "Population statistic" and in the sections "Ethnicity" & "Religion" is caused by the use of various statistical methods.

=== Religion ===
Census 2021 (1+ %)
Religion	Number	Fraction
None	145	77.96%
Roman Catholic Church	25	13.44%
Evangelical Church	10	5.38%
Not found out	6	3.23%
Total	186	

In year 2021 was 186 people by religion 145 from None, 25 from Roman Catholic Church, 10 from Evangelical Church and 6 from Not found out.

The majority of the municipality's population consists of the members of the local Roma community. In 2019, they constituted an estimated 90% of the population.
