= Ratkovské Bystré =

Ratkovské Bystré Ratkósebes
- Municipality
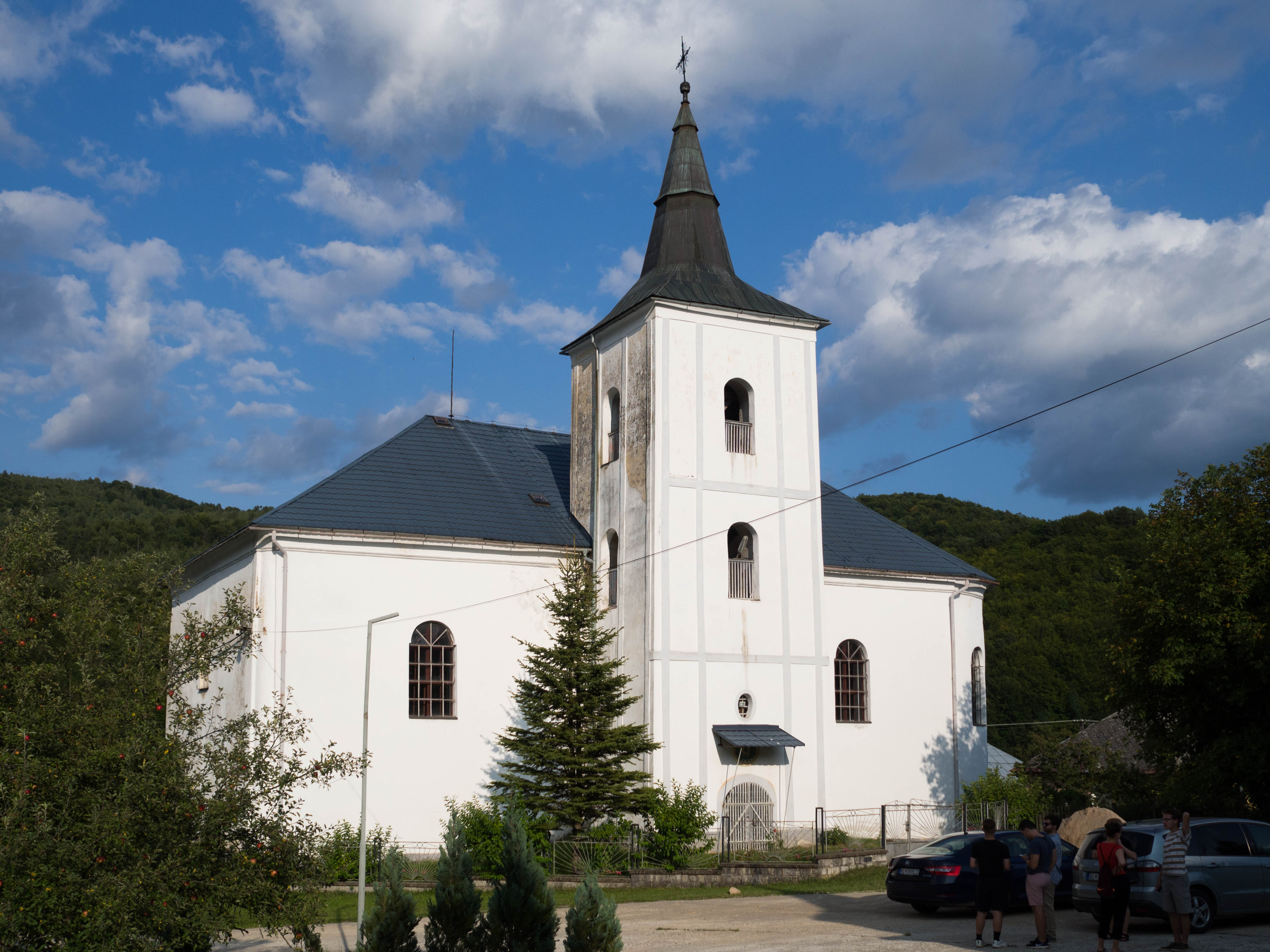

- Flag

- Location of Ratkovské Bystré in the Banská Bystrica Region Location of Ratkovské Bystré in Slovakia
- Coordinates: 48.65°N 20.05°E
- Country: Slovakia
- Region: Banská Bystrica Region
- District: Revúca District
- First mentioned: 1413

Area
  - Total: 27.40 km^{2} (10.58 sq mi)
- Elevation: 402 m (1,319 ft)

Population (2025)
  - Total: 293
- Time zone: UTC+1 (CET)
  - Summer (DST): UTC+2 (CEST)
- Postal code: 982 66
- Area code: +421 47
- Vehicle registration plate (until 2022): RA
- Website: www.ratkovskebystre.sk

Ratkovské Bystré (Hungarian: Ratkósebes) is a village and municipality in Revúca District in the Banská Bystrica Region of Slovakia.

== Geography ==
The municipality lies at an altitude of 402 metres (1,319 ft) and covers an area of 27.40 km^{2} (10.58 sq mi) (2025).

== Population ==
Population statistic (10 years)
Year	1995	2005	2015	2025
Count	462	397	360	293
Difference		−14.06%	−9.31%	−18.61%

Population statistic
Year	2024	2025
Count	289	293
Difference		+1.38%

It has a population of 293 people (31 December 2025).

=== Ethnicity ===
Census 2021 (1+ %)
Ethnicity	Number	Fraction
Slovak	287	94.4%
Not found out	10	3.28%
Hungarian	8	2.63%
Total	304	

In year 2021 was 304 people by ethnicity 287 as Slovak, 10 as Not found out, 8 as Hungarian, 1 as Czech, 1 as Romani, 1 as Russian and 1 as Moravian.

Note on population: The difference values of population numbers in the table "Population statistic" and in the sections "Ethnicity" & "Religion" is caused by the use of various statistical methods.

=== Religion ===
Census 2021 (1+ %)
Religion	Number	Fraction
Evangelical Church	190	62.5%
None	85	27.96%
Roman Catholic Church	17	5.59%
Not found out	5	1.64%
Total	304	

In year 2021 was 304 people by religion 190 from Evangelical Church, 85 from None, 17 from Roman Catholic Church, 5 from Not found out, 3 from United Methodist Church, 1 from Eastern Orthodox Church, 1 from Other and not ascertained christian church, 1 from Jehovah's Witnesses and 1 from Other.
