= Chvalová =

Chvalová Felsőfalu
- Municipality
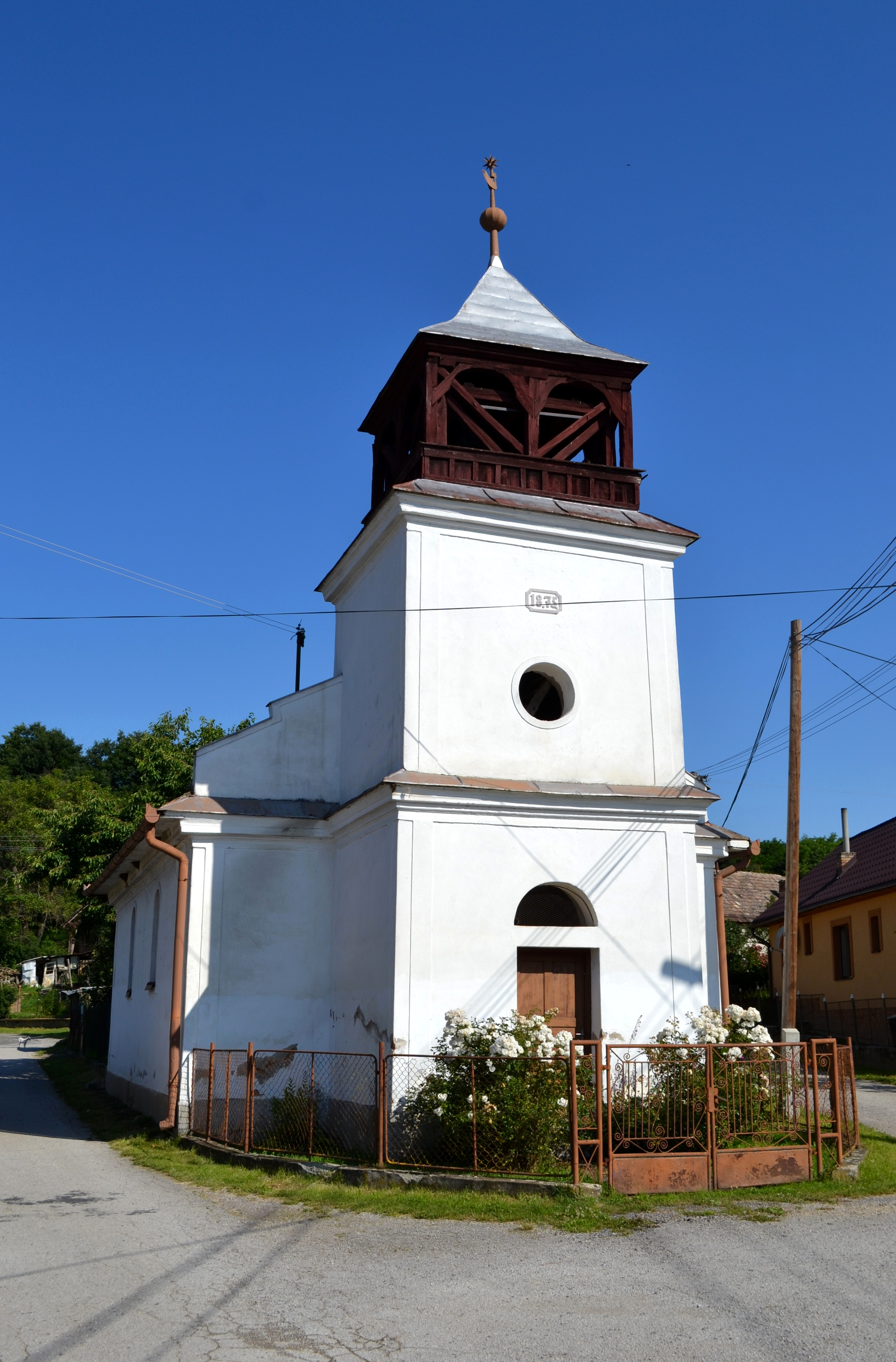

- Flag

- Location of Chvalová in the Banská Bystrica Region Location of Chvalová in Slovakia
- Coordinates: 48.52°N 20.18°E
- Country: Slovakia
- Region: Banská Bystrica Region
- District: Revúca District
- First mentioned: 1343

Area
  - Total: 9.28 km^{2} (3.58 sq mi)
- Elevation: 222 m (728 ft)

Population (2025)
  - Total: 197
- Time zone: UTC+1 (CET)
  - Summer (DST): UTC+2 (CEST)
- Postal code: 982 63
- Area code: +421 47
- Vehicle registration plate (until 2022): RA
- Website: www.chvalova.sk

Chvalová (Hungarian: Felsőfalu) is a village and municipality in Revúca District in the Banská Bystrica Region of Slovakia.

== Geography ==
The municipality lies at an altitude of 222 metres (728 ft) and covers an area of 9.28 km^{2} (3.58 sq mi) (2025).

== History ==
In historical records, the village was first mentioned in 1343 when it passed from local Lords Szkárosy to noble Soldosy family. It was destroyed from Turks in the 16th century. From 1938 to 1945 it was annexed by Hungary.

== Population ==
Population statistic (10 years)
| Year | 1995 | 2005 | 2015 | 2025 |
|---|---|---|---|---|
| Count | 157 | 164 | 215 | 197 |
| Difference | | +4.45% | +31.09% | −8.37% |

Population statistic
| Year | 2024 | 2025 |
|---|---|---|
| Count | 194 | 197 |
| Difference | | +1.54% |

It has a population of 197 people (31 December 2025).

=== Ethnicity ===
Census 2021 (1+ %)
| Ethnicity | Number | Fraction |
|---|---|---|
| Slovak | 98 | 50.51% |
| Hungarian | 97 | 50% |
| Romani | 50 | 25.77% |
| Not found out | 4 | 2.06% |
| Total | 194 | |

In year 2021 was 194 people by ethnicity 98 as Slovak, 97 as Hungarian, 50 as Romani, 4 as Not found out and 1 as Rusyn.

Note on population: The difference values of population numbers in the table "Population statistic" and in the sections "Ethnicity" & "Religion" is caused by the use of various statistical methods.

=== Religion ===
Census 2021 (1+ %)
| Religion | Number | Fraction |
|---|---|---|
| Roman Catholic Church | 68 | 35.05% |
| Calvinist Church | 55 | 28.35% |
| None | 54 | 27.84% |
| Evangelical Church | 9 | 4.64% |
| Greek Catholic Church | 5 | 2.58% |
| Not found out | 2 | 1.03% |
| Total | 194 | |

In year 2021 was 194 people by religion 68 from Roman Catholic Church, 55 from Calvinist Church, 54 from None, 9 from Evangelical Church, 5 from Greek Catholic Church, 2 from Not found out and 1 from Jehovah's Witnesses.

== Genealogical resources ==
The records for genealogical research are available at the state archive "Statny Archiv in Banska Bystrica, Slovakia"

- Roman Catholic church records (births/marriages/deaths): 1756-1896 (parish B)
- Reformated church records (births/marriages/deaths): 1787-1897 (parish B)

== See also ==
- List of municipalities and towns in Slovakia
