= Revúcka Lehota =

Revúcka Lehota Lehelfalva
- Municipality
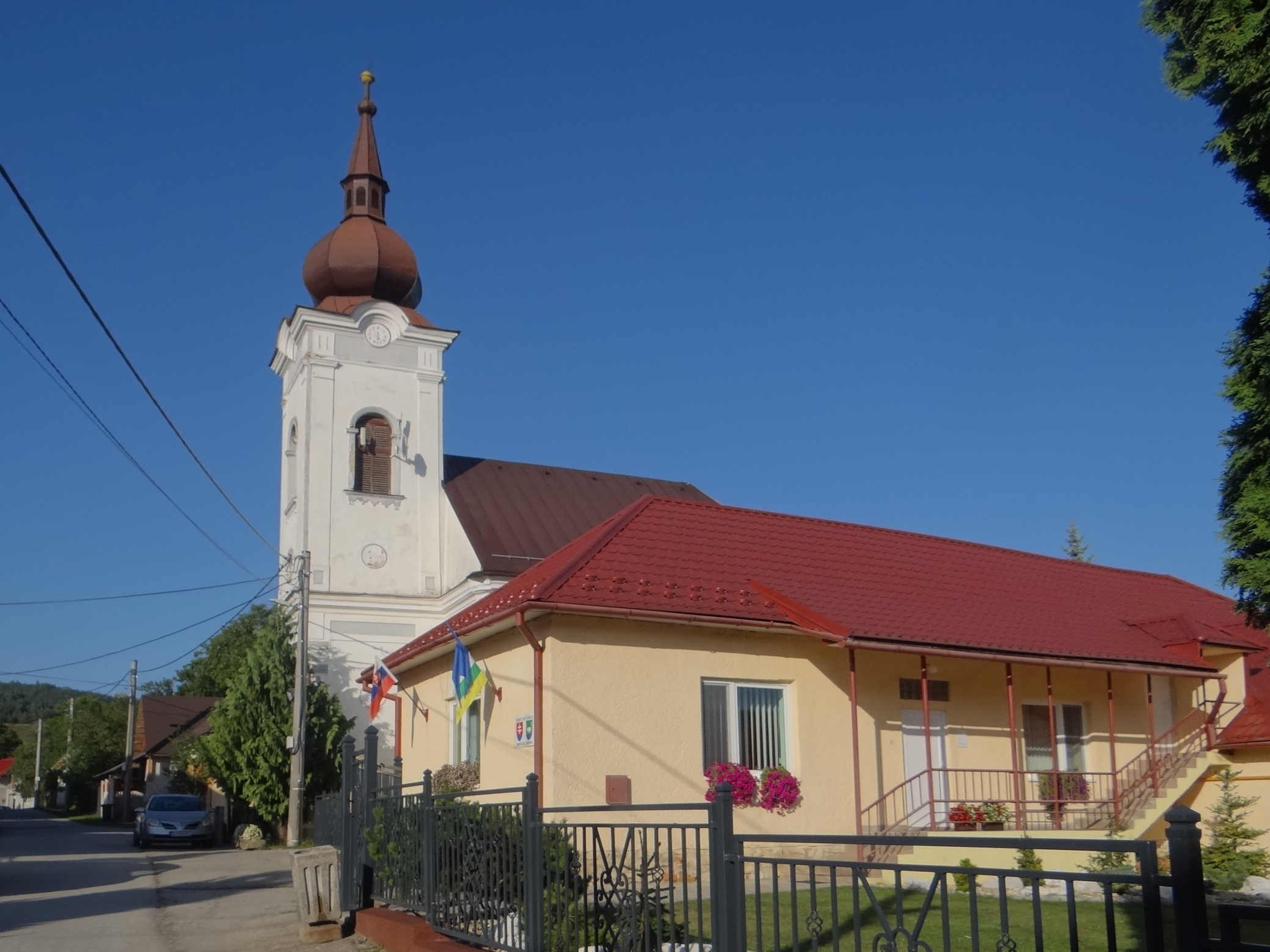

- Flag

- Location of Revúcka Lehota in the Banská Bystrica Region Location of Revúcka Lehota in Slovakia
- Coordinates: 48.68°N 20.18°E
- Country: Slovakia
- Region: Banská Bystrica Region
- District: Revúca District
- First mentioned: 1427

Area
  - Total: 6.83 km^{2} (2.64 sq mi)
- Elevation: 304 m (997 ft)

Population (2025)
  - Total: 316
- Time zone: UTC+1 (CET)
  - Summer (DST): UTC+2 (CEST)
- Postal code: 491 8
- Area code: +421 58
- Vehicle registration plate (until 2022): RA
- Website: revuckalehota.sk

Revúcka Lehota (Hungarian: Lehelfalva) is a village and municipality in Revúca District in the Banská Bystrica Region of Slovakia.

== Geography ==
The municipality lies at an altitude of 304 metres (997 ft) and covers an area of 6.83 km^{2} (2.64 sq mi) (2025).

== Population ==
Population statistic (10 years)
Year	1995	2005	2015	2025
Count	337	329	317	316
Difference		−2.37%	−3.64%	−0.31%

Population statistic
Year	2024	2025
Count	318	316
Difference		−0.62%

It has a population of 316 people (31 December 2025).

=== Ethnicity ===
Census 2021 (1+ %)
Ethnicity	Number	Fraction
Slovak	302	97.41%
Not found out	8	2.58%
Total	310	

In year 2021 was 310 people by ethnicity 302 as Slovak, 8 as Not found out, 3 as Czech, 3 as Hungarian, 1 as Russian and 1 as German.

Note on population: The difference values of population numbers in the table "Population statistic" and in the sections "Ethnicity" & "Religion" is caused by the use of various statistical methods.

=== Religion ===
Census 2021 (1+ %)
Religion	Number	Fraction
None	123	39.68%
Evangelical Church	78	25.16%
Baptists Church	49	15.81%
Roman Catholic Church	41	13.23%
Seventh-day Adventist Church	5	1.61%
Not found out	4	1.29%
Church of the Brethren	4	1.29%
Total	310	

In year 2021 was 310 people by religion 123 from None, 78 from Evangelical Church, 49 from Baptists Church, 41 from Roman Catholic Church, 5 from Seventh-day Adventist Church, 4 from Not found out, 4 from Church of the Brethren, 2 from Jehovah's Witnesses, 1 from Calvinist Church, 1 from Eastern Orthodox Church, 1 from Other and 1 from Ad hoc movements.
