= Polina, Revúca District =

Polina Alsófalu
- Municipality
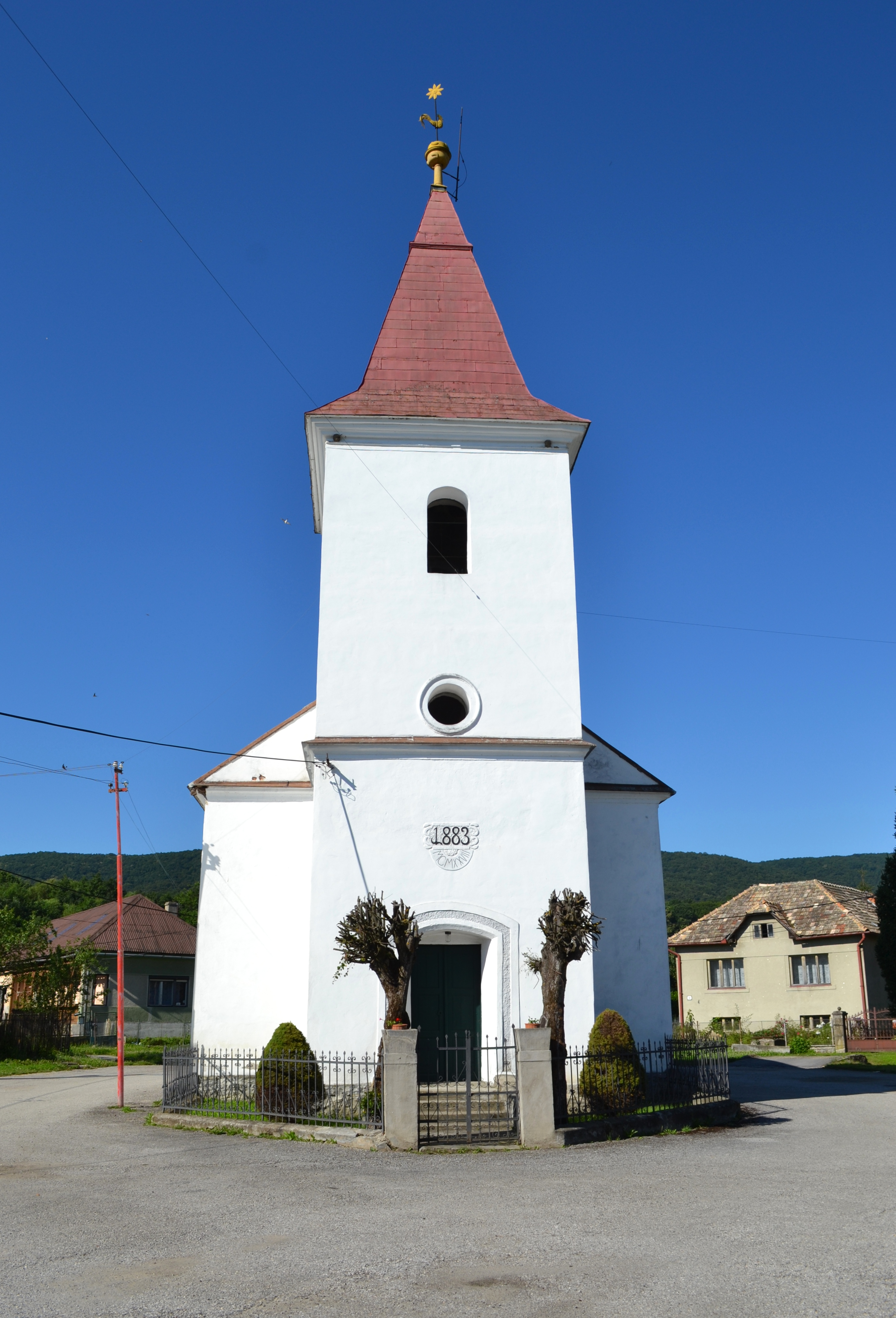

- Location of Polina in the Banská Bystrica Region Location of Polina in Slovakia
- Coordinates: 48°30′N 20°13′E
- Country: Slovakia
- Region: Banská Bystrica Region
- District: Revúca District
- First mentioned: 1325

Area
  - Total: 9.09 km^{2} (3.51 sq mi)
- Elevation: 209 m (686 ft)

Population (2025)
  - Total: 107
- Time zone: UTC+1 (CET)
  - Summer (DST): UTC+2 (CEST)
- Postal code: 982 63
- Area code: +421 47
- Vehicle registration plate (until 2022): RA
- Website: www.polina.sk

Polina (Hungarian: Alsófalu) is a hamlet in the Revúca District, Banská Bystrica Region, Slovakia.

== Population ==
Population statistic (10 years)
Year	1995	2005	2015	2025
Count	113	127	117	107
Difference		+12.38%	−7.87%	−8.54%

Population statistic
Year	2024	2025
Count	103	107
Difference		+3.88%

It has a population of 107 people (31 December 2025).

=== Ethnicity ===
Census 2021 (1+ %)
Ethnicity	Number	Fraction
Hungarian	59	66.29%
Slovak	32	35.95%
Romani	5	5.61%
Not found out	2	2.24%
Czech	1	1.12%
Total	89	

In year 2021 was 89 people by ethnicity 59 as Hungarian, 32 as Slovak, 5 as Romani, 2 as Not found out and 1 as Czech.

Note on population: The difference values of population numbers in the table "Population statistic" and in the sections "Ethnicity" & "Religion" is caused by the use of various statistical methods.

=== Religion ===
Census 2021 (1+ %)
Religion	Number	Fraction
Calvinist Church	44	49.44%
None	29	32.58%
Roman Catholic Church	11	12.36%
Evangelical Church	2	2.25%
Not found out	1	1.12%
Other	1	1.12%
Greek Catholic Church	1	1.12%
Total	89	

In year 2021 was 89 people by religion 44 from Calvinist Church, 29 from None, 11 from Roman Catholic Church, 2 from Evangelical Church, 1 from Not found out, 1 from Other and 1 from Greek Catholic Church.
