= Levkuška =

Municipality of Slovakia

Levkuška Lőkös
- Municipality
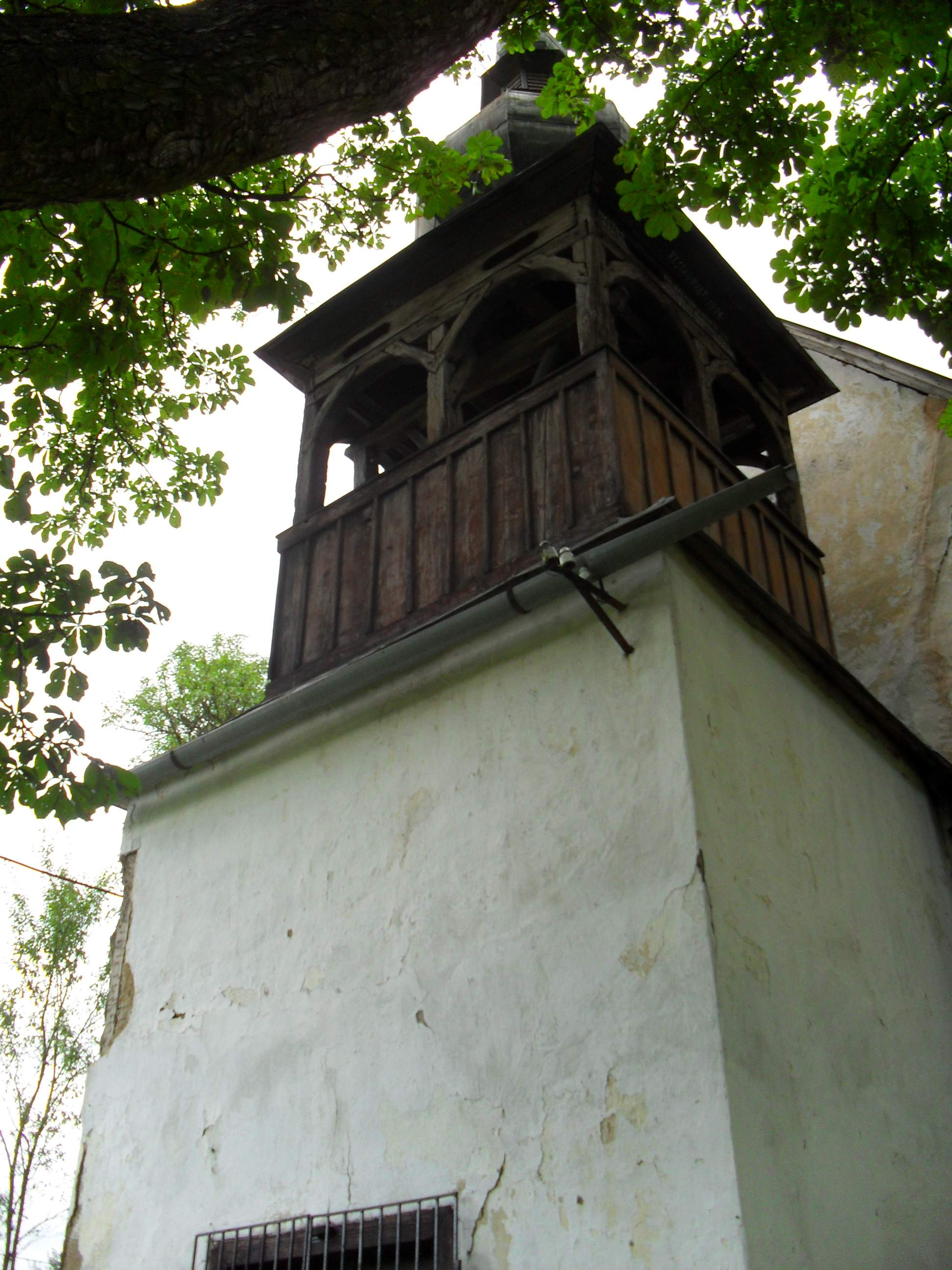

- Flag Coat of arms

- Location of Levkuška in the Banská Bystrica Region Location of Levkuška in Slovakia
- Coordinates: 48.47°N 20.27°E
- Country: Slovakia
- Region: Banská Bystrica Region
- District: Revúca District
- First mentioned: 1294

Area
  - Total: 3.63 km^{2} (1.40 sq mi)
- Elevation: 183 m (600 ft)

Population (2025)
  - Total: 254
- Time zone: UTC+1 (CET)
  - Summer (DST): UTC+2 (CEST)
- Postal code: 982 62
- Area code: +421 47
- Vehicle registration plate (until 2022): RA
- Website: www.obeclevkuska.sk

Levkuška (Hungarian: Lőkös) is a village and municipality in Revúca District in the Banská Bystrica Region of Slovakia.

== Geography ==
The municipality lies at an altitude of 183 metres (600 ft) and covers an area of 3.63 km^{2} (1.40 sq mi) (2025).

== Population ==
Population statistic (10 years)
Year	1995	2005	2015	2025
Count	241	218	235	254
Difference		−9.54%	+7.79%	+8.08%

Population statistic
Year	2024	2025
Count	252	254
Difference		+0.79%

It has a population of 254 people (31 December 2025).

=== Ethnicity ===
Census 2021 (1+ %)
Ethnicity	Number	Fraction
Hungarian	196	82%
Slovak	46	19.24%
Romani	26	10.87%
Not found out	7	2.92%
Total	239	

In year 2021 was 239 people by ethnicity 196 as Hungarian, 46 as Slovak, 26 as Romani, 7 as Not found out and 1 as Czech.

Note on population: The difference values of population numbers in the table "Population statistic" and in the sections "Ethnicity" & "Religion" is caused by the use of various statistical methods.

=== Religion ===
Census 2021 (1+ %)
Religion	Number	Fraction
Roman Catholic Church	90	37.66%
None	66	27.62%
Calvinist Church	51	21.34%
Evangelical Church	19	7.95%
Not found out	7	2.93%
United Methodist Church	3	1.26%
Total	239	

In year 2021 was 239 people by religion 90 from Roman Catholic Church, 66 from None, 51 from Calvinist Church, 19 from Evangelical Church, 7 from Not found out, 3 from United Methodist Church, 1 from Christian Congregations in Slovakia, 1 from Other and 1 from Greek Catholic Church.
