= Muránska Zdychava =

Muránska Zdychava Kakasalja
- Municipality
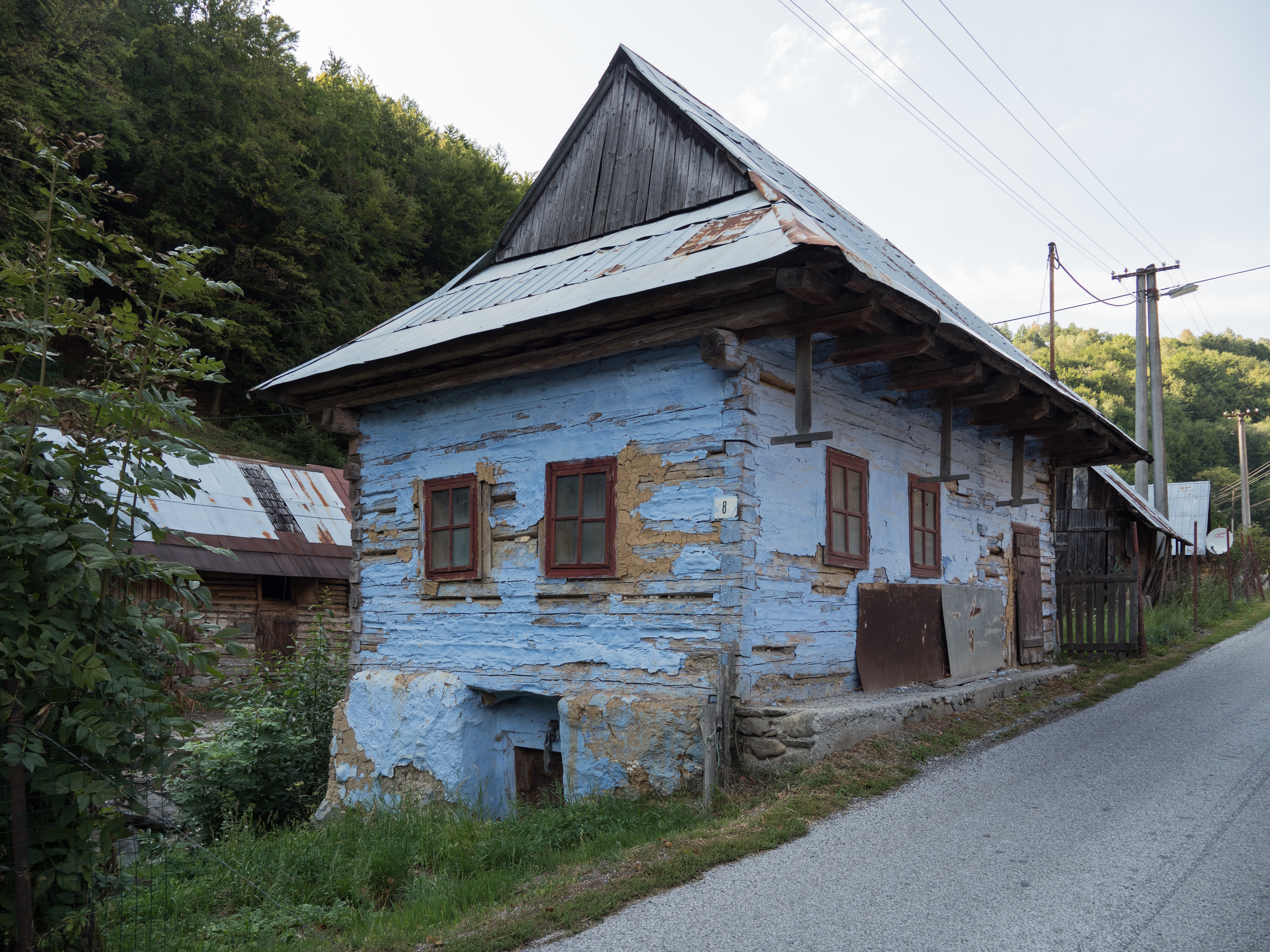

- Flag

- Location of Muránska Zdychava in the Banská Bystrica Region Location of Muránska Zdychava in Slovakia
- Coordinates: 48.74°N 20.14°E
- Country: Slovakia
- Region: Banská Bystrica Region
- District: Revúca District
- First mentioned: 1551

Area
  - Total: 28.58 km^{2} (11.03 sq mi)
- Elevation: 529 m (1,736 ft)

Population (2025)
  - Total: 211
- Time zone: UTC+1 (CET)
  - Summer (DST): UTC+2 (CEST)
- Postal code: 500 1
- Area code: +421 58
- Vehicle registration plate (until 2022): RA
- Website: www.obec-muranskazdychava.sk

Muránska Zdychava (Hungarian: Kakasalja) is a village and municipality in Revúca District in the Banská Bystrica Region of Slovakia.

== Geography ==
The municipality lies at an altitude of 529 metres (1,736 ft) and covers an area of 28.58 km^{2} (11.03 sq mi) (2025).

== Population ==
Population statistic (10 years)
Year	1995	2005	2015	2025
Count	301	286	260	211
Difference		−4.98%	−9.09%	−18.84%

Population statistic
Year	2024	2025
Count	218	211
Difference		−3.21%

It has a population of 211 people (31 December 2025).

=== Ethnicity ===
Census 2021 (1+ %)
Ethnicity	Number	Fraction
Slovak	224	98.24%
Hungarian	3	1.31%
Total	228	

In year 2021 was 228 people by ethnicity 224 as Slovak, 3 as Hungarian, 1 as Polish, 1 as Not found out and 1 as Other.

Note on population: The difference values of population numbers in the table "Population statistic" and in the sections "Ethnicity" & "Religion" is caused by the use of various statistical methods.

=== Religion ===
Census 2021 (1+ %)
Religion	Number	Fraction
Roman Catholic Church	186	81.58%
None	31	13.6%
Christian Congregations in Slovakia	3	1.32%
Total	228	

In year 2021 was 228 people by religion 186 from Roman Catholic Church, 31 from None, 3 from Christian Congregations in Slovakia, 2 from Evangelical Church, 1 from Calvinist Church, 1 from Not found out, 1 from Islam, 1 from Greek Catholic Church, 1 from Seventh-day Adventist Church and 1 from Buddhism.
