= Sirk, Revúca District =

Sirk Szirk
- Municipality
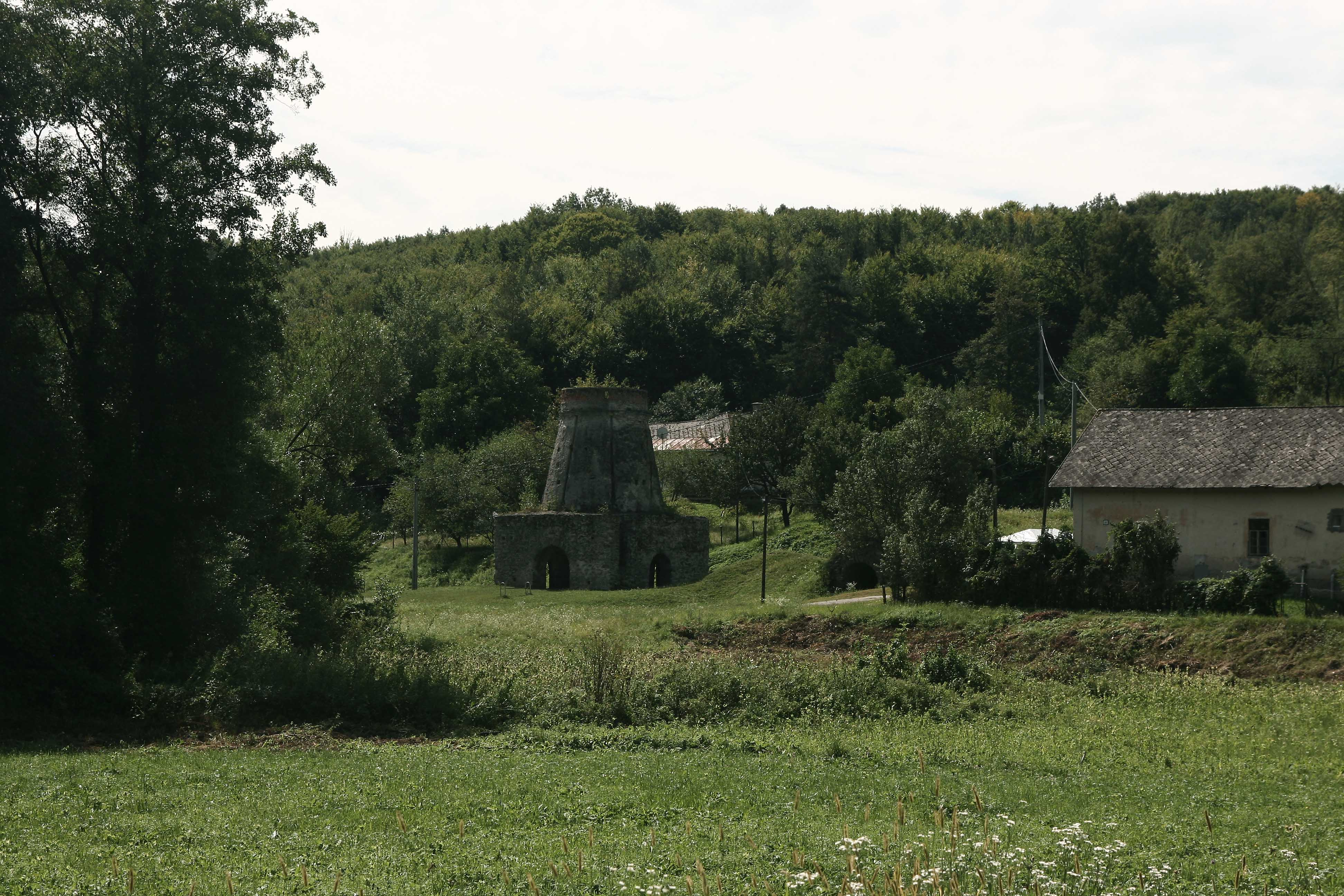

- Flag

- Location of Sirk in the Banská Bystrica Region Location of Sirk in Slovakia
- Coordinates: 48°37′00″N 20°06′00″E
- Country: Slovakia
- Region: Banská Bystrica Region
- District: Revúca District
- First mentioned: 1421

Area
  - Total: 18.33 km^{2} (7.08 sq mi)
- Elevation: 404 m (1,325 ft)

Population (2025)
  - Total: 1,384
- Time zone: UTC+1 (CET)
  - Summer (DST): UTC+2 (CEST)
- Postal code: 496 4
- Area code: +421 58
- Vehicle registration plate (until 2022): RA
- Website: obecsirk.sk

Sirk (Hungarian: Szirk) is a village and municipality in Revúca District in the Banská Bystrica Region of Slovakia.

== Population ==
Population statistic (10 years)
Year	1995	2005	2015	2025
Count	983	1042	1205	1384
Difference		+6.00%	+15.64%	+14.85%

Population statistic
Year	2024	2025
Count	1380	1384
Difference		+0.28%

It has a population of 1384 people (31 December 2025).

=== Ethnicity ===
Census 2021 (1+ %)
Ethnicity	Number	Fraction
Slovak	1256	95.58%
Not found out	52	3.95%
Romani	16	1.21%
Total	1314	

In year 2021 was 1314 people by ethnicity 1256 as Slovak, 52 as Not found out, 16 as Romani, 8 as Czech and 8 as Hungarian.

Note on population: The difference values of population numbers in the table "Population statistic" and in the sections "Ethnicity" & "Religion" is caused by the use of various statistical methods.

=== Religion ===
Census 2021 (1+ %)
Religion	Number	Fraction
None	1038	79%
Evangelical Church	138	10.5%
Roman Catholic Church	84	6.39%
Not found out	48	3.65%
Total	1314	

In year 2021 was 1314 people by religion 1038 from None, 138 from Evangelical Church, 84 from Roman Catholic Church, 48 from Not found out, 1 from Jehovah's Witnesses, 1 from Other, 1 from Greek Catholic Church, 1 from United Methodist Church, 1 from Buddhism and 1 from Ad hoc movements.
