= Rašice =

Rašice Felsőrás
- Municipality
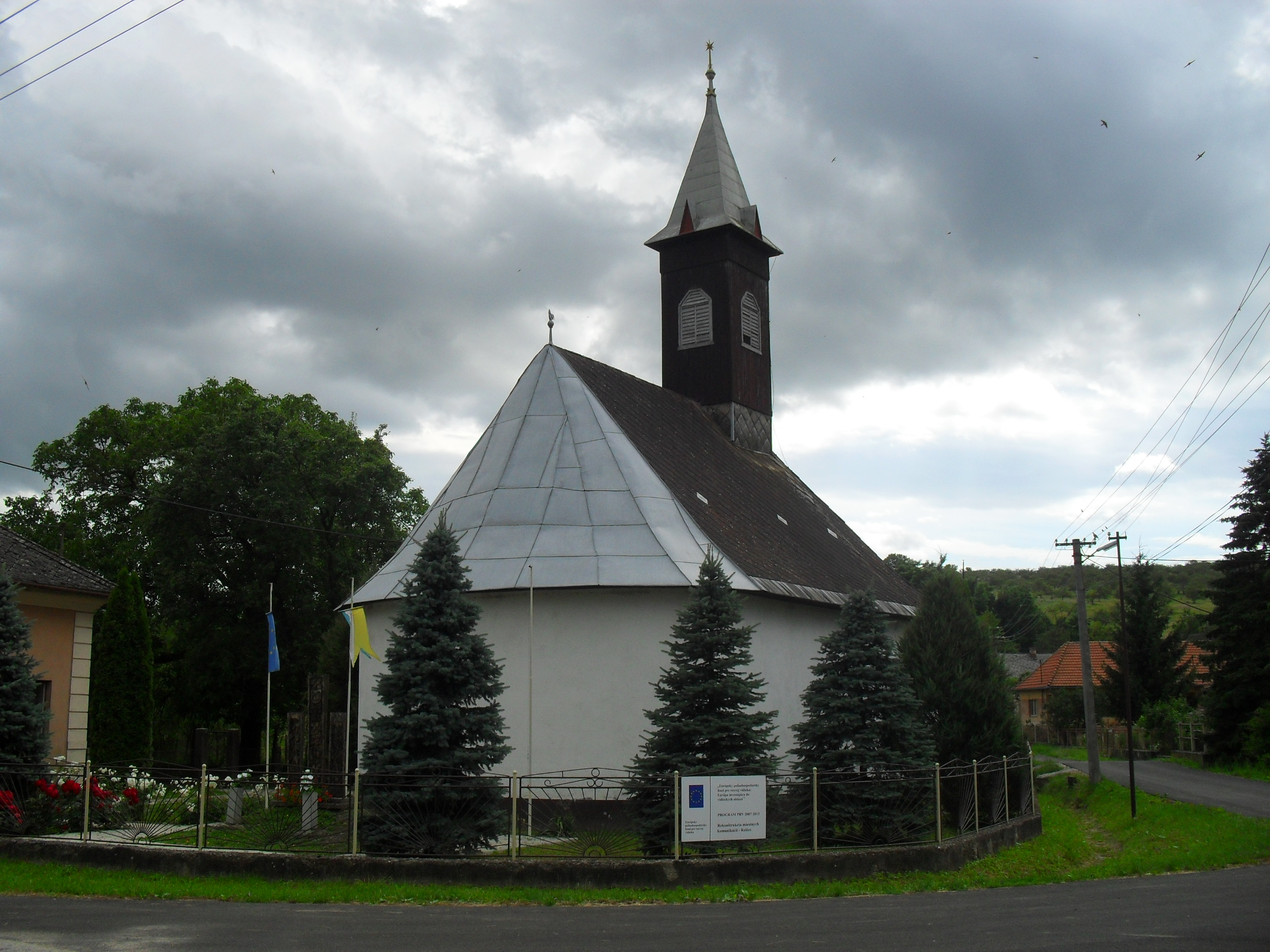

- Flag Coat of arms

- Location of Rašice in the Banská Bystrica Region Location of Rašice in Slovakia
- Coordinates: 48.47°N 20.25°E
- Country: Slovakia
- Region: Banská Bystrica Region
- District: Revúca District
- First mentioned: 1334

Area
  - Total: 9.11 km^{2} (3.52 sq mi)
- Elevation: 211 m (692 ft)

Population (2025)
  - Total: 111
- Time zone: UTC+1 (CET)
  - Summer (DST): UTC+2 (CEST)
- Postal code: 982 62
- Area code: +421 47
- Vehicle registration plate (until 2022): RA
- Website: www.rasice.sk

Rašice (Hungarian: Felsőrás) is a village and municipality in Revúca District in the Banská Bystrica Region of Slovakia.

== Geography ==
The municipality lies at an altitude of 211 metres (692 ft) and covers an area of 9.11 km^{2} (3.52 sq mi) (2025).

== Population ==
Population statistic (10 years)
Year	1995	2005	2015	2025
Count	146	132	114	111
Difference		−9.58%	−13.63%	−2.63%

Population statistic
Year	2024	2025
Count	112	111
Difference		−0.89%

It has a population of 111 people (31 December 2025).

=== Ethnicity ===
Census 2021 (1+ %)
Ethnicity	Number	Fraction
Hungarian	112	95.72%
Slovak	11	9.4%
Romani	3	2.56%
Total	117	

In year 2021 was 117 people by ethnicity 112 as Hungarian, 11 as Slovak, 3 as Romani and 1 as Not found out.

Note on population: The difference values of population numbers in the table "Population statistic" and in the sections "Ethnicity" & "Religion" is caused by the use of various statistical methods.

=== Religion ===
Census 2021 (1+ %)
Religion	Number	Fraction
Calvinist Church	73	62.39%
None	31	26.5%
Roman Catholic Church	11	9.4%
Total	117	

In year 2021 was 117 people by religion 73 from Calvinist Church, 31 from None, 11 from Roman Catholic Church, 1 from Paganism and natural spirituality and 1 from Evangelical Church.
