= Muránska Dlhá Lúka =

Muránska Dlhá Lúka Murányhosszúrét
- Municipality
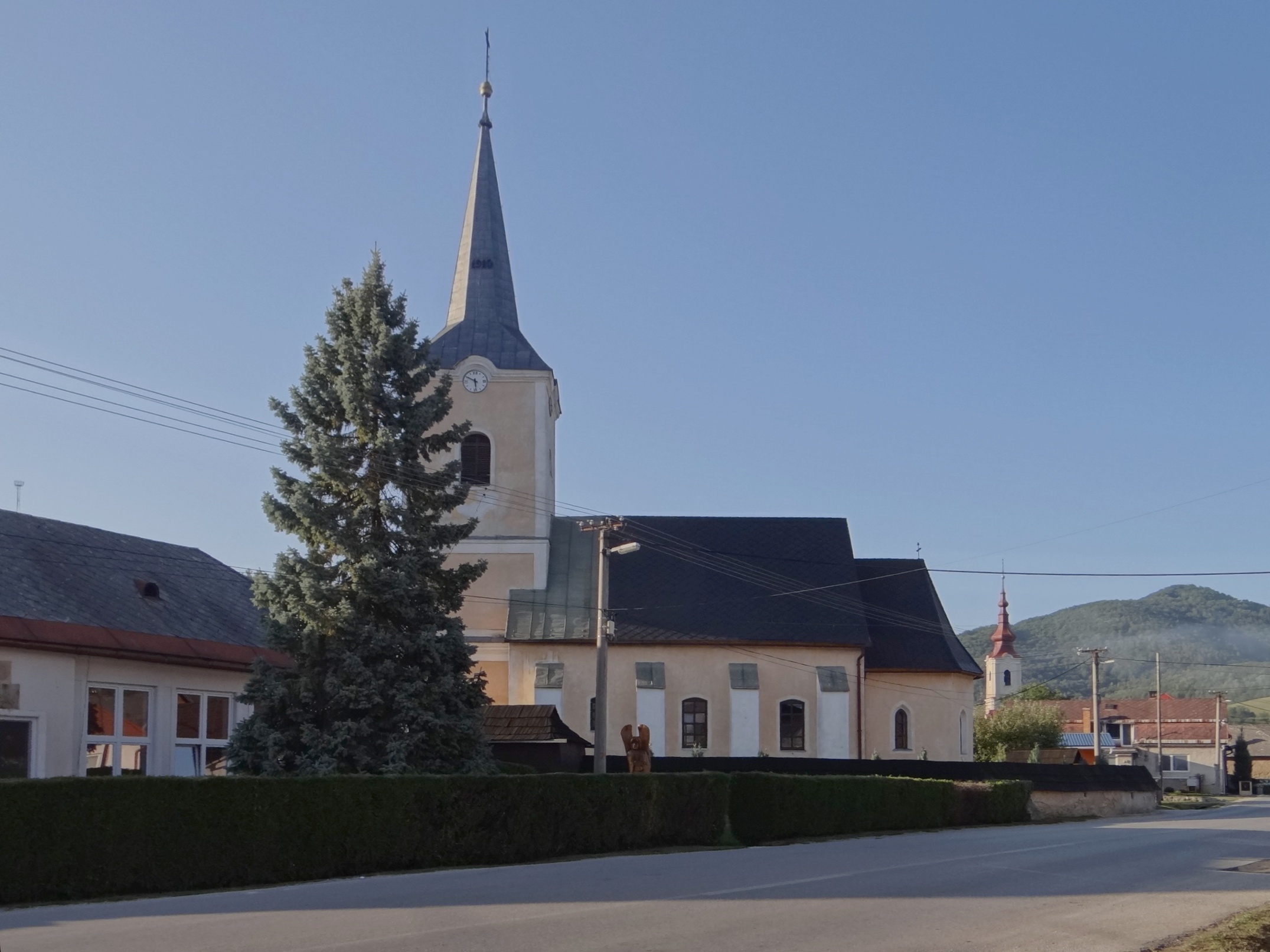

- Flag

- Location of Muránska Dlhá Lúka in the Banská Bystrica Region Location of Muránska Dlhá Lúka in Slovakia
- Coordinates: 48.72°N 20.08°E
- Country: Slovakia
- Region: Banská Bystrica Region
- District: Revúca District
- First mentioned: 1357

Government
  - Mayor: Ing.Marek Nosko

Area
  - Total: 18.65 km^{2} (7.20 sq mi)
- Elevation: 343 m (1,125 ft)

Population (2025)
  - Total: 943
- Time zone: UTC+1 (CET)
  - Summer (DST): UTC+2 (CEST)
- Postal code: 491 9
- Area code: +421 58
- Vehicle registration plate (until 2022): RA
- Website: www.muranskadlhaluka.sk

Muránska Dlhá Lúka (Hungarian: Murányhosszúrét) is a village and municipality in Revúca District in the Banská Bystrica Region of Slovakia.

== Geography ==
The municipality lies at an altitude of 343 metres (1,125 ft) and covers an area of 18.65 km^{2} (7.20 sq mi) (2025).

== Population ==
Population statistic (10 years)
Year	1995	2005	2015	2025
Count	722	805	897	943
Difference		+11.49%	+11.42%	+5.12%

Population statistic
Year	2024	2025
Count	938	943
Difference		+0.53%

It has a population of 943 people (31 December 2025).

=== Ethnicity ===
Census 2021 (1+ %)
Ethnicity	Number	Fraction
Slovak	840	91.5%
Romani	156	16.99%
Not found out	58	6.31%
Total	918	

In year 2021 was 918 people by ethnicity 840 as Slovak, 156 as Romani, 58 as Not found out, 9 as Hungarian, 4 as Russian, 2 as Czech, 2 as German and 1 as Other.

Note on population: The difference values of population numbers in the table "Population statistic" and in the sections "Ethnicity" & "Religion" is caused by the use of various statistical methods.

=== Religion ===
Census 2021 (1+ %)
Religion	Number	Fraction
Roman Catholic Church	557	60.68%
Evangelical Church	177	19.28%
None	113	12.31%
Not found out	56	6.1%
Total	918	

In year 2021 was 918 people by religion 557 from Roman Catholic Church, 177 from Evangelical Church, 113 from None, 56 from Not found out, 8 from Baptists Church, 5 from Greek Catholic Church, 1 from Buddhism and 1 from Apostolic Church.
