= Mokrá Lúka =

Mokrá Lúka Vizesrét
- Municipality
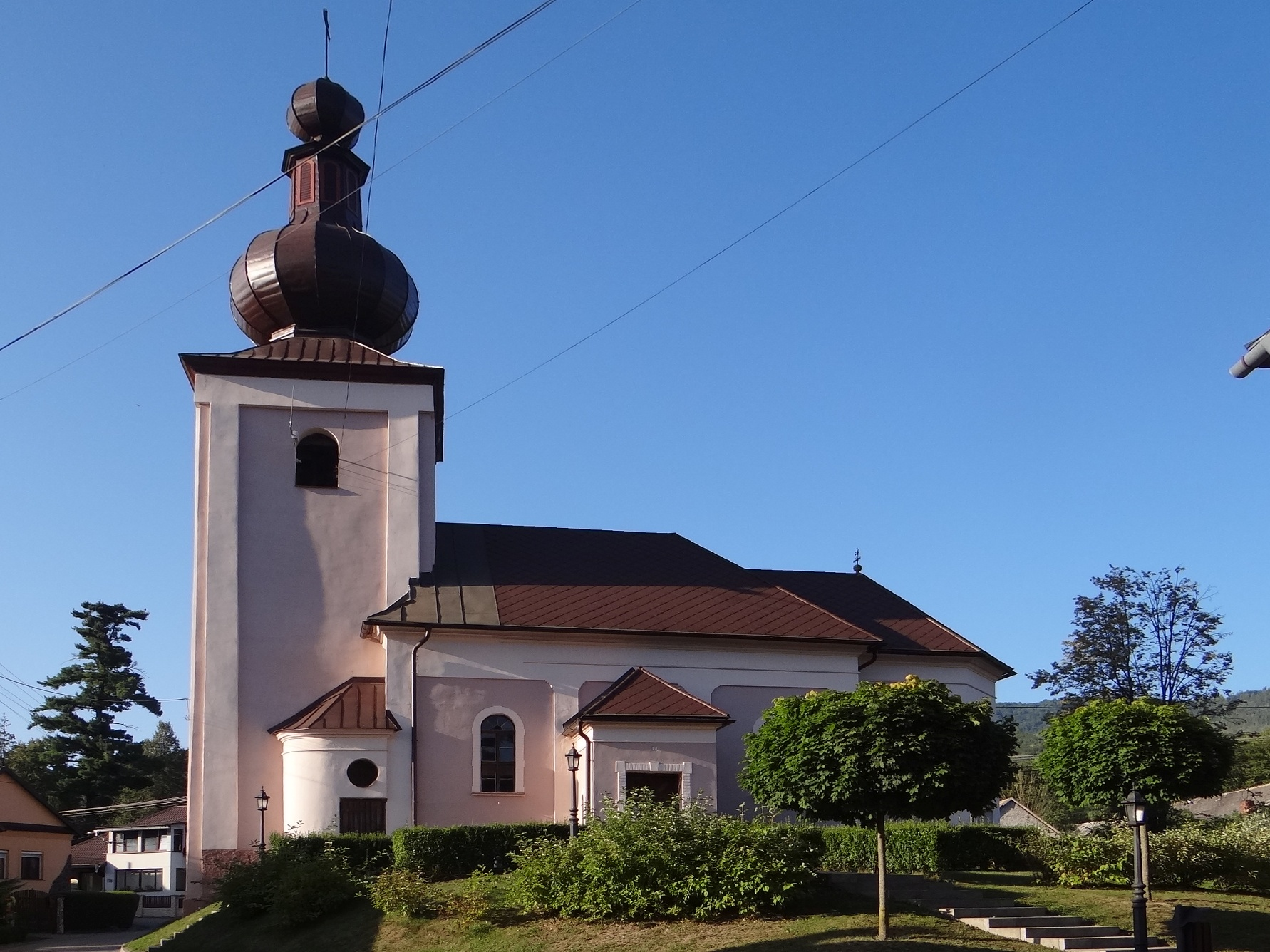

- Flag

- Location of Mokrá Lúka in the Banská Bystrica Region Location of Mokrá Lúka in Slovakia
- Coordinates: 48.67°N 20.15°E
- Country: Slovakia
- Region: Banská Bystrica Region
- District: Revúca District
- First mentioned: 1427

Area
  - Total: 15.20 km^{2} (5.87 sq mi)
- Elevation: 292 m (958 ft)

Population (2025)
  - Total: 544
- Time zone: UTC+1 (CET)
  - Summer (DST): UTC+2 (CEST)
- Postal code: 500 1
- Area code: +421 58
- Vehicle registration plate (until 2022): RA
- Website: mokraluka.eu

Mokrá Lúka (Hungarian: Vizesrét) is a village and municipality in Revúca District in the Banská Bystrica Region of Slovakia.

== Geography ==
The municipality lies at an altitude of 292 metres (958 ft) and covers an area of 15.20 km^{2} (5.87 sq mi) (2025).

== Population ==
Population statistic (10 years)
Year	1995	2005	2015	2025
Count	461	540	505	544
Difference		+17.13%	−6.48%	+7.72%

Population statistic
Year	2024	2025
Count	545	544
Difference		−0.18%

It has a population of 544 people (31 December 2025).

=== Ethnicity ===
Census 2021 (1+ %)
Ethnicity	Number	Fraction
Slovak	483	89.44%
Not found out	51	9.44%
Czech	6	1.11%
Total	540	

In year 2021 was 540 people by ethnicity 483 as Slovak, 51 as Not found out, 6 as Czech, 5 as Romani, 3 as Hungarian and 1 as Ukrainian.

Note on population: The difference values of population numbers in the table "Population statistic" and in the sections "Ethnicity" & "Religion" is caused by the use of various statistical methods.

=== Religion ===
Census 2021 (1+ %)
Religion	Number	Fraction
None	233	43.15%
Roman Catholic Church	116	21.48%
Evangelical Church	114	21.11%
Not found out	52	9.63%
Greek Catholic Church	9	1.67%
Baptists Church	8	1.48%
Total	540	

In year 2021 was 540 people by religion 233 from None, 116 from Roman Catholic Church, 114 from Evangelical Church, 52 from Not found out, 9 from Greek Catholic Church, 8 from Baptists Church, 2 from Calvinist Church, 2 from Ad hoc movements, 1 from Eastern Orthodox Church, 1 from Paganism and natural spirituality, 1 from Islam and 1 from Other.
