= Turčok =

Municipality of Slovakia

Turčok Turcsok
- Municipality
- Flag

- Location of Turčok in the Banská Bystrica Region Location of Turčok in Slovakia
- Coordinates: 48.63°N 20.15°E
- Country: Slovakia
- Region: Banská Bystrica Region
- District: Revúca District
- First mentioned: 1427

Area
  - Total: 14.78 km^{2} (5.71 sq mi)
- Elevation: 336 m (1,102 ft)

Population (2025)
  - Total: 278
- Time zone: UTC+1 (CET)
  - Summer (DST): UTC+2 (CEST)
- Postal code: 496 6
- Area code: +421 58
- Vehicle registration plate (until 2022): RA
- Website: www.obec-turcok.sk

Turčok (Hungarian: Turcsok) is a village and municipality in Revúca District in the Banská Bystrica Region of Slovakia.

== Geography ==
The municipality lies at an altitude of 336 metres (1,102 ft) and covers an area of 14.78 km^{2} (5.71 sq mi) (2025).

== Population ==
Population statistic (10 years)
Year	1995	2005	2015	2025
Count	238	243	279	278
Difference		+2.10%	+14.81%	−0.35%

Population statistic
Year	2024	2025
Count	278	278
Difference		+0%

It has a population of 278 people (31 December 2025).

=== Ethnicity ===
Census 2021 (1+ %)
Ethnicity	Number	Fraction
Slovak	272	94.77%
Not found out	14	4.87%
Hungarian	4	1.39%
Romani	3	1.04%
Total	287	

In year 2021 was 287 people by ethnicity 272 as Slovak, 14 as Not found out, 4 as Hungarian and 3 as Romani.

Note on population: The difference values of population numbers in the table "Population statistic" and in the sections "Ethnicity" & "Religion" is caused by the use of various statistical methods.

=== Religion ===
Census 2021 (1+ %)
Religion	Number	Fraction
None	212	73.87%
Roman Catholic Church	33	11.5%
Evangelical Church	27	9.41%
Not found out	10	3.48%
Total	287	

In year 2021 was 287 people by religion 212 from None, 33 from Roman Catholic Church, 27 from Evangelical Church, 10 from Not found out, 2 from Jehovah's Witnesses, 2 from Ad hoc movements and 1 from Greek Catholic Church.
