= Leváre =

Leváre Lévárt
- Municipality
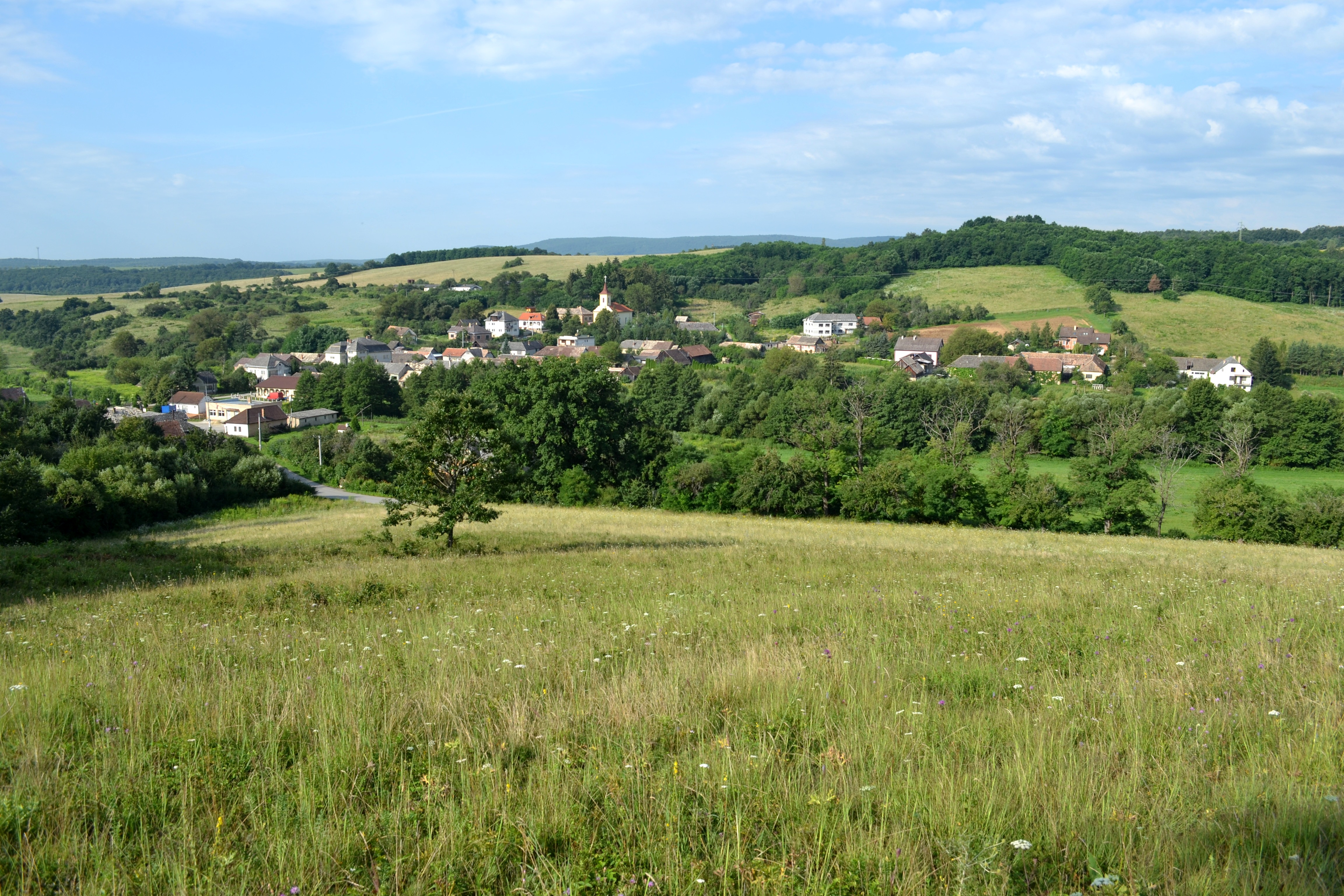

- Flag

- Location of Leváre in the Banská Bystrica Region Location of Leváre in Slovakia
- Coordinates: 48.52°N 20.25°E
- Country: Slovakia
- Region: Banská Bystrica Region
- District: Revúca District
- First mentioned: 1427

Area
  - Total: 7.45 km^{2} (2.88 sq mi)
- Elevation: 207 m (679 ft)

Population (2025)
  - Total: 76
- Time zone: UTC+1 (CET)
  - Summer (DST): UTC+2 (CEST)
- Postal code: 982 62
- Area code: +421 47
- Vehicle registration plate (until 2022): RA
- Website: www.obeclevare.sk

Levare (Hungarian: Lévárt) is a village and municipality in Revúca District in the Banská Bystrica Region of Slovakia.

== Geography ==
The municipality lies at an altitude of 207 metres (679 ft) and covers an area of 7.45 km^{2} (2.88 sq mi) (2025).

== Population ==
Population statistic (10 years)
| Year | 1995 | 2005 | 2015 | 2025 |
|---|---|---|---|---|
| Count | 103 | 109 | 90 | 76 |
| Difference | | +5.82% | −17.43% | −15.55% |

Population statistic
| Year | 2024 | 2025 |
|---|---|---|
| Count | 77 | 76 |
| Difference | | −1.29% |

It has a population of 76 people (31 December 2025).

=== Ethnicity ===
Census 2021 (1+ %)
| Ethnicity | Number | Fraction |
|---|---|---|
| Hungarian | 68 | 85% |
| Slovak | 7 | 8.75% |
| Not found out | 5 | 6.25% |
| Czech | 2 | 2.5% |
| Romani | 2 | 2.5% |
| Total | 80 | |

In year 2021 was 80 people by ethnicity 68 as Hungarian, 7 as Slovak, 5 as Not found out, 2 as Czech and 2 as Romani.

Note on population: The difference values of population numbers in the table "Population statistic" and in the sections "Ethnicity" & "Religion" is caused by the use of various statistical methods.

=== Religion ===
Census 2021 (1+ %)
| Religion | Number | Fraction |
|---|---|---|
| Roman Catholic Church | 69 | 86.25% |
| Jehovah's Witnesses | 4 | 5% |
| Calvinist Church | 3 | 3.75% |
| Not found out | 3 | 3.75% |
| None | 1 | 1.25% |
| Total | 80 | |

In year 2021 was 80 people by religion 69 from Roman Catholic Church, 4 from Jehovah's Witnesses, 3 from Calvinist Church, 3 from Not found out and 1 from None.
