= Magnezitovce =

Magnezitovce Baráttelke
- Municipality
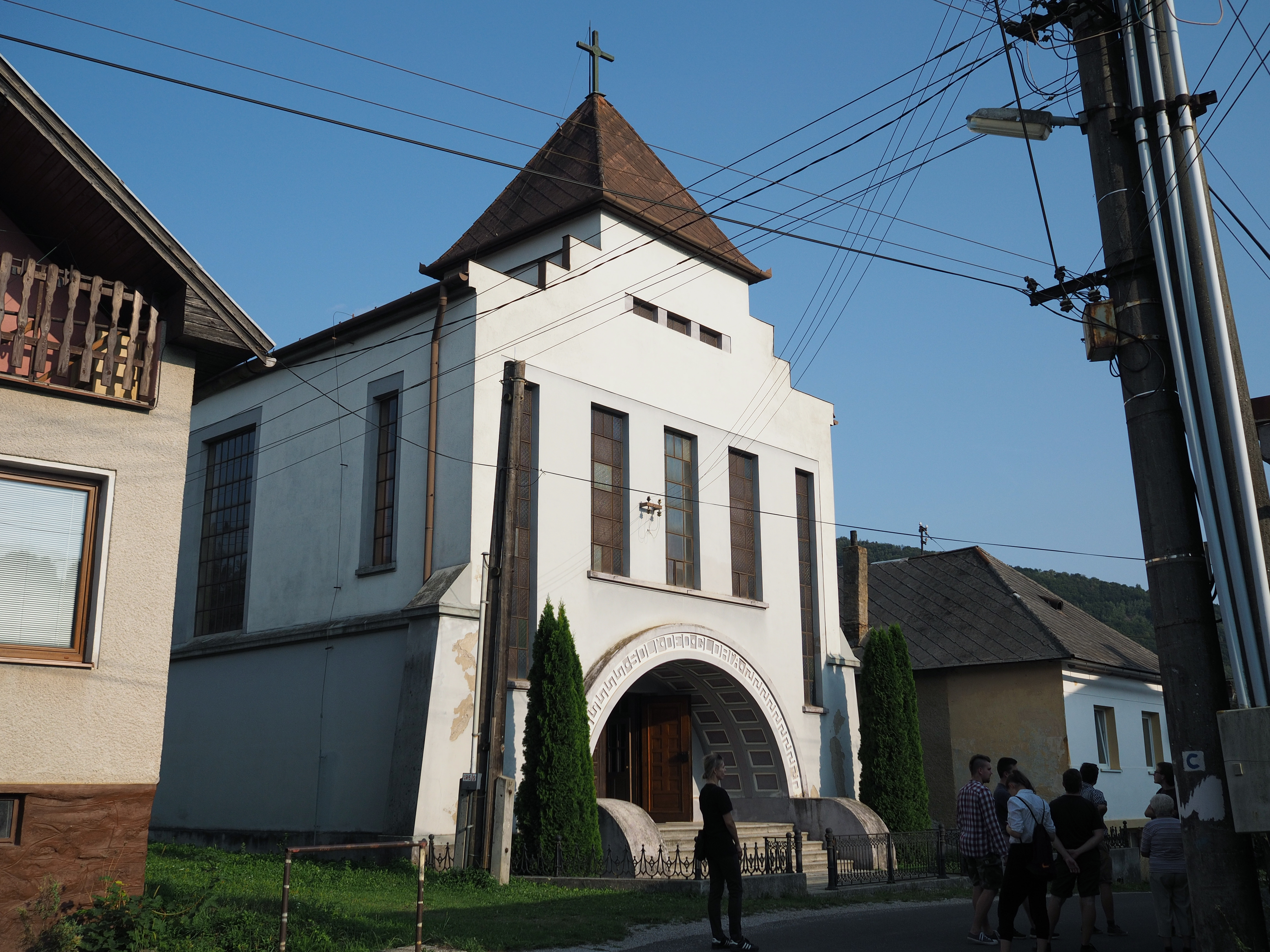

- Flag

- Location of Magnezitovce in the Banská Bystrica Region Location of Magnezitovce in Slovakia
- Coordinates: 48.67°N 20.23°E
- Country: Slovakia
- Region: Banská Bystrica Region
- District: Revúca District
- First mentioned: 1427

Area
  - Total: 15.19 km^{2} (5.86 sq mi)
- Elevation: 346 m (1,135 ft)

Population (2025)
  - Total: 432
- Time zone: UTC+1 (CET)
  - Summer (DST): UTC+2 (CEST)
- Postal code: 491 6
- Area code: +421 58
- Vehicle registration plate (until 2022): RA
- Website: www.magnezitovce.sk

Magnezitovce (Hungarian: Baráttelke) is a village and municipality in Revúca District in the Banská Bystrica Region of Slovakia.

== Geography ==
The municipality lies at an altitude of 346 metres (1,135 ft) and covers an area of 15.19 km^{2} (5.86 sq mi) (2025).

== Population ==
Population statistic (10 years)
Year	1995	2005	2015	2025
Count	432	431	471	432
Difference		−0.23%	+9.28%	−8.28%

Population statistic
Year	2024	2025
Count	438	432
Difference		−1.36%

It has a population of 432 people (31 December 2025).

=== Ethnicity ===
Census 2021 (1+ %)
Ethnicity	Number	Fraction
Slovak	444	97.58%
Not found out	10	2.19%
Romani	8	1.75%
Total	455	

In year 2021 was 455 people by ethnicity 444 as Slovak, 10 as Not found out, 8 as Romani and 1 as Czech.

Note on population: The difference values of population numbers in the table "Population statistic" and in the sections "Ethnicity" & "Religion" is caused by the use of various statistical methods.

=== Religion ===
Census 2021 (1+ %)
Religion	Number	Fraction
None	334	73.41%
Evangelical Church	61	13.41%
Roman Catholic Church	37	8.13%
Not found out	9	1.98%
Greek Catholic Church	5	1.1%
Total	455	

In year 2021 was 455 people by religion 334 from None, 61 from Evangelical Church, 37 from Roman Catholic Church, 9 from Not found out, 5 from Greek Catholic Church, 3 from Christian Congregations in Slovakia, 3 from United Methodist Church, 1 from Calvinist Church, 1 from Other and not ascertained christian church and 1 from Jehovah's Witnesses.
