= Prihradzany =

Prihradzany Kisperlász
- Municipality
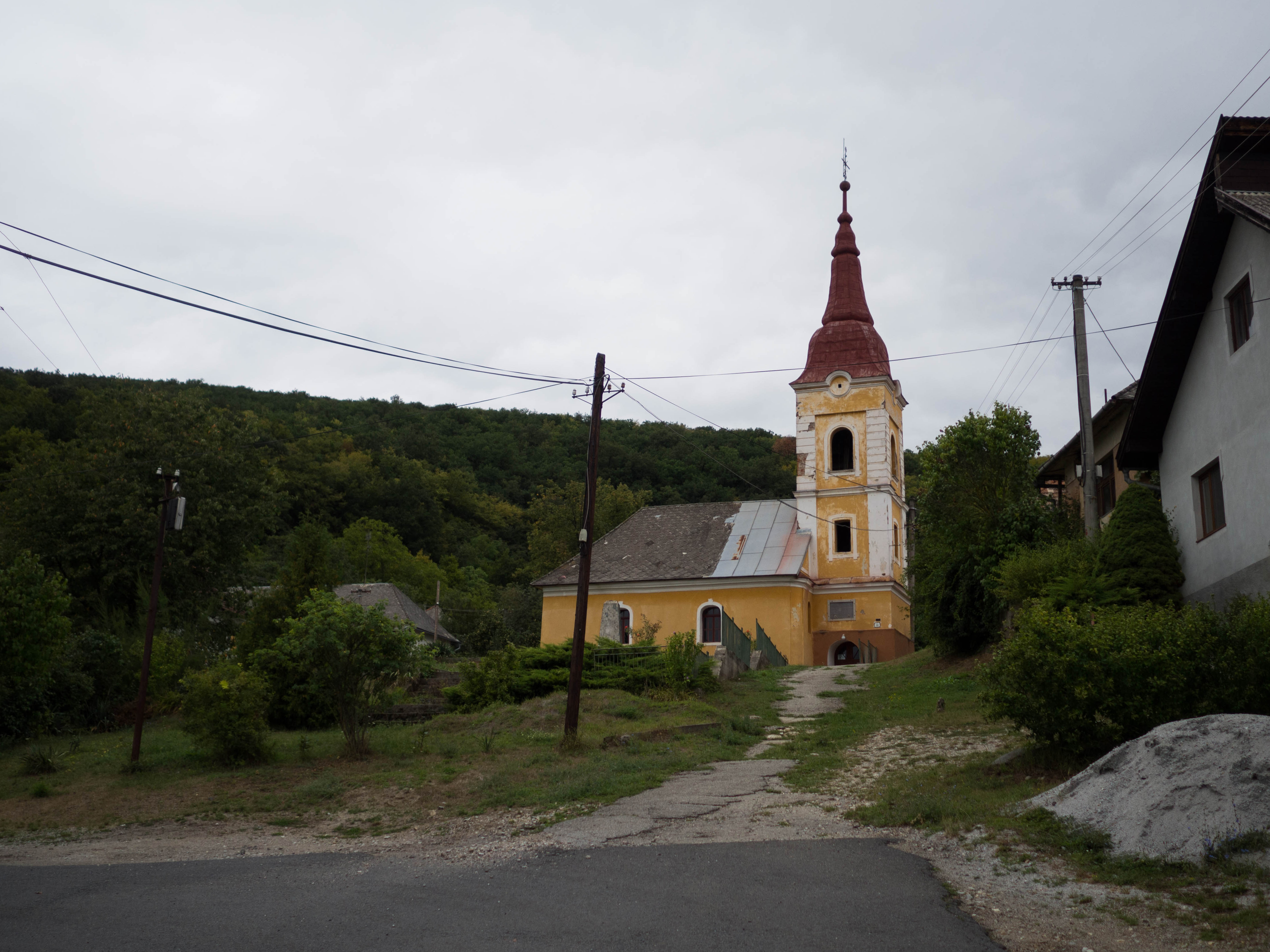
- Lutheran Church in Prihradzany

- Flag

- Location of Prihradzany in the Banská Bystrica Region Location of Prihradzany in Slovakia
- Coordinates: 48.58°N 20.24°E
- Country: Slovakia
- Region: Banská Bystrica Region
- District: Revúca District
- First mentioned: 1262

Area
  - Total: 4.55 km^{2} (1.76 sq mi)
- Elevation: 260 m (850 ft)

Population (2025)
  - Total: 70
- Time zone: UTC+1 (CET)
  - Summer (DST): UTC+2 (CEST)
- Postal code: 491 4
- Area code: +421 58
- Vehicle registration plate (until 2022): RA
- Website: www.prihradzany.sk

Prihradzany (Hungarian: Kisperlász) is a village and municipality in Revúca District in the Banská Bystrica Region of Slovakia. Before the First World War it belonged to Hungary for 1000 years. Its name is Kisperlász in Hungarian

== Geography ==
The municipality lies at an altitude of 260 metres (850 ft) and covers an area of 4.55 km^{2} (1.76 sq mi) (2025).

== Sightseeing ==
In the cemetery stands the old rotunda named St. Anna. It had been built in the 11th-12th century in the Árpád age. Its diameter is 9 meters.

== Population ==
Population statistic (10 years)
Year	1995	2005	2015	2025
Count	94	78	85	70
Difference		−17.02%	+8.97%	−17.64%

Population statistic
Year	2024	2025
Count	66	70
Difference		+6.06%

It has a population of 70 people (31 December 2025).

=== Ethnicity ===
Census 2021 (1+ %)
Ethnicity	Number	Fraction
Slovak	72	98.63%
Not found out	1	1.36%
Total	73	

In year 2021 was 73 people by ethnicity 72 as Slovak and 1 as Not found out.

Note on population: The difference values of population numbers in the table "Population statistic" and in the sections "Ethnicity" & "Religion" is caused by the use of various statistical methods.

=== Religion ===
Census 2021 (1+ %)
Religion	Number	Fraction
Evangelical Church	31	42.47%
None	25	34.25%
Roman Catholic Church	13	17.81%
Greek Catholic Church	2	2.74%
Not found out	1	1.37%
Islam	1	1.37%
Total	73	

In year 2021 was 73 people by religion 31 from Evangelical Church, 25 from None, 13 from Roman Catholic Church, 2 from Greek Catholic Church, 1 from Not found out and 1 from Islam.
