= Rybník, Revúca District =

Rybník Újvásár
- Municipality
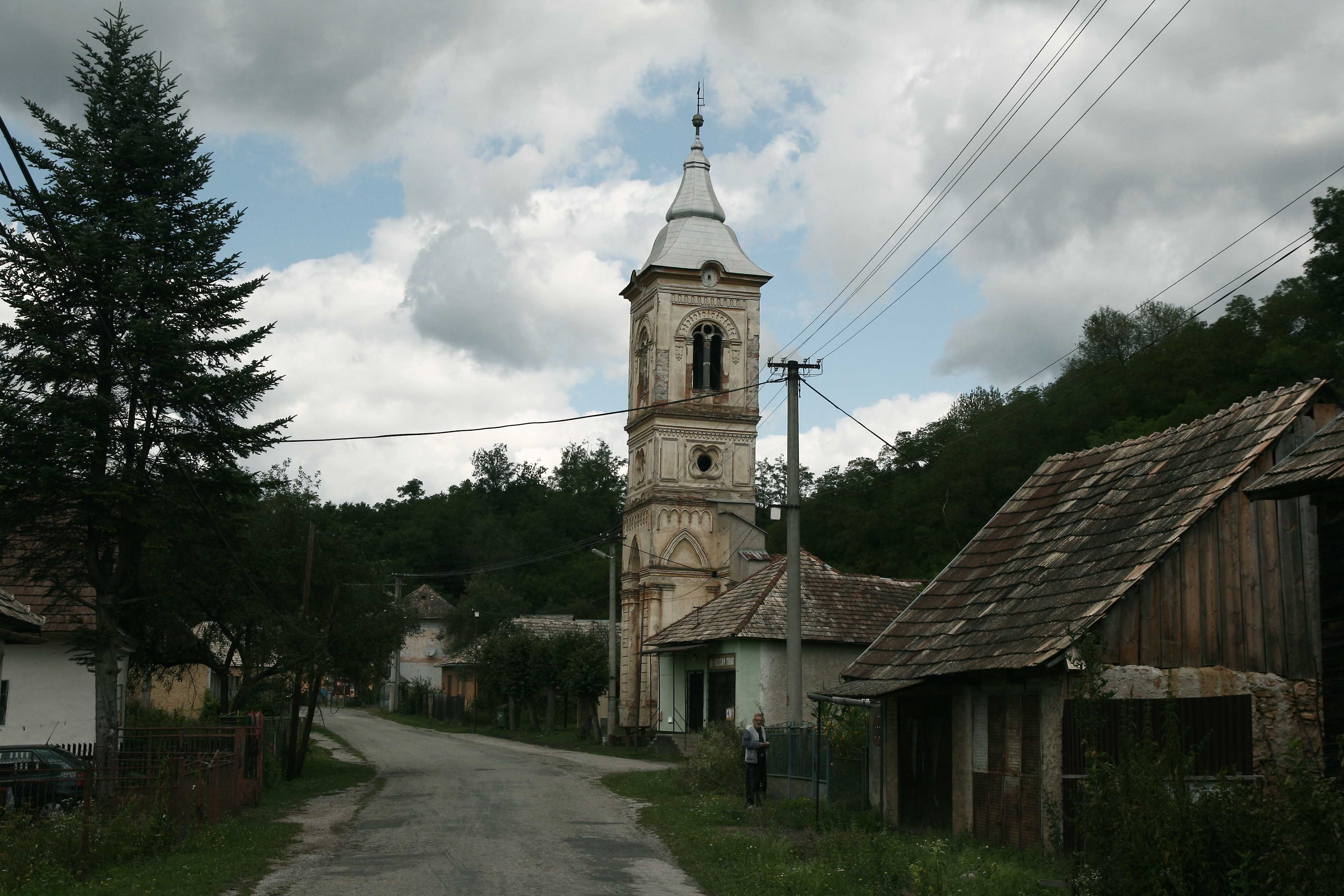

- Flag

- Location of Rybník in the Banská Bystrica Region Location of Rybník in Slovakia
- Coordinates: 48°33′00″N 20°07′30″E
- Country: Slovakia
- Region: Banská Bystrica Region
- District: Revúca District
- First mentioned: 1266

Area
  - Total: 16.95 km^{2} (6.54 sq mi)
- Elevation: 260 m (850 ft)

Population (2025)
  - Total: 150
- Time zone: UTC+1 (CET)
  - Summer (DST): UTC+2 (CEST)
- Postal code: 982 64
- Area code: +421 47
- Vehicle registration plate (until 2022): RA

Rybník (Hungarian: Újvásár) is a village and municipality in Revúca District in the Banská Bystrica Region of Slovakia.

== Population ==
Population statistic (10 years)
Year	1995	2005	2015	2025
Count	122	160	155	150
Difference		+31.14%	−3.12%	−3.22%

Population statistic
Year	2024	2025
Count	146	150
Difference		+2.73%

It has a population of 150 people (31 December 2025).

=== Ethnicity ===
Census 2021 (1+ %)
Ethnicity	Number	Fraction
Slovak	149	94.3%
Not found out	13	8.22%
Hungarian	2	1.26%
Total	158	

In year 2021 was 158 people by ethnicity 149 as Slovak, 13 as Not found out, 2 as Hungarian, 1 as Romani and 1 as English.

Note on population: The difference values of population numbers in the table "Population statistic" and in the sections "Ethnicity" & "Religion" is caused by the use of various statistical methods.

The vast majority of the municipality's population consists of the local Roma community. In 2019, they constituted an estimated 88% of the local population.

=== Religion ===
Census 2021 (1+ %)
Religion	Number	Fraction
Roman Catholic Church	107	67.72%
None	27	17.09%
Evangelical Church	16	10.13%
Not found out	7	4.43%
Total	158	

In year 2021 was 158 people by religion 107 from Roman Catholic Church, 27 from None, 16 from Evangelical Church, 7 from Not found out and 1 from United Methodist Church.
