= Hrlica =

Hrlica Gerlice
- Municipality
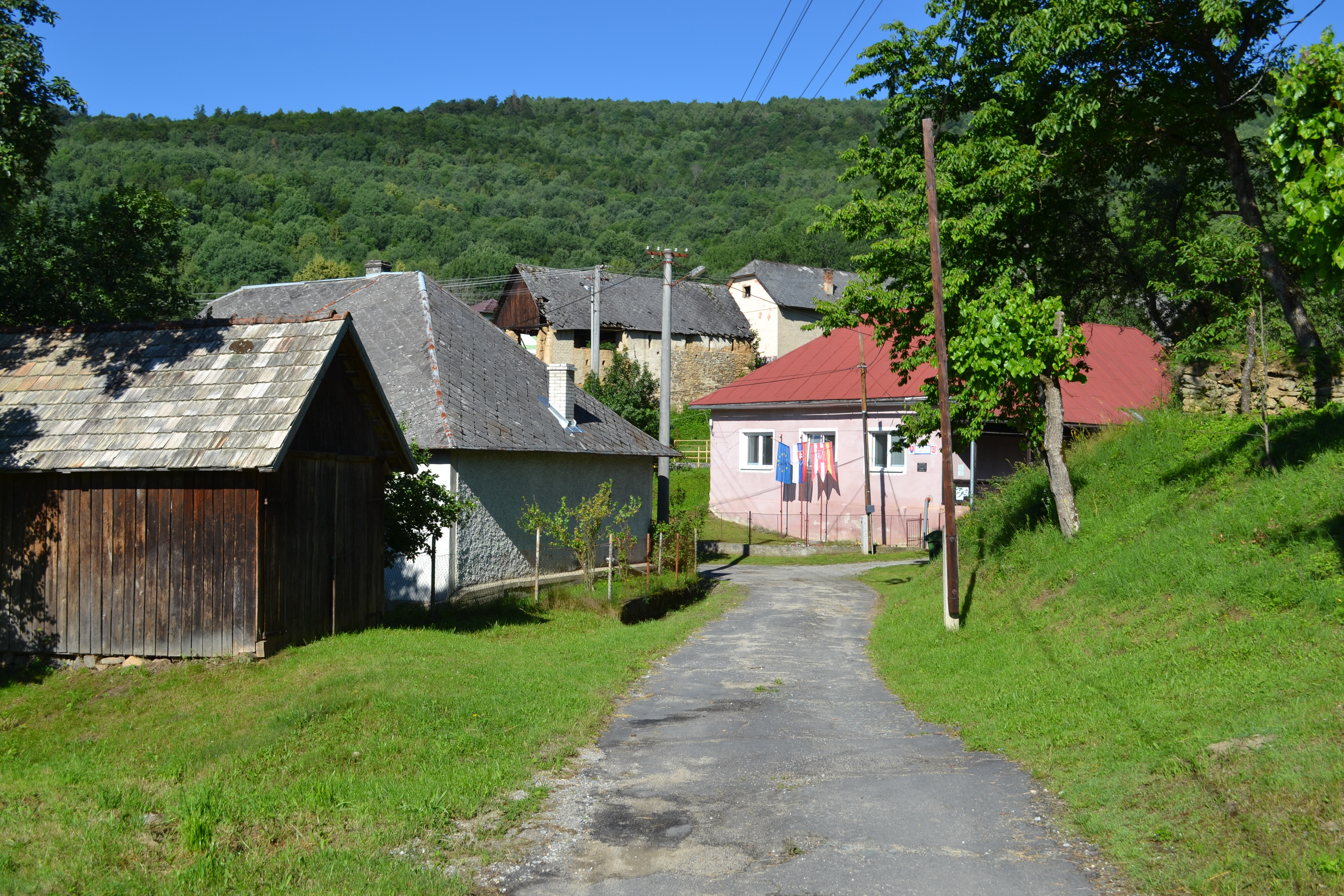

- Flag

- Location of Hrlica in the Banská Bystrica Region Location of Hrlica in Slovakia
- Coordinates: 48.63°N 20.05°E
- Country: Slovakia
- Region: Banská Bystrica Region
- District: Revúca District
- First mentioned: 1413

Area
  - Total: 5.49 km^{2} (2.12 sq mi)
- Elevation: 439 m (1,440 ft)

Population (2025)
  - Total: 54
- Time zone: UTC+1 (CET)
  - Summer (DST): UTC+2 (CEST)
- Postal code: 982 66
- Area code: +421 47
- Vehicle registration plate (until 2022): RA

Hrlica (Hungarian: Gerlice) is a village and municipality in Revúca District in the Banská Bystrica Region of Slovakia.

== Geography ==
The municipality lies at an altitude of 439 metres (1,440 ft) and covers an area of 5.49 km^{2} (2.12 sq mi) (2025).

== History ==
In historical records, the village was first mentioned in 1413 (Gerlyche), when it belonged to Derencsénny feudatories. In the 17th century it passed tu Muráň.

== Population ==
Population statistic (10 years)
Year	1995	2005	2015	2025
Count	93	77	81	54
Difference		−17.20%	+5.19%	−33.33%

Population statistic
Year	2024	2025
Count	55	54
Difference		−1.81%

It has a population of 54 people (31 December 2025).

=== Ethnicity ===
Census 2021 (1+ %)
Ethnicity	Number	Fraction
Slovak	53	94.64%
Not found out	2	3.57%
Czech	1	1.78%
Total	56	

In year 2021 was 56 people by ethnicity 53 as Slovak, 2 as Not found out and 1 as Czech.

Note on population: The difference values of population numbers in the table "Population statistic" and in the sections "Ethnicity" & "Religion" is caused by the use of various statistical methods.

=== Religion ===
Census 2021 (1+ %)
Religion	Number	Fraction
Evangelical Church	23	41.07%
None	21	37.5%
Roman Catholic Church	10	17.86%
Not found out	2	3.57%
Total	56	

In year 2021 was 56 people by religion 23 from Evangelical Church, 21 from None, 10 from Roman Catholic Church and 2 from Not found out.

== Genealogical resources ==
The records for genealogical research are available at the state archive "Statny Archiv in Banska Bystrica, Slovakia"

- Roman Catholic church records (births/marriages/deaths): 1810-1896 (parish B)
- Lutheran church records (births/marriages/deaths): 1730-1895 (parish B)

== See also ==
- List of municipalities and towns in Slovakia
