= Lubeník =

Lubeník Lubény
- Municipality
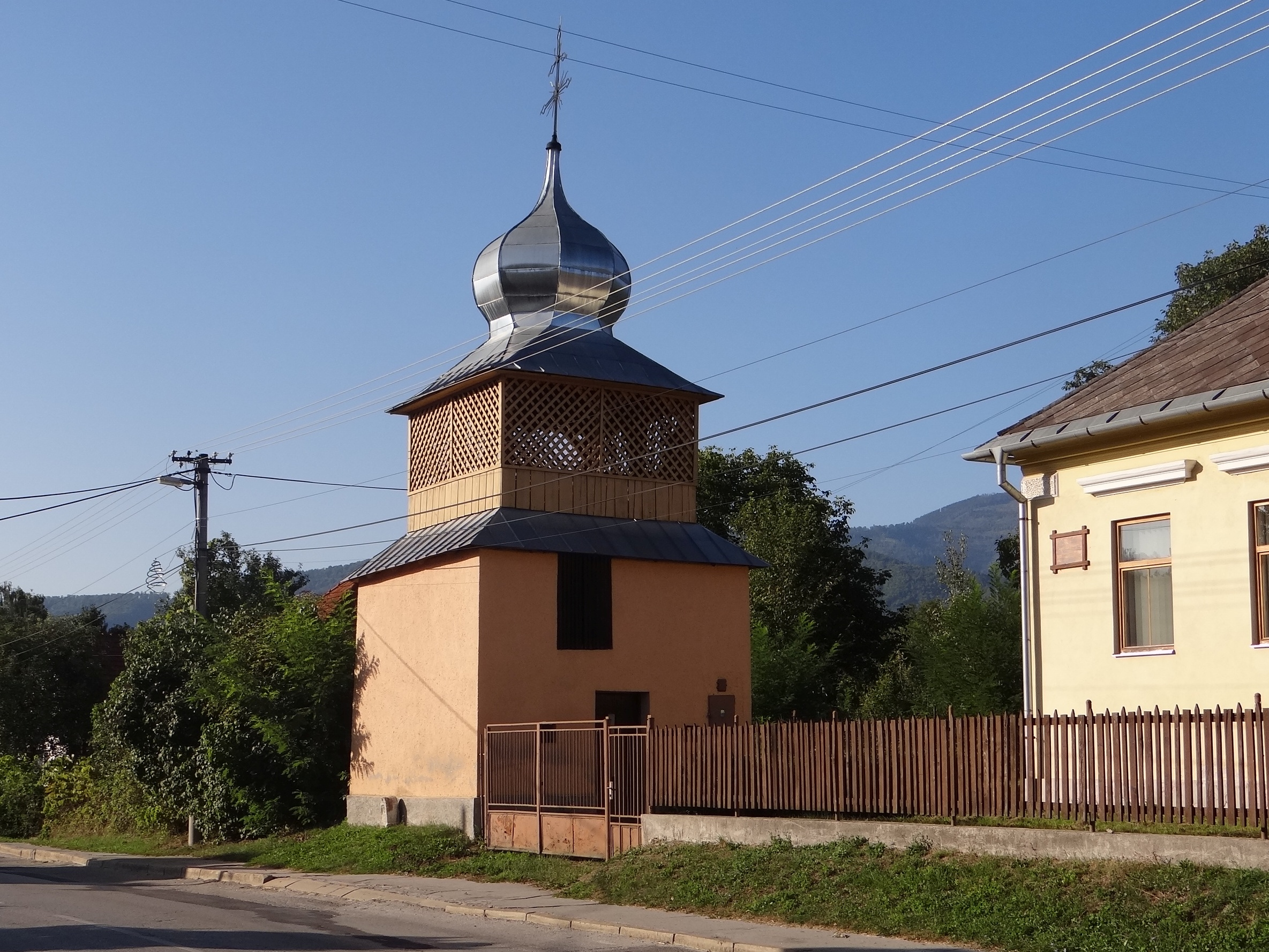

- Flag Coat of arms

- Location of Lubeník in the Banská Bystrica Region Location of Lubeník in Slovakia
- Coordinates: 48.67°N 20.20°E
- Country: Slovakia
- Region: Banská Bystrica Region
- District: Revúca District
- First mentioned: 1427

Area
  - Total: 5.81 km^{2} (2.24 sq mi)
- Elevation: 274 m (899 ft)

Population (2025)
  - Total: 1,251
- Time zone: UTC+1 (CET)
  - Summer (DST): UTC+2 (CEST)
- Postal code: 491 8
- Area code: +421 58
- Vehicle registration plate (until 2022): RA
- Website: www.obeclubenik.sk

Lubeník (Hungarian: Lubény) is a village and municipality in Revúca District in the Banská Bystrica Region of Slovakia.

== Geography ==
The municipality lies at an altitude of 274 metres (899 ft) and covers an area of 5.81 km^{2} (2.24 sq mi) (2025).

== Population ==
Population statistic (10 years)
Year	1995	2005	2015	2025
Count	1252	1267	1318	1251
Difference		+1.19%	+4.02%	−5.08%

Population statistic
Year	2024	2025
Count	1254	1251
Difference		−0.23%

It has a population of 1251 people (31 December 2025).

=== Ethnicity ===
Census 2021 (1+ %)
Ethnicity	Number	Fraction
Slovak	1122	89.26%
Romani	139	11.05%
Not found out	95	7.55%
Hungarian	28	2.22%
Total	1257	

In year 2021 was 1257 people by ethnicity 1122 as Slovak, 139 as Romani, 95 as Not found out, 28 as Hungarian, 6 as Other, 5 as Czech, 5 as Italian, 4 as Ukrainian, 2 as German, 1 as Jewish, 1 as Polish and 1 as Bulgarian.

Note on population: The difference values of population numbers in the table "Population statistic" and in the sections "Ethnicity" & "Religion" is caused by the use of various statistical methods.

=== Religion ===
Census 2021 (1+ %)
Religion	Number	Fraction
None	727	57.84%
Roman Catholic Church	230	18.3%
Evangelical Church	151	12.01%
Not found out	102	8.11%
Jehovah's Witnesses	18	1.43%
Greek Catholic Church	14	1.11%
Total	1257	

In year 2021 was 1257 people by religion 727 from None, 230 from Roman Catholic Church, 151 from Evangelical Church, 102 from Not found out, 18 from Jehovah's Witnesses, 14 from Greek Catholic Church, 4 from Other, 3 from Paganism and natural spirituality, 2 from Eastern Orthodox Church, 2 from Baptists Church, 1 from Calvinist Church, 1 from Other and not ascertained christian church, 1 from Church of the Brethren and 1 from Ad hoc movements.
