= Višňové, Revúca District =

Višňové Kisvisnyó
- Municipality
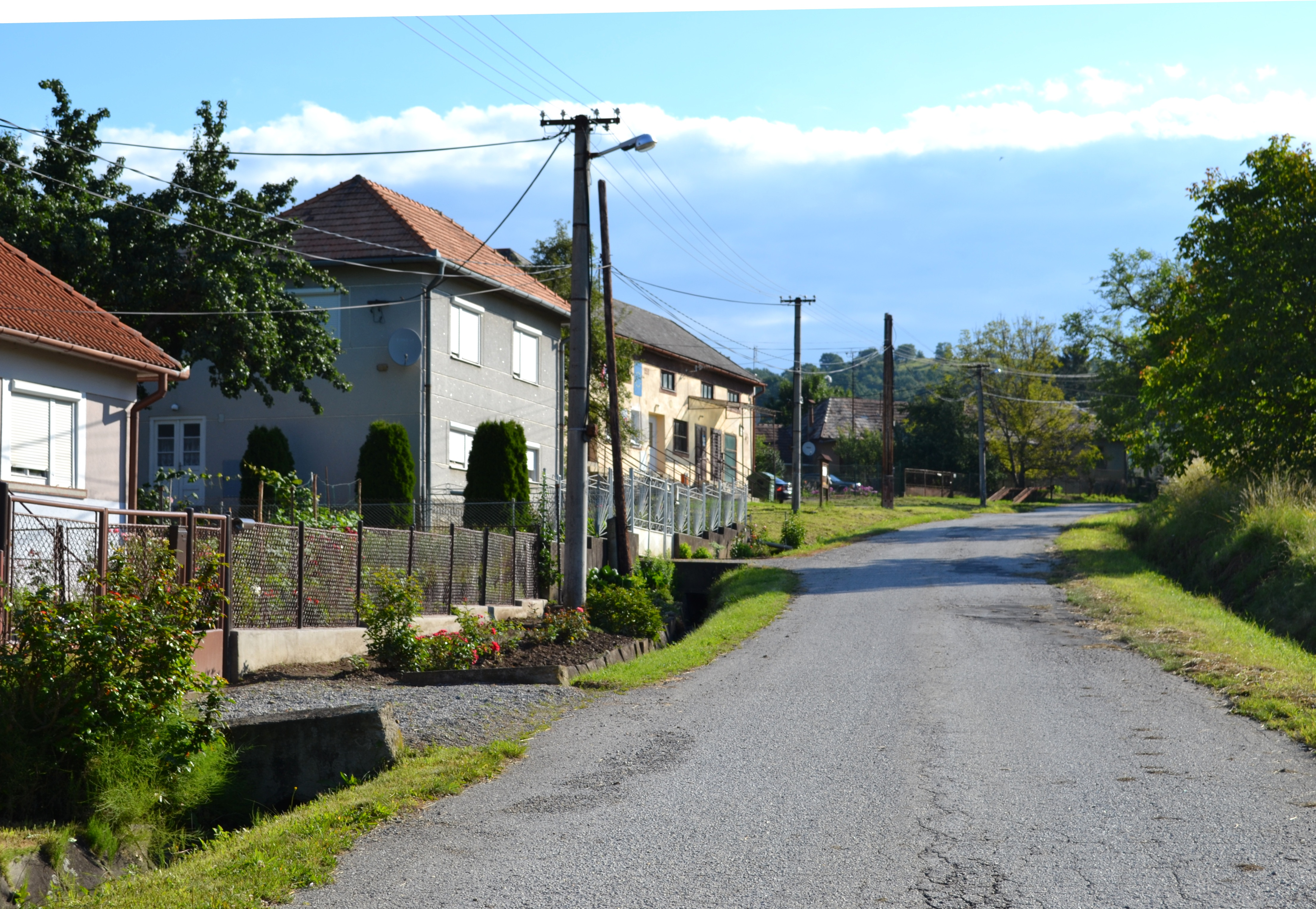

- Flag

- Location of Višňové in the Banská Bystrica Region Location of Višňové in Slovakia
- Coordinates: 48°31′00″N 20°11′22″E
- Country: Slovakia
- Region: Banská Bystrica Region
- District: Revúca District
- First mentioned: 1296

Area
  - Total: 8.29 km^{2} (3.20 sq mi)
- Elevation: 252 m (827 ft)

Population (2025)
  - Total: 64
- Time zone: UTC+1 (CET)
  - Summer (DST): UTC+2 (CEST)
- Postal code: 982 63
- Area code: +421 47
- Vehicle registration plate (until 2022): RA
- Website: www.obec-visnove.sk

Višňové (Hungarian: Kisvisnyó) is a village and municipality in Revúca District in the Banská Bystrica Region. It is present in central southern Slovakia.

== Population ==
Population statistic (10 years)
Year	1995	2005	2015	2025
Count	54	63	62	64
Difference		+16.66%	−1.58%	+3.22%

Population statistic
Year	2024	2025
Count	61	64
Difference		+4.91%

It has a population of 64 people (31 December 2025).

=== Ethnicity ===
Census 2021 (1+ %)
Ethnicity	Number	Fraction
Slovak	31	52.54%
Hungarian	29	49.15%
Romani	4	6.77%
Total	59	

In year 2021 was 59 people by ethnicity 31 as Slovak, 29 as Hungarian and 4 as Romani.

Note on population: The difference values of population numbers in the table "Population statistic" and in the sections "Ethnicity" & "Religion" is caused by the use of various statistical methods.

=== Religion ===
Census 2021 (1+ %)
Religion	Number	Fraction
Roman Catholic Church	33	55.93%
None	14	23.73%
Calvinist Church	11	18.64%
Evangelical Church	1	1.69%
Total	59	

In year 2021 was 59 people by religion 33 from Roman Catholic Church, 14 from None, 11 from Calvinist Church and 1 from Evangelical Church.
