= Revúca District =

Coordinates: 48°41′1″N 20°6′52″E

- District
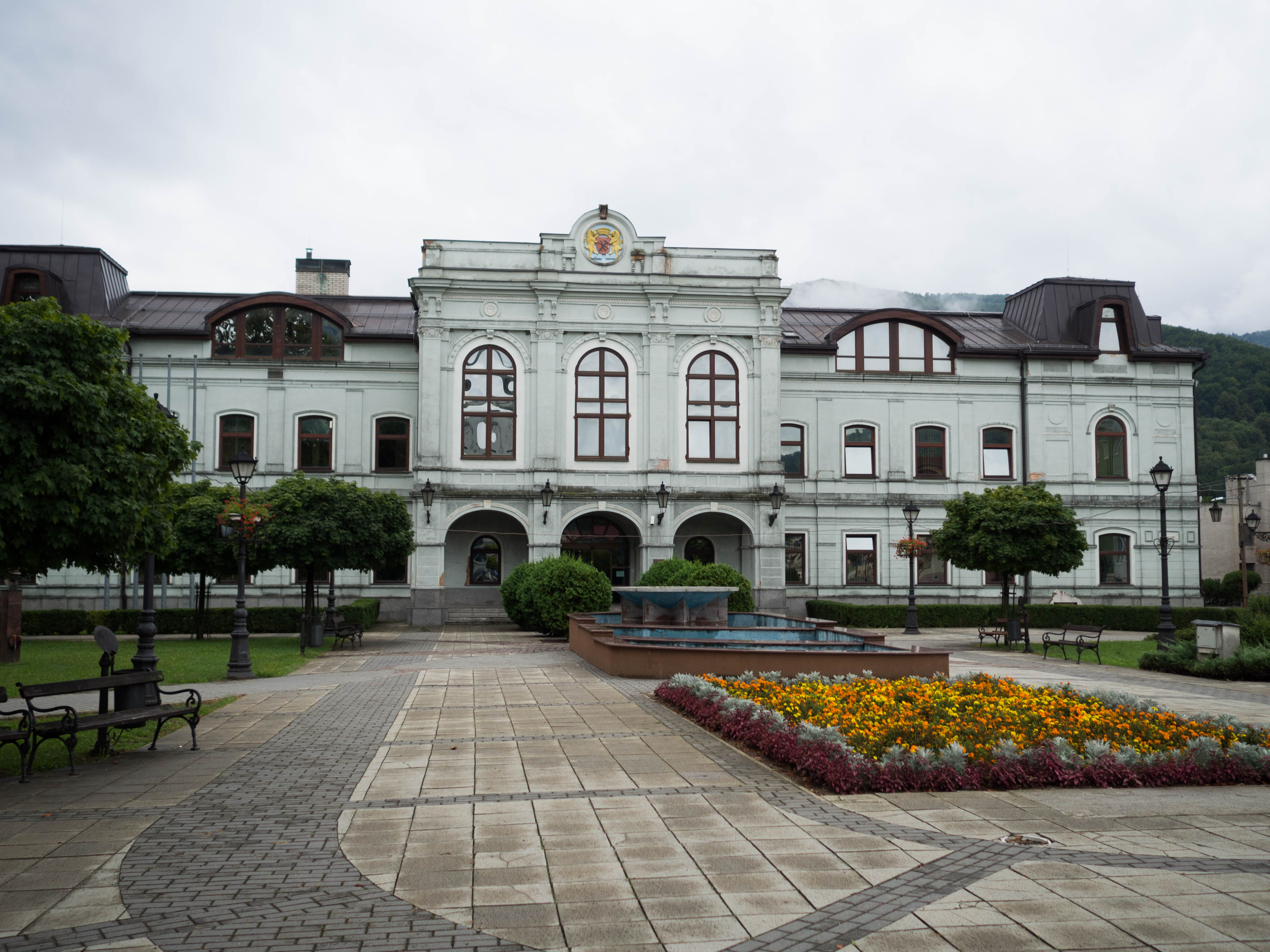
- Country: Slovakia
- Region (kraj): Banská Bystrica Region
- Seat: Revúca

Area
  - Total: 730.09 km^{2} (281.89 sq mi)

Population (2025)
  - Total: 37,528
- Time zone: UTC+1 (CET)
  - Summer (DST): UTC+2 (CEST)
- Telephone prefix: 058
- Vehicle registration plate (until 2022): RV
- Municipalities: 42

Revúca District (Slovak: okres Revúca, Hungarian: Nagyrőcei) is a district in the Banská Bystrica Region of central Slovakia. District had been established in 1996. Forests make 60% of the district area. Revúca District consist of 42 municipalities, from which three have a town status. In the district is 1 national park Muránska planina. The highest concentration of industry is in the zone Revúca-Lubeník-Jelšava, otherwise trade and agriculture dominates the district economy. The seat of the district is the town of Revúca. Overall, economy development of the district is under Slovakia's average.

== Population ==
Population statistic (10 years)
Year	1995	2005	2015	2025
Count	40,970	40,563	40,124	37,528
Difference		−0.99%	−1.08%	−6.46%

Population statistic
Year	2024	2025
Count	37,676	37,528
Difference		−0.39%

It has a population of 37,528 people (31 December 2025).

Historical population
Year	Pop.	±%
1970	37,261	—
1980	39,400	+5.7%
1991	40,143	+1.9%
2001	40,918	+1.9%
2011	40,400	−1.3%
2021	38,669	−4.3%
Source: Statistical Office of the Slovak Republic

=== Ethnicity ===
Census 2021 (1+ %)
Ethnicity	Number	Fraction
Slovak	27,918	65.85%
Hungarian	7952	18.75%
Not found out	3141	7.4%
Romani	2897	6.83%
Total	42,390	

In year 2021 was 42,390 people by ethnicity 27,918 as Slovak, 7952 as Hungarian, 3141 as Not found out, 2897 as Romani, 189 as Czech, 70 as Other, 55 as Ukrainian, 29 as Russian, 26 as Rusyn, 23 as German, 15 as Chinese, 14 as Polish, 10 as English, 7 as Italian, 7 as Bulgarian, 6 as French, 5 as Vietnamese, 4 as Jewish, 4 as Moravian, 3 as Turkish, 3 as Romanian, 3 as Canadian, 3 as Albanian, 2 as Irish, 2 as Austrian, 1 as Greek and 1 as Croatian.

Note on population: The difference values of population numbers in the table "Population statistic" and in the sections "Ethnicity" & "Religion" is caused by the use of various statistical methods.

=== Religion ===
Census 2021 (1+ %)
Religion	Number	Fraction
None	15,395	39.81%
Roman Catholic Church	12,324	31.87%
Evangelical Church	4736	12.25%
Not found out	2945	7.62%
Calvinist Church	1768	4.57%
Greek Catholic Church	452	1.17%
Jehovah's Witnesses	397	1.03%
Total	38,669	

In year 2021 was 38,669 people by religion 15,395 from None, 12,324 from Roman Catholic Church, 4736 from Evangelical Church, 2945 from Not found out, 1768 from Calvinist Church, 452 from Greek Catholic Church, 397 from Jehovah's Witnesses, 143 from Baptists Church, 77 from Eastern Orthodox Church, 76 from United Methodist Church, 59 from Other, 57 from Christian Congregations in Slovakia, 42 from Other and not ascertained christian church, 42 from Seventh-day Adventist Church, 42 from Ad hoc movements, 22 from Paganism and natural spirituality, 20 from Buddhism, 17 from Old Catholic Church, 14 from Islam, 11 from Jewish community, 8 from Apostolic Church, 7 from Hinduism, 7 from Church of the Brethren, 5 from Church of Jesus Christ of Latter-day Saints, 2 from Czechoslovak Hussite Church and 1 from Bahá'i Community.

== Municipalities ==
Municipality	Area [km^{2}]	Population
Držkovce	20.69	567
Gemerská Ves	17.70	985
Gemerské Teplice	12.71	359
Gemerský Sad	12.18	285
Gemer	17.97	877
Hrlica	5.49	54
Hucín	12.55	914
Chvalová	9.28	197
Chyžné	19.52	415
Jelšava	46.79	3,178
Kameňany	31.34	852
Leváre	7.45	76
Levkuška	3.63	254
Licince	18.27	806
Lubeník	5.81	1,251
Magnezitovce	15.19	432
Mokrá Lúka	15.20	544
Muráň	103.15	1,152
Muránska Dlhá Lúka	18.65	943
Muránska Huta	8.45	173
Muránska Lehota	7.89	203
Muránska Zdychava	28.58	211
Nandraž	10.60	253
Otročok	5.38	319
Ploské	7.25	74
Polina	9.09	107
Prihradzany	4.55	70
Rákoš	13.02	394
Rašice	9.11	111
Ratková	12.71	663
Ratkovské Bystré	27.40	293
Revúca	38.86	10,778
Revúcka Lehota	6.83	316
Rybník	16.95	150
Sása	4.60	232
Sirk	18.33	1,384
Skerešovo	12.90	215
Šivetice	8.26	346
Tornaľa	57.76	6,646
Turčok	14.78	278
Višňové	8.29	64
Žiar	4.99	107

Population and area values are current for year 2025.
