= Ploské, Revúca District =

Ploské Poloszkó
- Municipality
- Flag

- Location of Ploské in the Banská Bystrica Region Location of Ploské in Slovakia
- Coordinates: 48°36′14″N 20°05′11″E
- Country: Slovakia
- Region: Banská Bystrica Region
- District: Revúca District
- First mentioned: 1413

Area
  - Total: 7.25 km^{2} (2.80 sq mi)
- Elevation: 313 m (1,027 ft)

Population (2025)
  - Total: 74
- Time zone: UTC+1 (CET)
  - Summer (DST): UTC+2 (CEST)
- Postal code: 982 65
- Area code: +421 47
- Vehicle registration plate (until 2022): RA
- Website: ploske.eu

Ploské (Hungarian: Poloszkó) is a village and municipality in Revúca District in the Banská Bystrica Region of Slovakia.

== Population ==
Population statistic (10 years)
Year	1995	2005	2015	2025
Count	91	83	69	74
Difference		−8.79%	−16.86%	+7.24%

Population statistic
Year	2024	2025
Count	75	74
Difference		−1.33%

It has a population of 74 people (31 December 2025).

=== Ethnicity ===
Census 2021 (1+ %)
Ethnicity	Number	Fraction
Slovak	69	97.18%
Not found out	2	2.81%
Romani	1	1.4%
Total	71	

In year 2021 was 71 people by ethnicity 69 as Slovak, 2 as Not found out and 1 as Romani.

Note on population: The difference values of population numbers in the table "Population statistic" and in the sections "Ethnicity" & "Religion" is caused by the use of various statistical methods.

=== Religion ===
Census 2021 (1+ %)
Religion	Number	Fraction
Evangelical Church	27	38.03%
Roman Catholic Church	24	33.8%
None	18	25.35%
Not found out	2	2.82%
Total	71	

In year 2021 was 71 people by religion 27 from Evangelical Church, 24 from Roman Catholic Church, 18 from None and 2 from Not found out.
