= Hrkać =

Hrkać is a Slavic surname.

== List of people ==
Persons with the surname Hrkać include:

- Alexander Hrkać, president of KK Vrijednosnice Osijek
- Ante Hrkać (born 1992), Bosnian professional footballer
- Miljenko Hrkać (1947–1978), Croatian alleged terrorist
- Mirko Hrkać, futsal player in the Bosnia and Herzegovina national futsal team

== See also ==
- Hrkáč, former village that merged into Gemerská Ves
- Tony Hrkac, Canadian ice hockey player
- Hrkaći, a hamlet of Izbično
