= Gemerská Ves =

Village and municipality in Slovakia

Gemerská Ves Gömörfalva
- Municipality
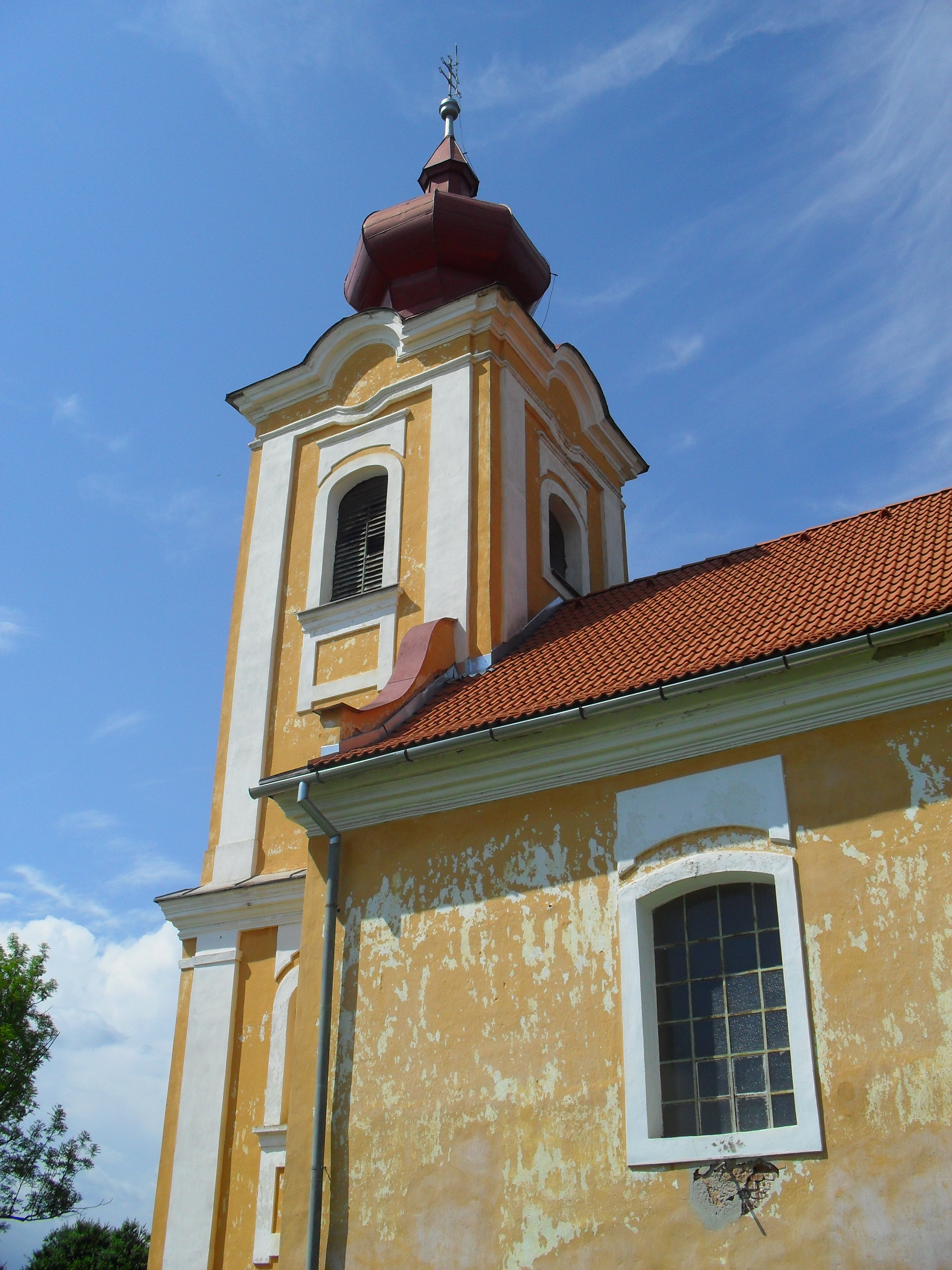

- Flag Coat of arms

- Location of Gemerská Ves in the Banská Bystrica Region Location of Gemerská Ves in Slovakia
- Coordinates: 48.48°N 20.27°E
- Country: Slovakia
- Region: Banská Bystrica Region
- District: Revúca District
- First mentioned: 1266

Area
  - Total: 17.70 km^{2} (6.83 sq mi)
- Elevation: 196 m (643 ft)

Population (2025)
  - Total: 985
- Time zone: UTC+1 (CET)
  - Summer (DST): UTC+2 (CEST)
- Postal code: 982 62
- Area code: +421 47
- Vehicle registration plate (until 2022): RA
- Website: www.gemerskaves.sk

Gemerská Ves (Hungarian: Gömörfalva) is a village and municipality in Revúca District in the Banská Bystrica Region of Slovakia.

== Geography ==
The municipality lies at an altitude of 196 metres (643 ft) and covers an area of 17.70 km^{2} (6.83 sq mi) (2025).

== History ==
It arose in 1964 for the union of the Hrkáč (Hungarian: Harkács) and Šankovice (Hungarian: Sánkfalva) in a unique municipality. Hrkáč was first mentioned, in the past, in 1274 (Harkach), when King Ladislav gave the village to Otročok. In the 16th century it suffered because of Turkish devastations. Šankovice, instead, was first mentioned in 1266 (1266 Raas, 1294 Sank, 1421 Sankfalua) and derives its name from the Slavic name Šank. It belonged to families Sánkfalvay, local feudatories, and Hösoy. It was destroyed by Turks in 1556. In the 18th century, it belonged to families Steinicher and local landowners Draskóczy. From 1938 to 1945 both the villages were annexed by Hungary.

== Genealogical resources ==
The records for genealogical research are available at the state archive "Statny Archiv in Banska Bystrica, Slovakia"

- Roman Catholic church records (births/marriages/deaths): 1733-1896 (parish B)
- Greek Catholic church records (births/marriages/deaths): 1817-1939 (parish B)
- Lutheran church records (births/marriages/deaths): 1730-1895 (parish B)

== Population ==
Population statistic (10 years)
Year	1995	2005	2015	2025
Count	880	961	965	985
Difference		+9.20%	+0.41%	+2.07%

Population statistic
Year	2024	2025
Count	992	985
Difference		−0.70%

It has a population of 985 people (31 December 2025).

=== Ethnicity ===
Census 2021 (1+%)
Ethnicity	Number	Fraction
Hungarian	616	61.53%
Slovak	391	39.06%
Romani	185	18.48%
Not found out	55	5.49%
Total	1001	

In year 2021 was 1001 people by ethnicity 616 as Hungarian, 391 as Slovak, 185 as Romani, 55 as Not found out, 3 as Czech and 1 as German.

Note on population: The difference values of population numbers in the table "Population statistic" and in the sections "Ethnicity" & "Religion" is caused by the use of various statistical methods.

=== Religion ===
Census 2021 (1+%)
Religion	Number	Fraction
Roman Catholic Church	643	64.24%
None	239	23.88%
Not found out	38	3.8%
Calvinist Church	20	2%
Greek Catholic Church	18	1.8%
Evangelical Church	16	1.6%
Jehovah's Witnesses	14	1.4%
Total	1001	

In year 2021 was 1001 people by religion 643 from Roman Catholic Church, 239 from None, 38 from Not found out, 20 from Calvinist Church, 18 from Greek Catholic Church, 16 from Evangelical Church, 14 from Jehovah's Witnesses, 6 from Christian Congregations in Slovakia, 2 from Other, 2 from United Methodist Church, 1 from Old Catholic Church, 1 from Eastern Orthodox Church and 1 from Buddhism.

== See also ==
- List of municipalities and towns in Slovakia
