= Church of Saint John the Baptist (Dvůr Králové nad Labem) =

Church in Hradec Králové, Czech Republic

Coordinates: 50°26′02″N 15°48′48″E

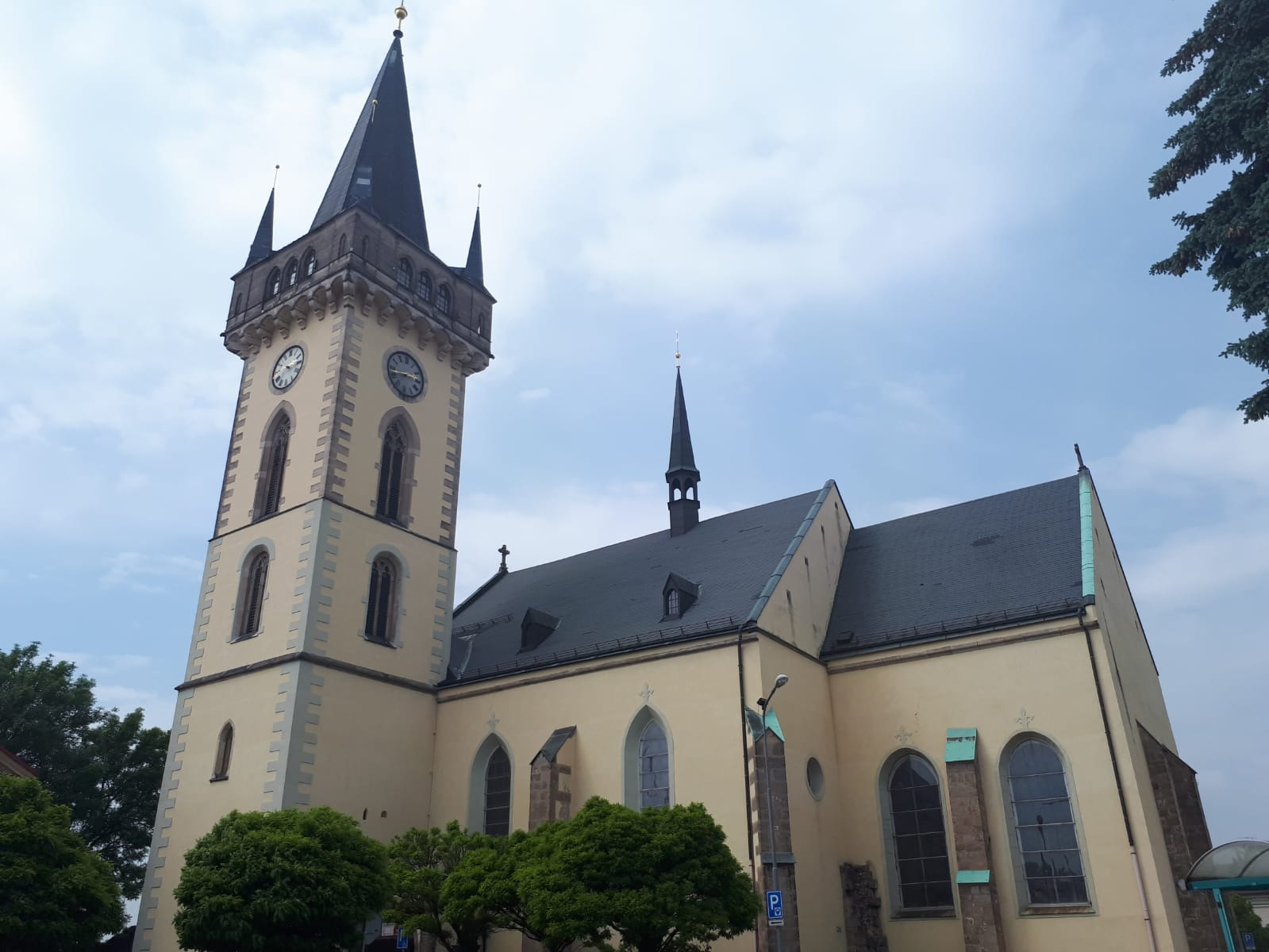
View from the south

The Church of Saint John the Baptist (Czech: Kostel svatého Jana Křtitele) is a Gothic church in Dvůr Králové nad Labem in the Hradec Králové Region of the Czech Republic It is protected as a cultural monument.

The first church on the site was a 13th century Romanesque single-nave basilica. A Gothic church from 1345 replaced it and a three-nave church was built between 1399–1400. In the 15th century, the church was destroyed by fire and rebuilt once more, with an added vestibule and church spire. Between 1893 and 1900 the church underwent significant reconstruction and expansion, including the elongation of the tower by 64 meters. The Gothic appearance of the church was regained according to a design by the architect F. Schmoraz. While the church was being repaired in 2007, some archaeological discoveries were made.

The church played an important role in the Czech National Revival. The Dvůr Králové manuscript, which together with the Zelená Hora manuscript were purported to be the earliest examples of written Czech texts (now both known to be fakes), was "found" there.

== Exterior ==
The church has an uneven ground plan, is oriented and has a supporting system. On the east side, there is a presbytery, a sacristy on its north side, and a vestibule and a tower on the south side.

The façade has no decoration other than stucco.

There are four entryways into the church, and one into the tower. An early Gothic ogive portal from the north, a door to sacristy from the east, and two Gothic ogive portals from the south. The church has a saddleback roof, the sacristy has an aisle roof. The altar is lit by the window on the east side of the presbytery. Another two windows in the presbytery portray God and The Baptism of Jesus. In the south east corner, there are fragments of the 13th-century apsis.

== Interior ==
The entry is from the south side through the wooden door from late 19th century. In the vestibule, there is a cross-shaped vault as well as in the church. The church is divided into three naves by two pairs of columns with polygonal pedestals. The sacristy has an annular vault. Above the entry to the sacristy, there are three paintings by Rudolf Adamek from 1933.

== Tower ==
The tower was built in 1431, but burned down in 1450. It was rebuilt in 1485. On the top of the tower, there was a flat, for a tower keeper. In 1894, it was raised to 64 metres. Under the flat there is a clock mechanism. In the tower there are three bells: Saint John, Passing bell and Meridian bell. Under the tower, there is a Virgin Mary chapel.

== Gallery ==
In the gallery, there is an organ from 1780. In 1776, the gallery was raised and an entryway to a tower dungeon is now under its floor. In the dungeon, there was a town vault. In 1817, Václav Hanka found a manuscript there that was supposedly the oldest written Czech text, with 14 songs from the 13th century. Although the manuscript was later proven a fake, it did have an influence on events during the Czech National Revival. It was later named the Manuscript of Dvur Kralove.

== Gallery ==
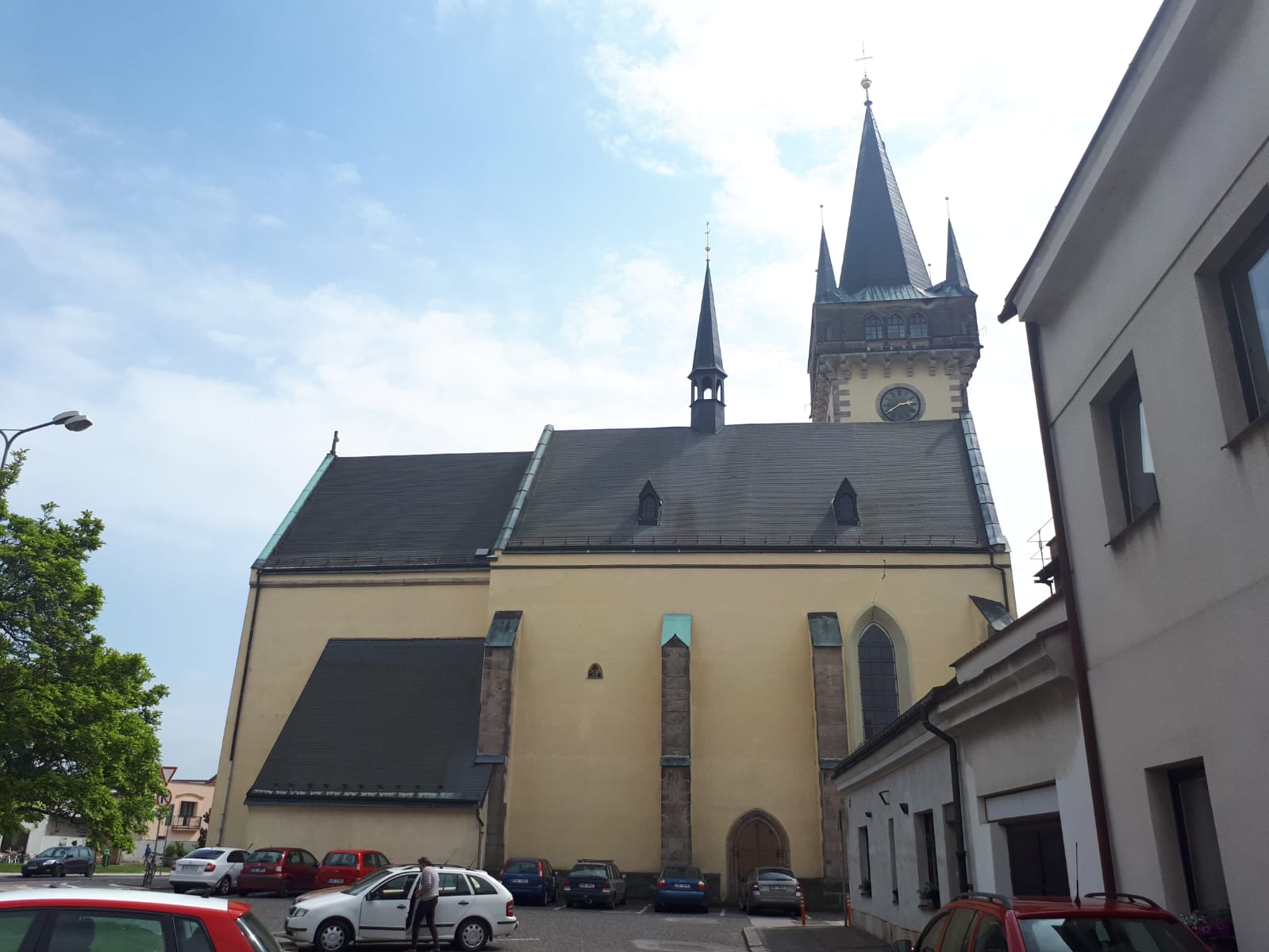
North wall

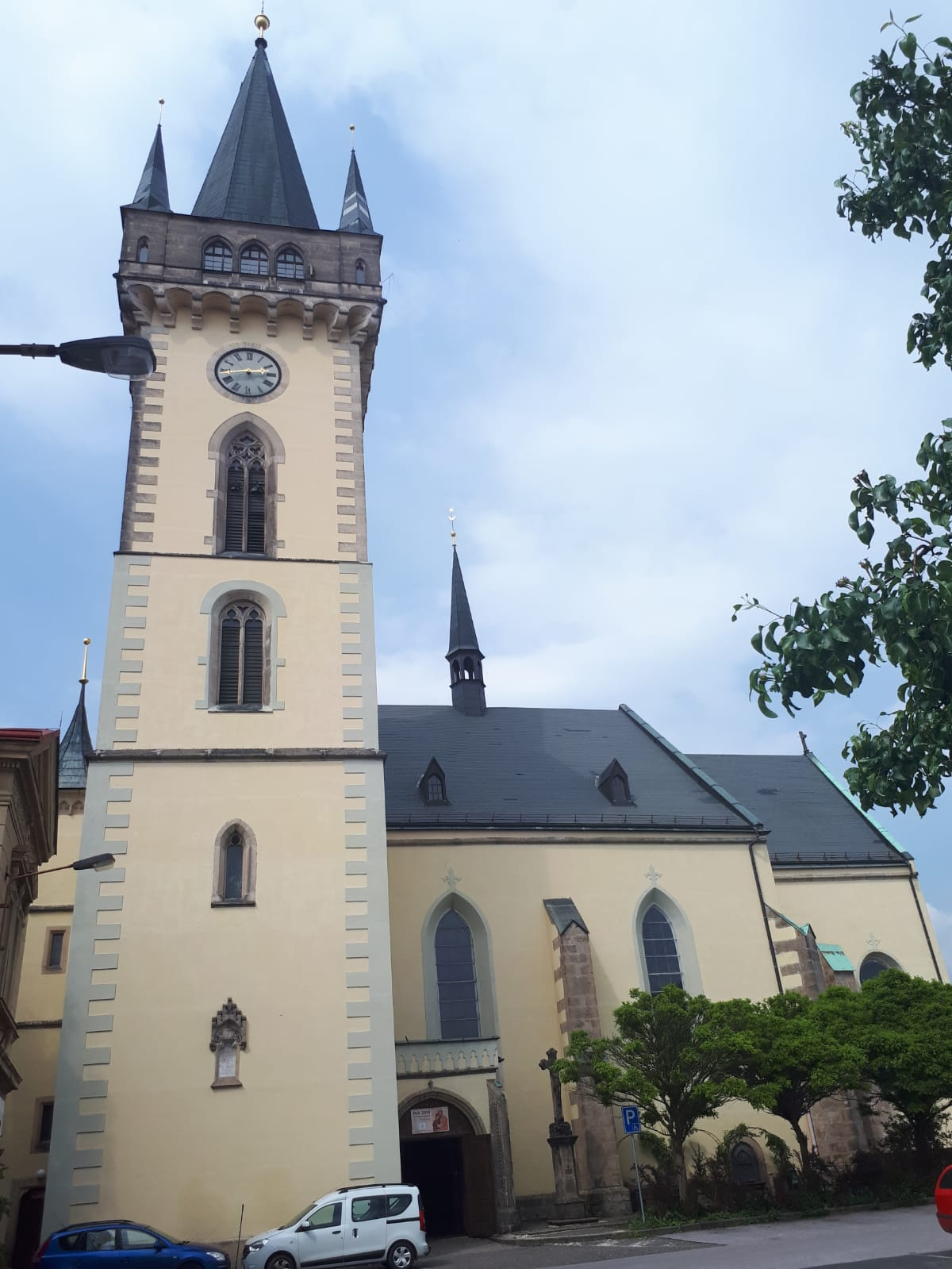
Tower

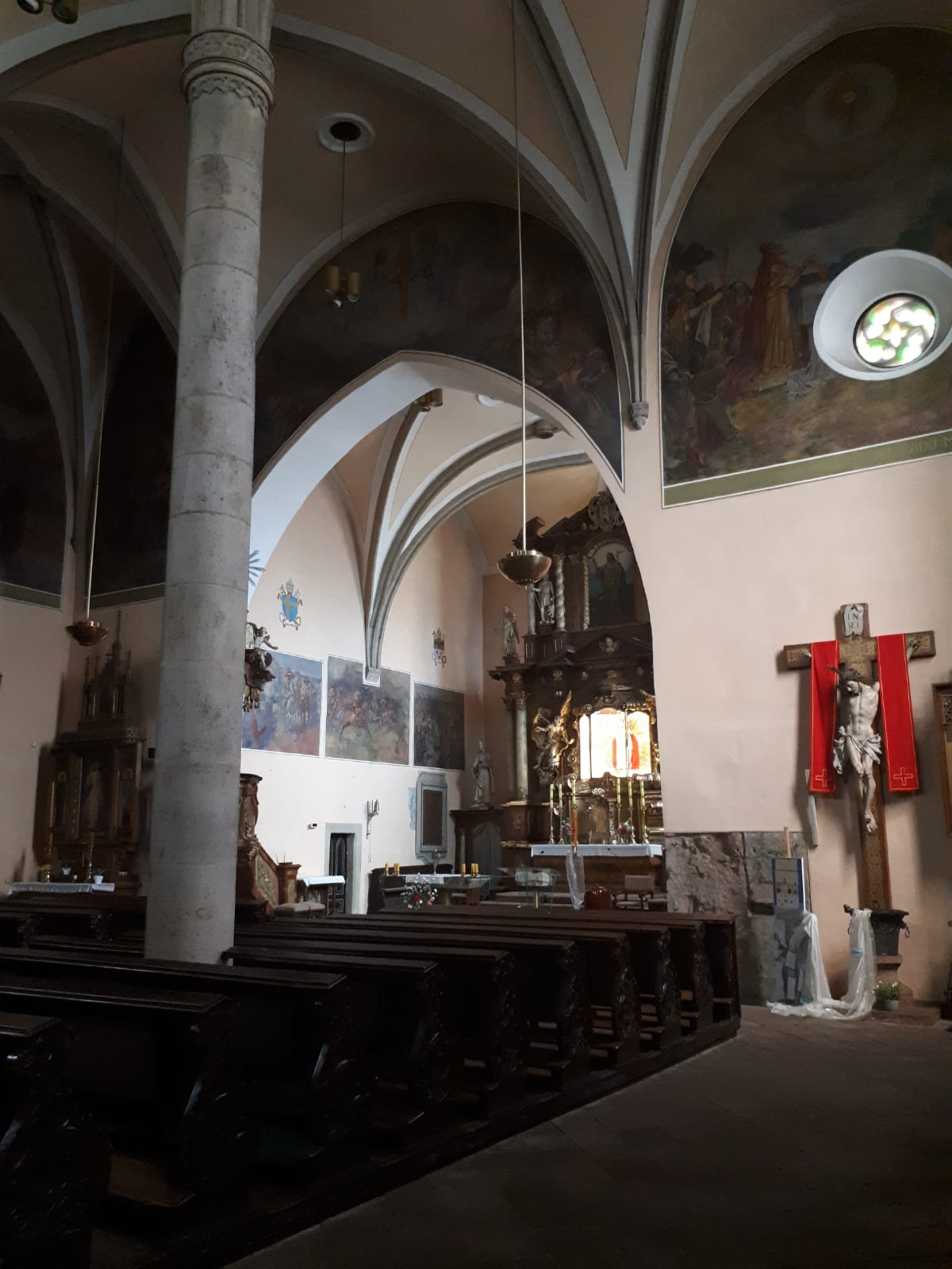
Interior

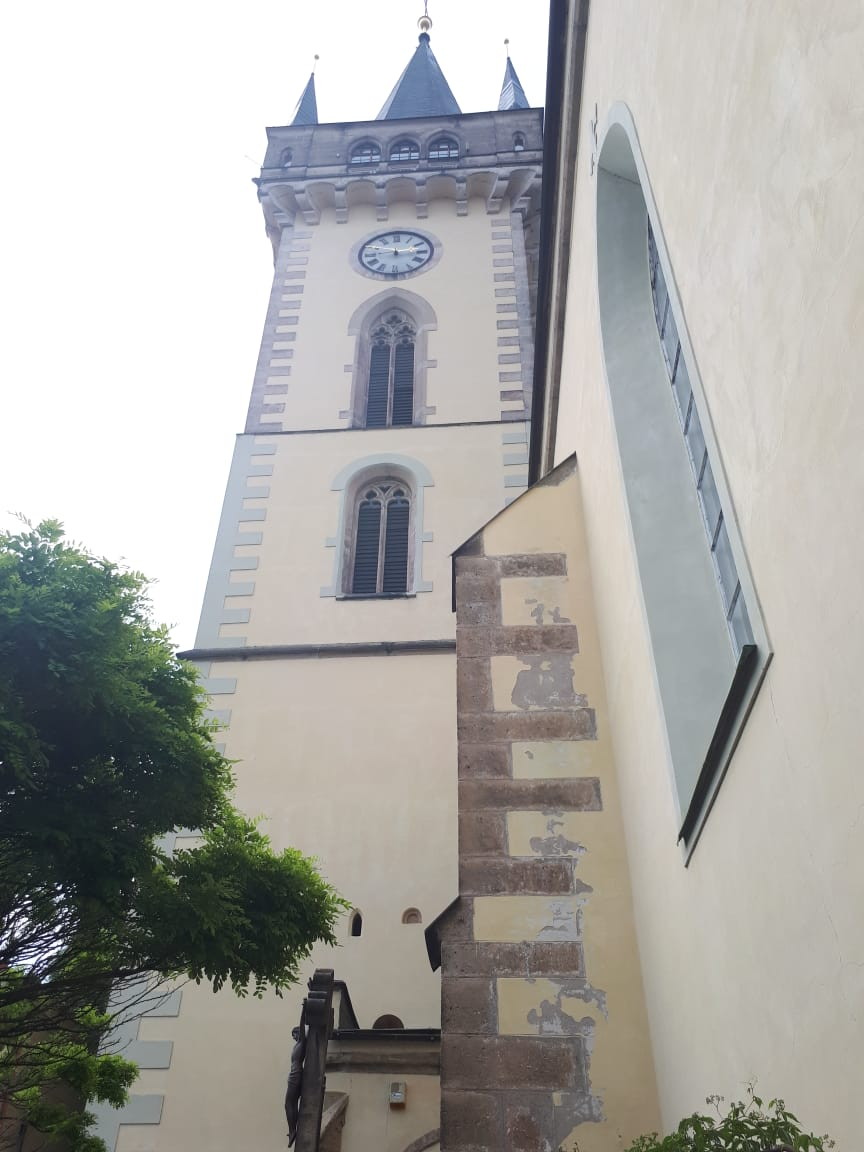
Tower

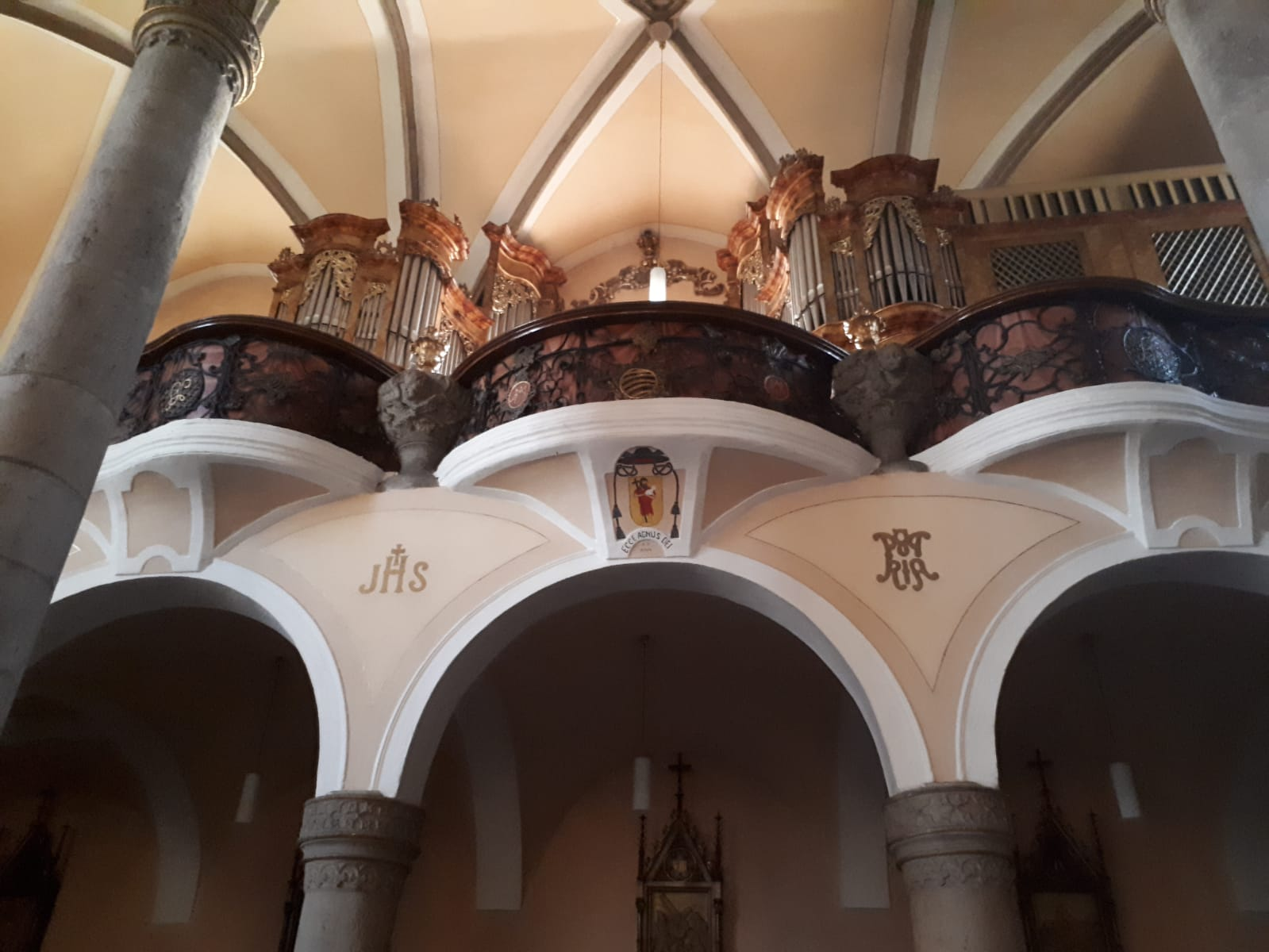
Interior

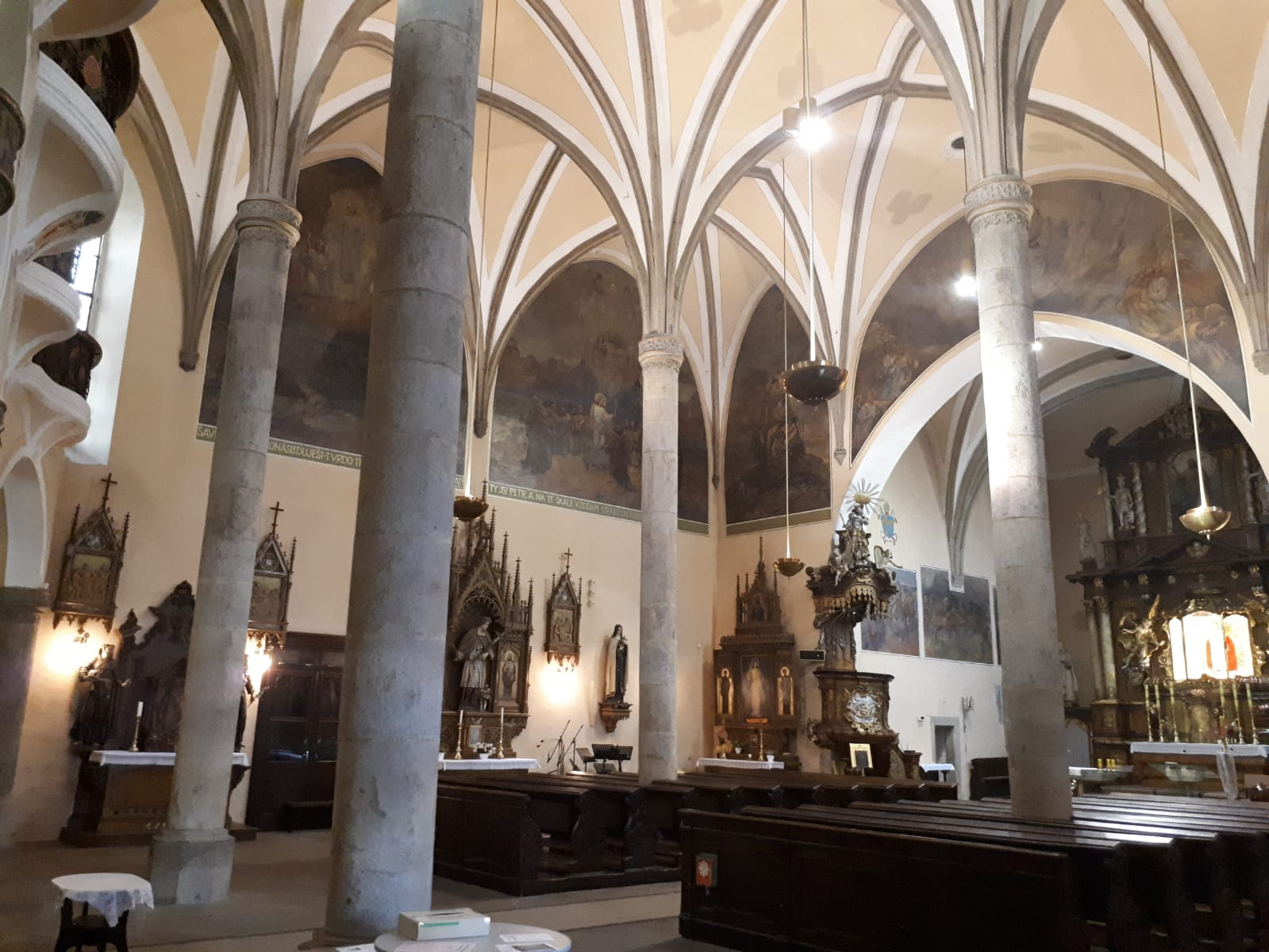
Interior

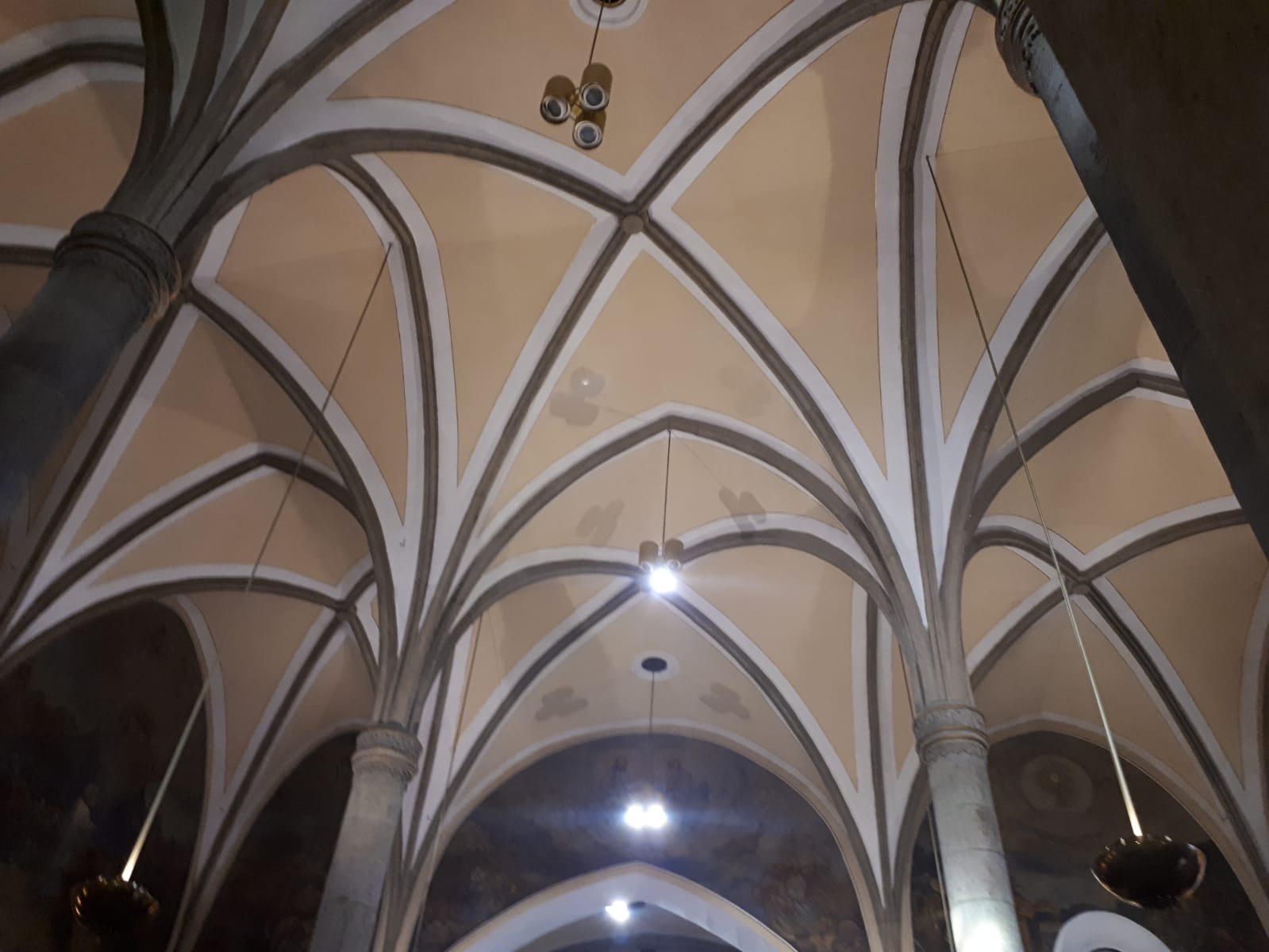
Interior

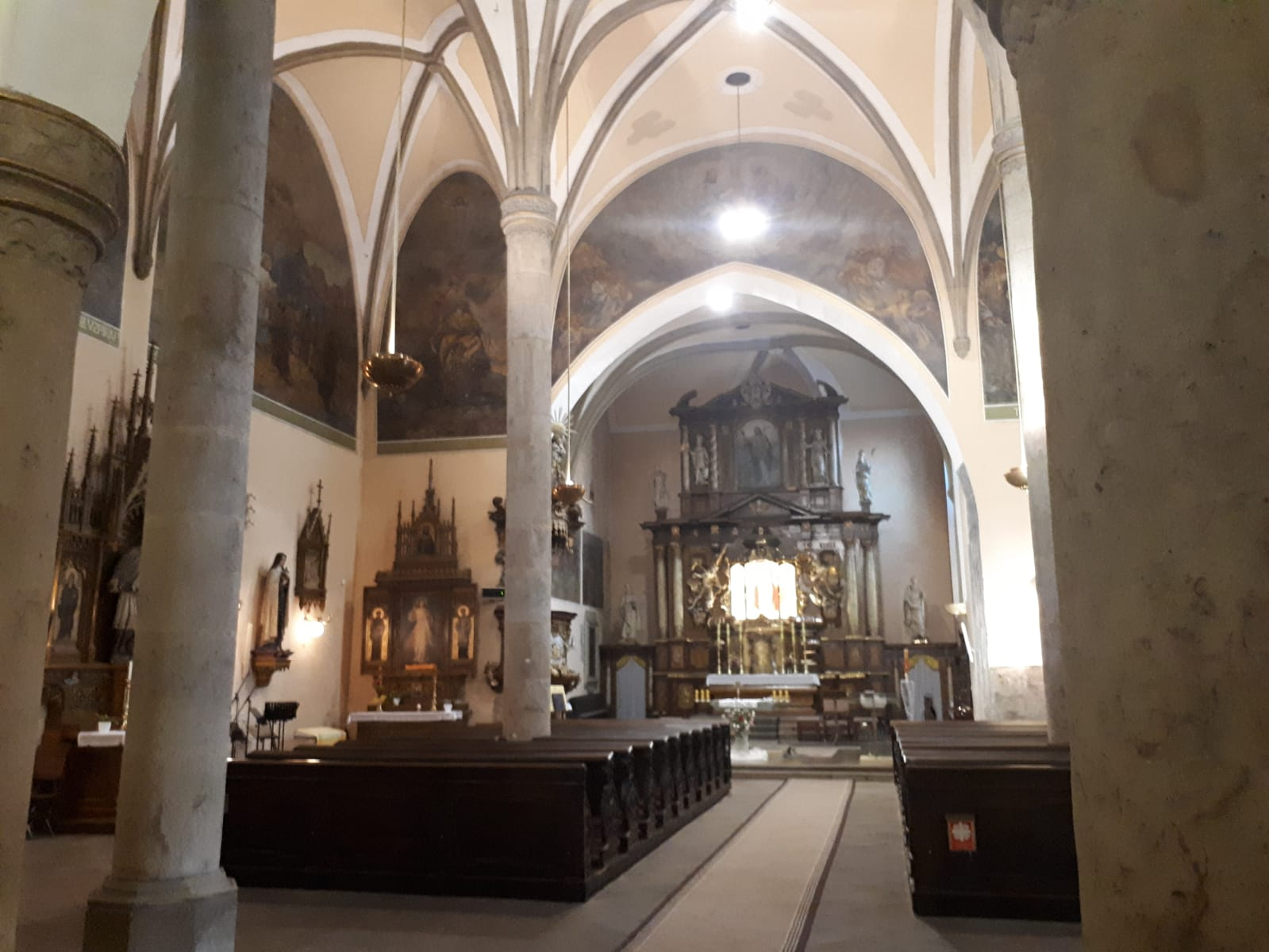
Interior

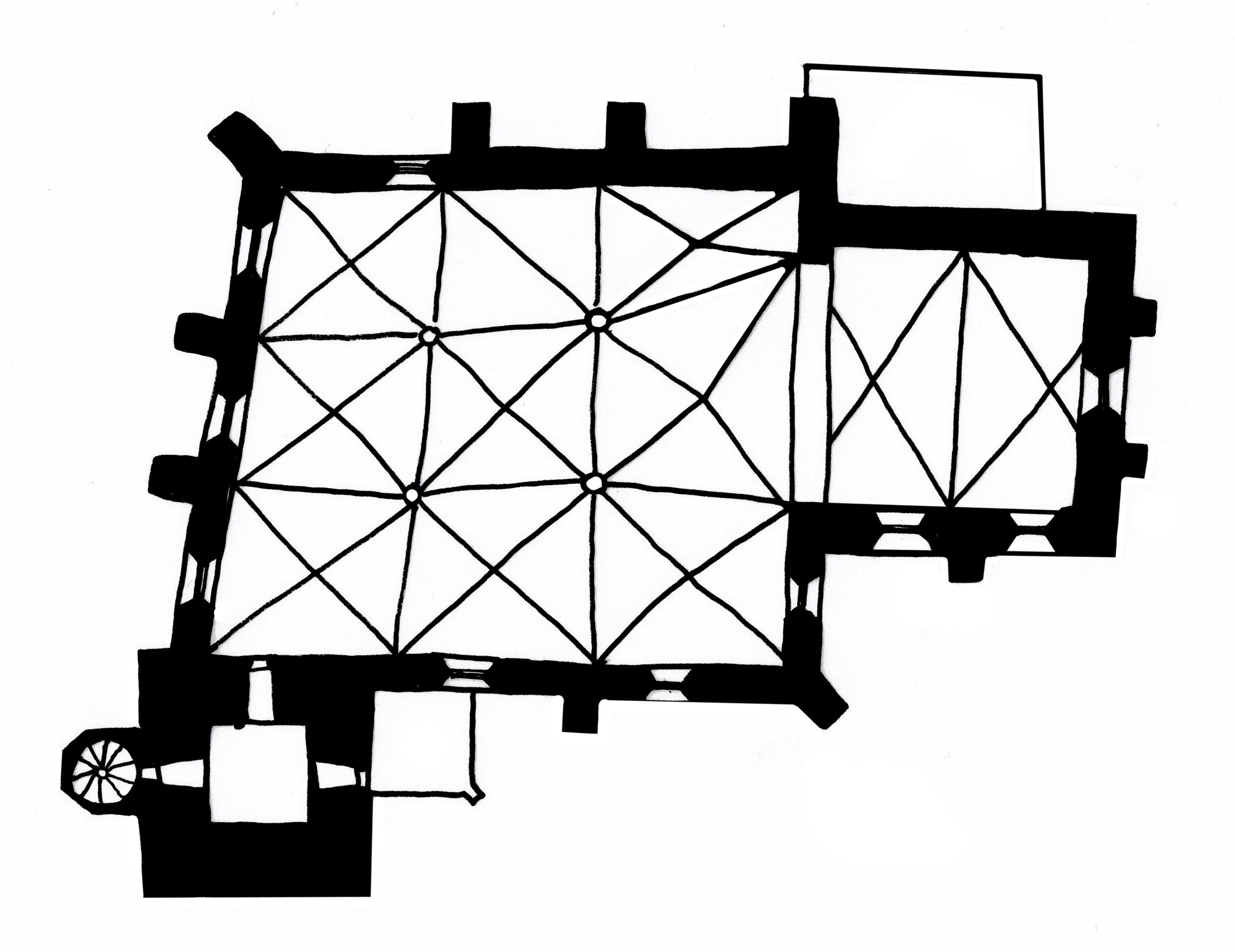
Groundplan

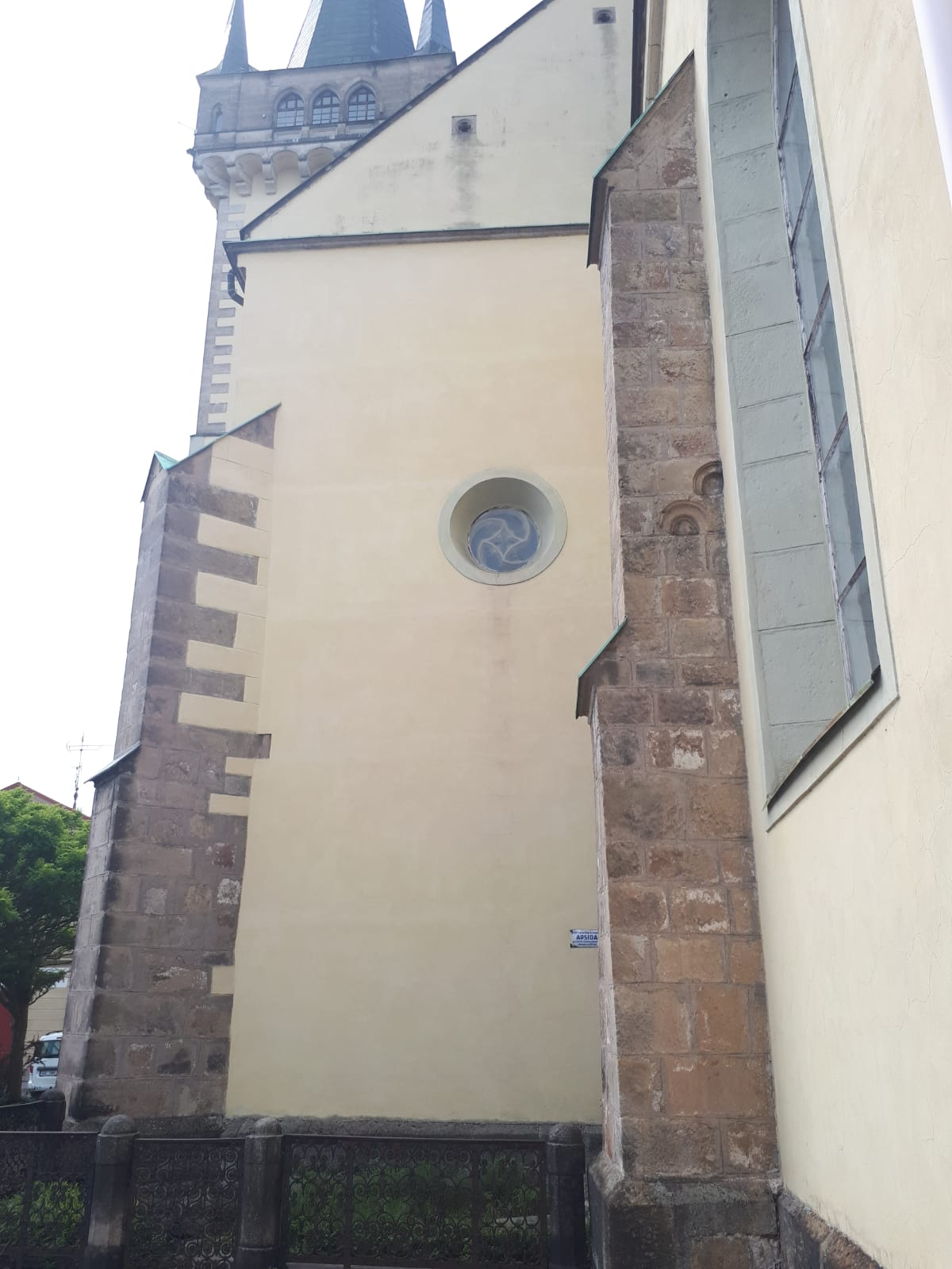
Detail

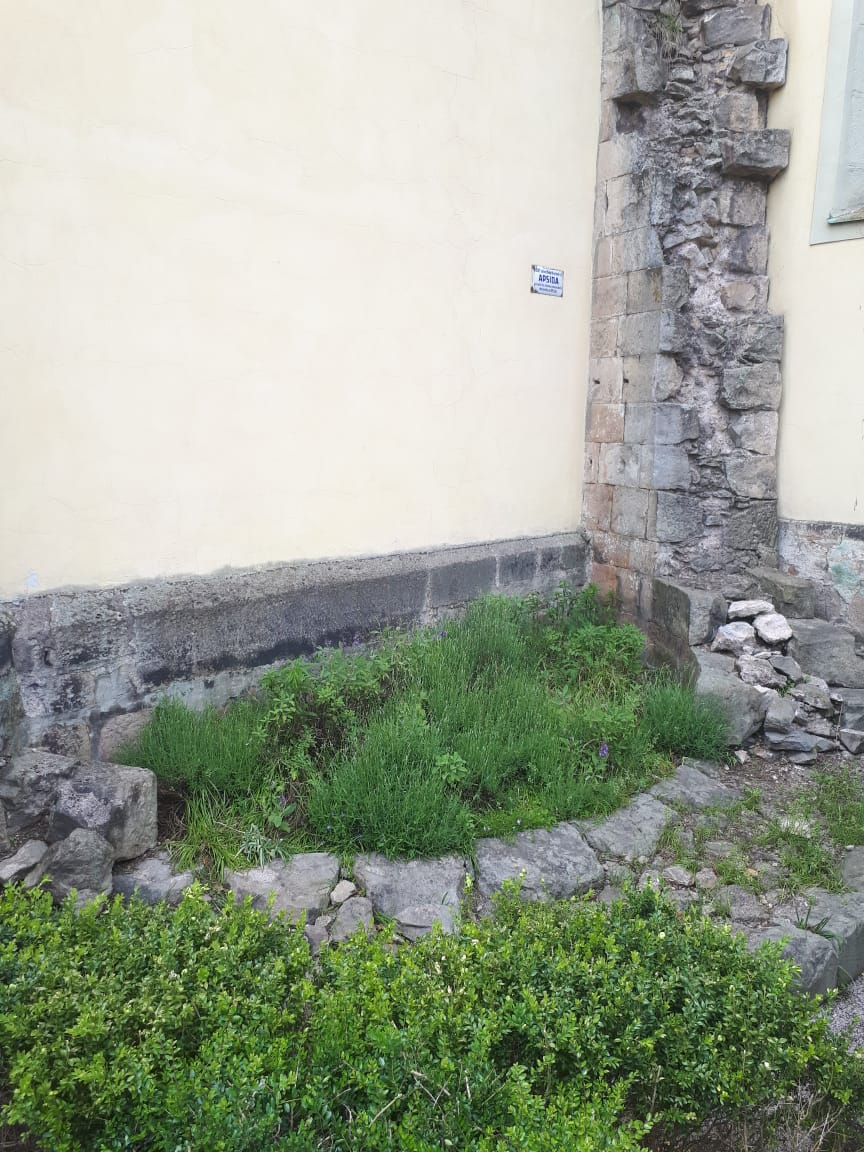
Apsis

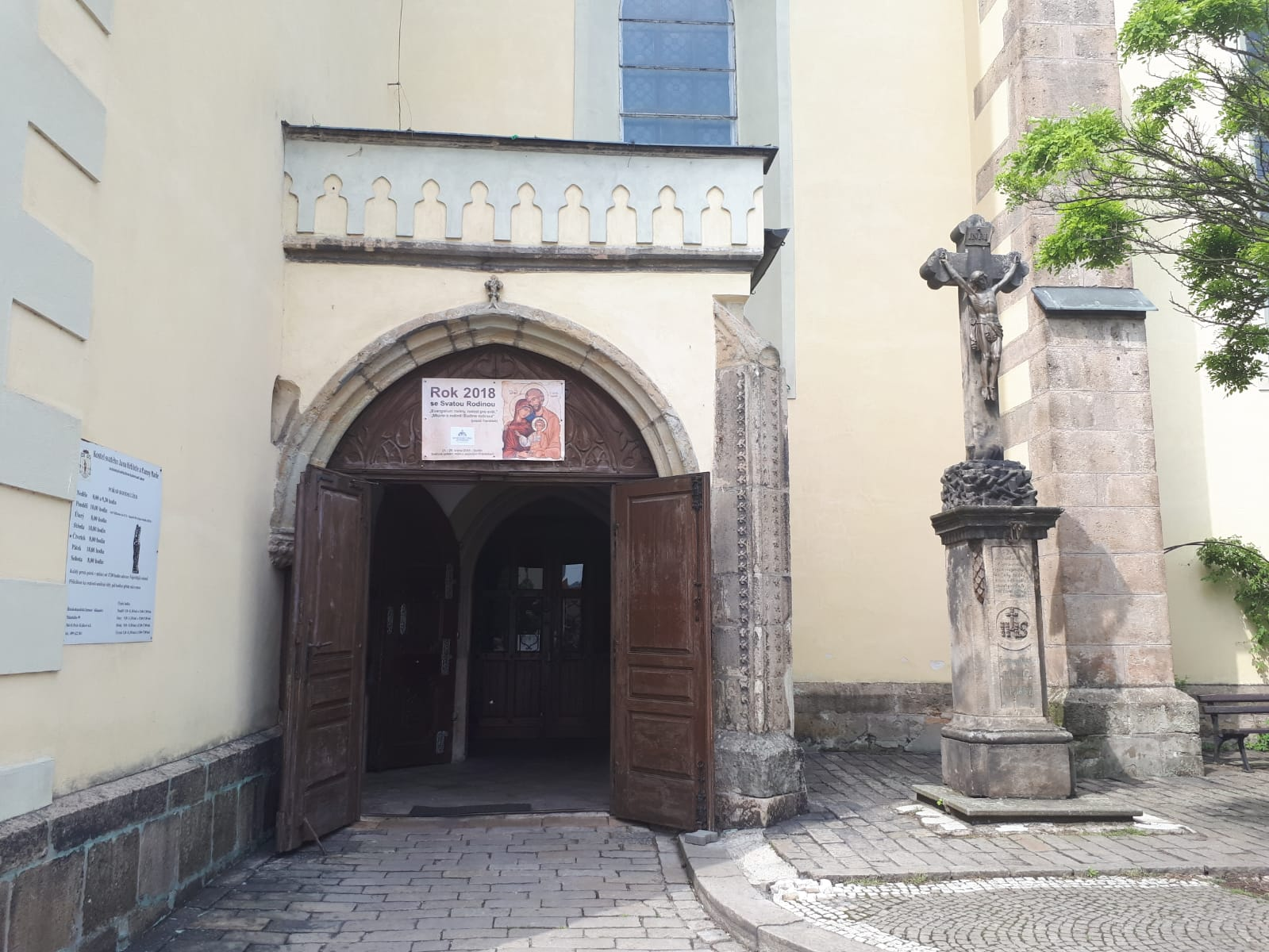
Entry
