= Vojtěch Šafařík =

Czech chemist

Portrait of Šafařík

Vojtěch Šafařík (26 October 1829 – 2 July 1902) was a Czech chemist, specialising in inorganic chemistry. He is the son of Pavel Jozef Šafárik.

== Life ==
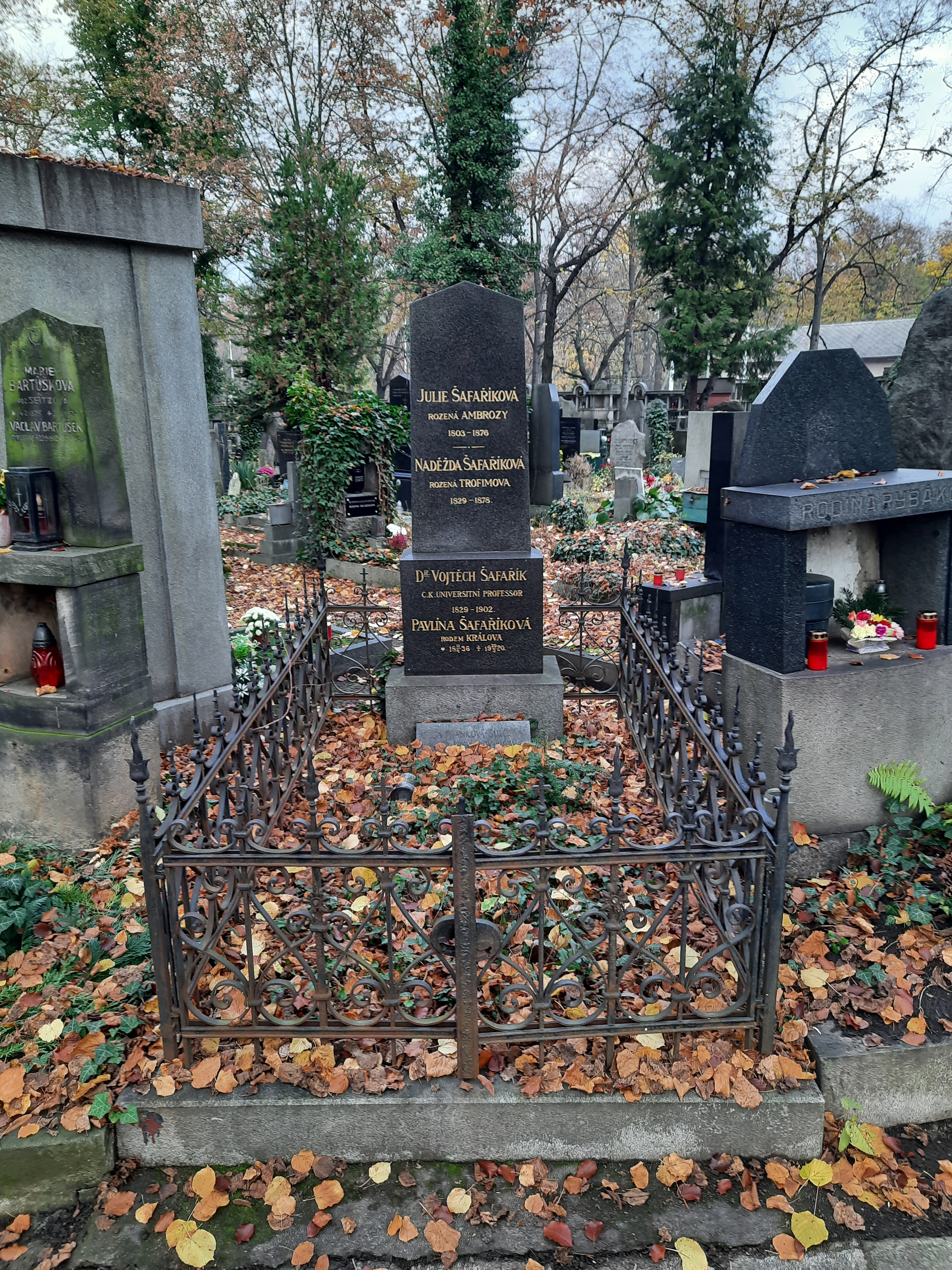
Grave of Šafařík at the Olšany Cemetery

Šafařík was born on 26 October 1829 in Újvidék, Vojvodina, Kingdom of Hungary (today Serbia). His father was Pavel Jozef Šafárik, Slovak philologist and historian. He died on 2 July 1902 in Prague, Bohemia.

== Work ==
In Göttingen, he was involved in the investigation of the reaction of metals with alkyl iodides and produced diethylmagnesium. He also worked on the chemical composition of platinum and vanadium catalysts, and on organometallic compounds (Grignard compounds). At the Vienna Academy he published a work on physical chemistry. He also studied mineralogy.

In 1859, together with fellow chemist Antonín Bělohoubek, he participated in a detailed chemical and microscopic analysis of the authenticity of the notorious manuscripts of Dvůr Králové and of Zelená Hora. Finding Prussian blue (unknown until the 18th century) in the initialling of the manuscripts, which were purported to date from the 1200s, they came to the conclusion that the manuscripts were forgeries and literary hoaxes.

In 1860, Šafařík published the first introductory university textbook of chemistry in Czech (Základové chemie čili lučby). He worked to improve Czech chemical terminology, building on and improving over the nomenclature of Czech chemist Jan Svatopluk Presl and the linguist Josef Jungmann. In 1882 he was appointed as the first professor of chemistry at Charles-Ferdinand University in Prague.

In later life, he wrote many popular textbooks as well as making over 20,000 observations of variable stars. His wife and co-worker Paulína Šafaříková was interested in the history and popularisation of astronomy.

== Honours ==
The crater Šafařík on the Moon is named after him, and so is the minor planet 8336 Šafařík (in conjunction with his wife).

== Name confusion ==
Vojtěch Šafařík's name has often been incorrectly recorded as Adalbert Šafařík. It is thought that the confusion arose because of misguided translation attempts. Saint Adalbert of Prague is known in Czech by his birth name of Vojtěch; however, that Vojtěch took the name Adalbert for his Confirmation, in honour of his tutor Adalbert of Magdeburg. Thus, the two names (Vojtěch and Adalbert) have no linguistic relationship with each other.

Šafařík himself contributed to the confusion. His written astronomical works are signed either "A. Šafařík" or "Adalbert Vojtěch Šafařík" as can be seen from the Astrophysics Data System listing all his papers.

== See also ==
- Czech chemical nomenclature
