= Czech chemical nomenclature =

Foundations of the Czech chemical nomenclature (Czech: české chemické názvosloví) and terminology were laid during the 1820s and 1830s. These early naming conventions fit the Czech language and, being mostly the work of a single person, Jan Svatopluk Presl, provided a consistent way to name chemical compounds. Over time, the nomenclature expanded considerably, following the recommendations by the International Union of Pure and Applied Chemistry (IUPAC) in the recent era.

Unlike the nomenclature that is used in biology or medicine, the chemical nomenclature stays closer to the Czech language and uses Czech pronunciation and inflection rules, but developed its own, very complex, system of morphemes (taken from Greek and Latin), grammar, syntax, punctuation and use of brackets and numerals. Certain terms (such as etanol 'ethanol') use the phonetic transcription, but the rules for spelling are inconsistent.

== History ==
Medieval alchemists in the Czech lands used obscure and inconsistent terminology to describe their experiments. Edward Kelley, an alchemist at the court of Rudolf II, even invented his own secret language. Growth of the industry in the region during the 19th century, and the nationalistic fervour of the Czech National Revival, led to the development of Czech terminologies for natural and applied sciences.

Jan Svatopluk Presl (1791–1849), an all-round natural scientist, proposed a new Czech nomenclature and terminology in the books Lučba čili chemie zkusná (1828–1835) and Nerostopis (1837). Presl had invented Czech neologisms for most of the then known chemical elements; ten of these, including vodík 'hydrogen', kyslík 'oxygen', uhlík 'carbon', dusík 'nitrogen' and křemík 'silicon', have entered the language. Presl also created naming conventions for oxides, in which the electronegative component of the compound became the noun and the electropositive component became an adjective. The adjectives were associated with a suffix, according to the valence number of the component they represented. Originally there were five suffixes: -ný, -natý, -itý, -ový, and -elý. These were later expanded to eight by Vojtěch Šafařík: -ný, -natý, -itý, -ičitý, -ičný and -ečný, -ový, -istý, and -ičelý, representing oxidation numbers from 1 to 8. For example, železnatý corresponds to 'ferrous' and železitý to 'ferric'.

Salts were identified by the suffix -an added to the noun. Many of the terms created by Presl derive from Latin, German or Russian; only some were retained in use.

A similar attempt published in Orbis pictus (1852) by Karel Slavoj Amerling (1807–1884) to create Czech names for the chemical elements (and to order the elements into a structure, similar to the work of Russian chemist Nikolay Beketov) was not successful.

Later work on the nomenclature was performed by Vojtěch Šafařík (1829–1902). In 1876 Šafařík started to publish the journal Listy chemické, the first chemistry journal in Austria-Hungary (today issued under the name Chemické Listy), and this journal has played an important role in the codification of the nomenclature and terminology. During a congress of Czech chemists in 1914, the nomenclature was reworked, and the new system became normative in 1918. Alexandr Sommer-Batěk (1874–1944) and Emil Votoček (1872–1950) were the major proponents of this change. Presl's original conventions remained in use, but formed only a small part of the naming system.

Several changes were applied to the basic terminology during the second half of the 20th century, usually moving closer to the international nomenclature. For example, the former term kysličník 'oxide' was officially replaced by oxid, uhlovodan 'carbohydrate' by sacharid and later even karbohydrát. The spelling of some chemical elements also changed: berylium 'beryllium' should now be written beryllium. Adoption of these changes by the Czech public has been quite slow, and the older terms are still used decades later.

The Czechoslovak Academy of Sciences, founded in 1953, took over responsibility for maintenance of the nomenclature and proper implementation of the IUPAC recommendations. Since the Velvet Revolution (1989) this activity has slowed down considerably.

== Oxidation state suffixes ==
Oxidation state	Suffix	Oxide example	Halide example
I	-ný	Li_{2}O oxid lithný	KCl chlorid draselný
II	-natý	MgO oxid hořečnatý	CaF_{2} fluorid vápenatý
III	-itý	B_{2}O_{3} oxid boritý	AlBr_{3} bromid hlinitý
IV	-ičitý	SiO_{2} oxid kremičitý	CCl_{4} chlorid uhličitý
V	-ičný, -ečný	As_{2}O_{5} oxid arseničný, P_{2}O_{5} oxid fosforečný	SbCl_{5} chlorid antimoničný, PI_{5} jodid fosforečný
VI	-ový	MoO_{3} oxid molybdenový	WCl_{6} chlorid wolframový
VII	-istý	Mn_{2}O_{7} oxid manganistý	ReF_{7} fluorid rhenistý
VIII	-ičelý	XeO_{4} oxid xenoničelý	XeF_{8} fluorid xenoničelý
IX	-utý		
