= Alois Vojtěch Šembera =

Czech linguist, literary historian and writer

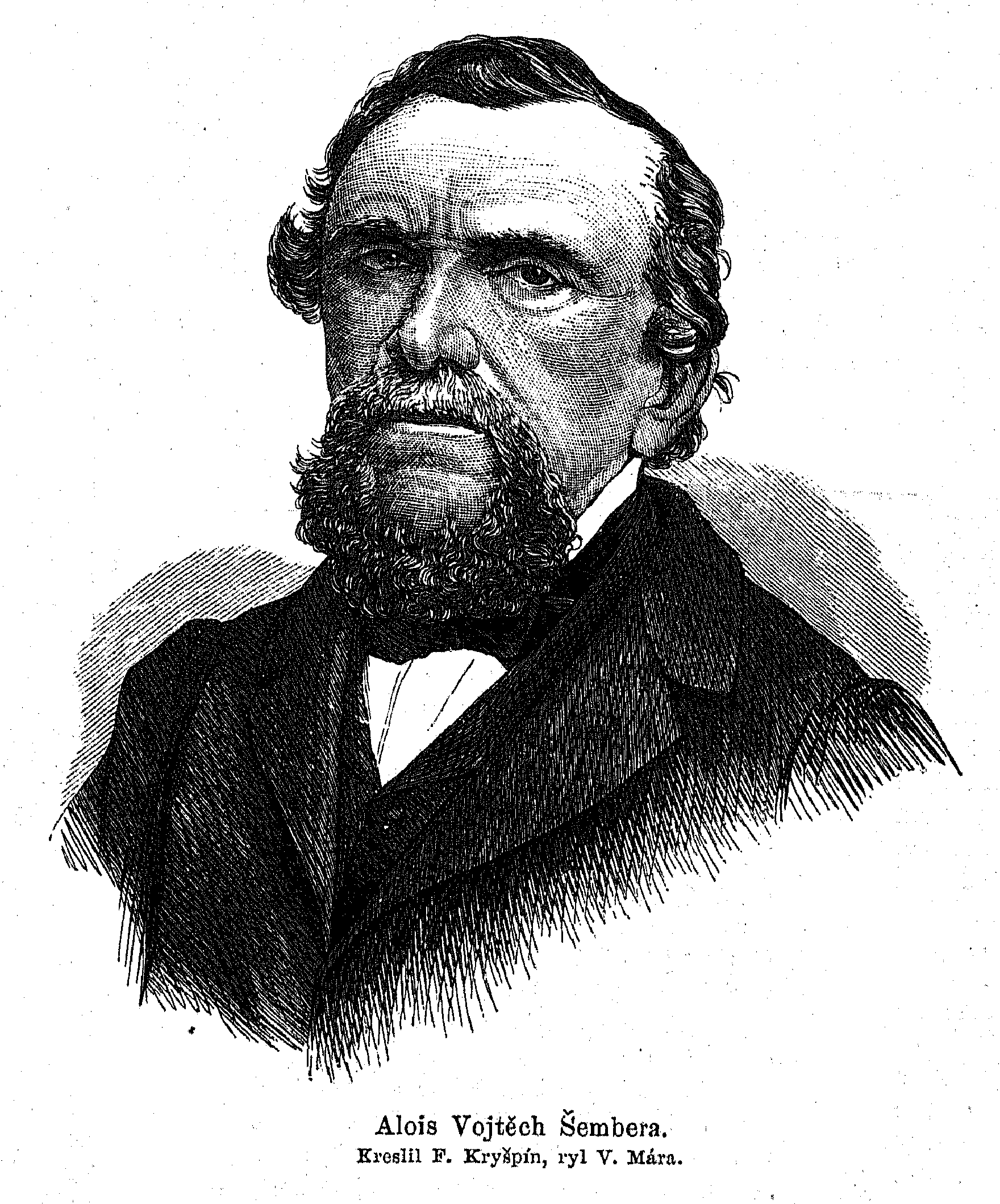
Alois Vojtěch Šembera (1867)

Alois Vojtěch Šembera (also Alois Adalbert Sembera/Schembera; 21 March 1807 – 23 March 1882) was a Czech linguist, literary historian, writer, journalist and patriot.

== Life and work ==
Šembera was born on 21 March 1807 in Vysoké Mýto in Bohemia, Austrian Empire. In 1819–1826, he studied at the gymnasium in Litomyšl. He studied philology at the Charles University in Prague in 1826–1827 and then law at the same university in 1827–1830.

Between 1830 and 1839, he worked as municipal lawyer in Brno (Moravia) and gave there private lessons to the children of local nobility. During 1839–1847, he taught Czech language and literature at the University of Olomouc. Between 1847 and 1849, Šembera supervised the Moravian provincial archive. During years of 1848–49 he was an editor of Moravské noviny (lit. 'Moravian newspaper'). In 1849 he was named professor of Czech language and literature at a University of Vienna.

Šembera was an active participant of the Czech National Revival. In 1839 he asserted to use Czech names for the streets in Brno, later in Olomouc, encouraged use of the Czech language and preservation of historical landmarks in the country. He initially believed in authenticity of manuscripts of Dvůr Králové and of Zelená Hora but later turned against them being rewarded by enmity of Czech nationalists.

Šembera died in Vienna, in Austria-Hungary on 23 March 1882.

== Works ==
- Historie pánů z Boskovic ("History of the Lords of Boskovice"), 1836.
- Vpád Mongolů do Moravy ("Incursion of Mongols into Moravia"), 1842.
- Über die Gleichstellung der beiden Landessprachen in Mähren ("About equality of both languages of Moravia"), 1848, written in German.
- Dějiny řeči a literatury českoslovanské. Věk starší. Od r. 58 př. Kr. do r. 1409 po Kr. ("History of Bohemian-Slavonic language and literature until 1409"), 1858.
- Paměti a znamenitosti města Olomouc ("History and landmarks of Olomouc"), 1861.
- Dějiny řeči a literatury českoslovanské. Věk novější. Od r. 1409 až do r. 1868 ("History of Bohemian-Slavonic language and literature since 1409 to 1868"), 1868.
- Obyvatelstvo české a německé na Moravě ("Czech and German inhabitants of Moravia"), 1873.
- Kdo sepsal Královédvorský rukopis roku 1817? ("Who wrote the Manuscript of Dvůr Králové in 1817?"), Vienna, 1880.
