= Hořiněves =

- Municipality
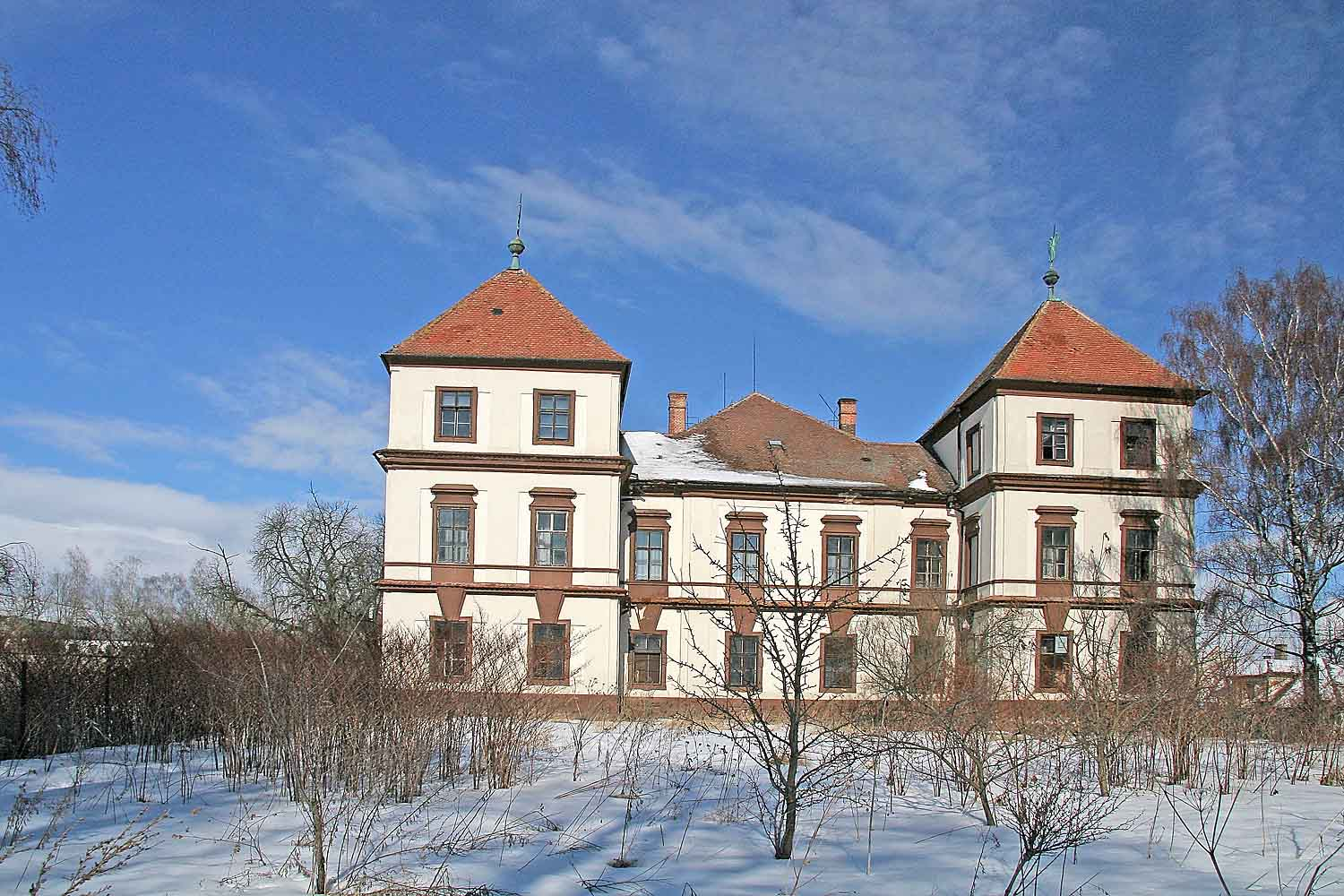
- Hořiněves Castle

- Flag Coat of arms

- Location in the Czech Republic
- Coordinates: 50°18′35″N 15°46′3″E
- Country: Czech Republic
- Region: Hradec Králové
- District: Hradec Králové
- First mentioned: 1238

Area
  - Total: 12.68 km^{2} (4.90 sq mi)
- Elevation: 267 m (876 ft)

Population (2026-01-01)
  - Total: 715
  - Density: 56.4/km^{2} (146/sq mi)
- Time zone: UTC+1 (CET)
  - Summer (DST): UTC+2 (CEST)
- Postal codes: 503 03, 503 06
- Website: www.horineves.cz

Hořiněves is a municipality and village in Hradec Králové District in the Hradec Králové Region of the Czech Republic. It has about 700 inhabitants.

== Administrative division ==
Hořiněves consists of four municipal parts (in brackets population according to the 2021 census):

- Hořiněves (489)
- Jeřičky (21)
- Želkovice (59)
- Žíželeves (116)

== Etymology ==
The name was derived from Hořina ves, meaning "Hora's village".

== Geography ==
Hořiněves is located about 11 kilometres (7 mi) north of Hradec Králové. It lies in an agricultural landscape in the East Elbe Table. The highest point is the flat hill Hořiněveské lípy at 320 m (1,050 ft) above sea level.

== History ==
The first written mention of Hořiněves is from 1238.

== Demographics ==
Historical population

Year	Pop.	±%
1869	1,464	—
1880	1,635	+11.7%
1890	1,672	+2.3%
1900	1,404	−16.0%
1910	1,367	−2.6%

Year	Pop.	±%
1921	1,252	−8.4%
1930	1,132	−9.6%
1950	824	−27.2%
1961	803	−2.5%
1970	786	−2.1%

Year	Pop.	±%
1980	785	−0.1%
1991	732	−6.8%
2001	686	−6.3%
2011	662	−3.5%
2021	685	+3.5%

Source: Censuses

== Transport ==
There are no major roads passing through the municipality. The railway that runs through Hořiněves is unused.

== Sights ==
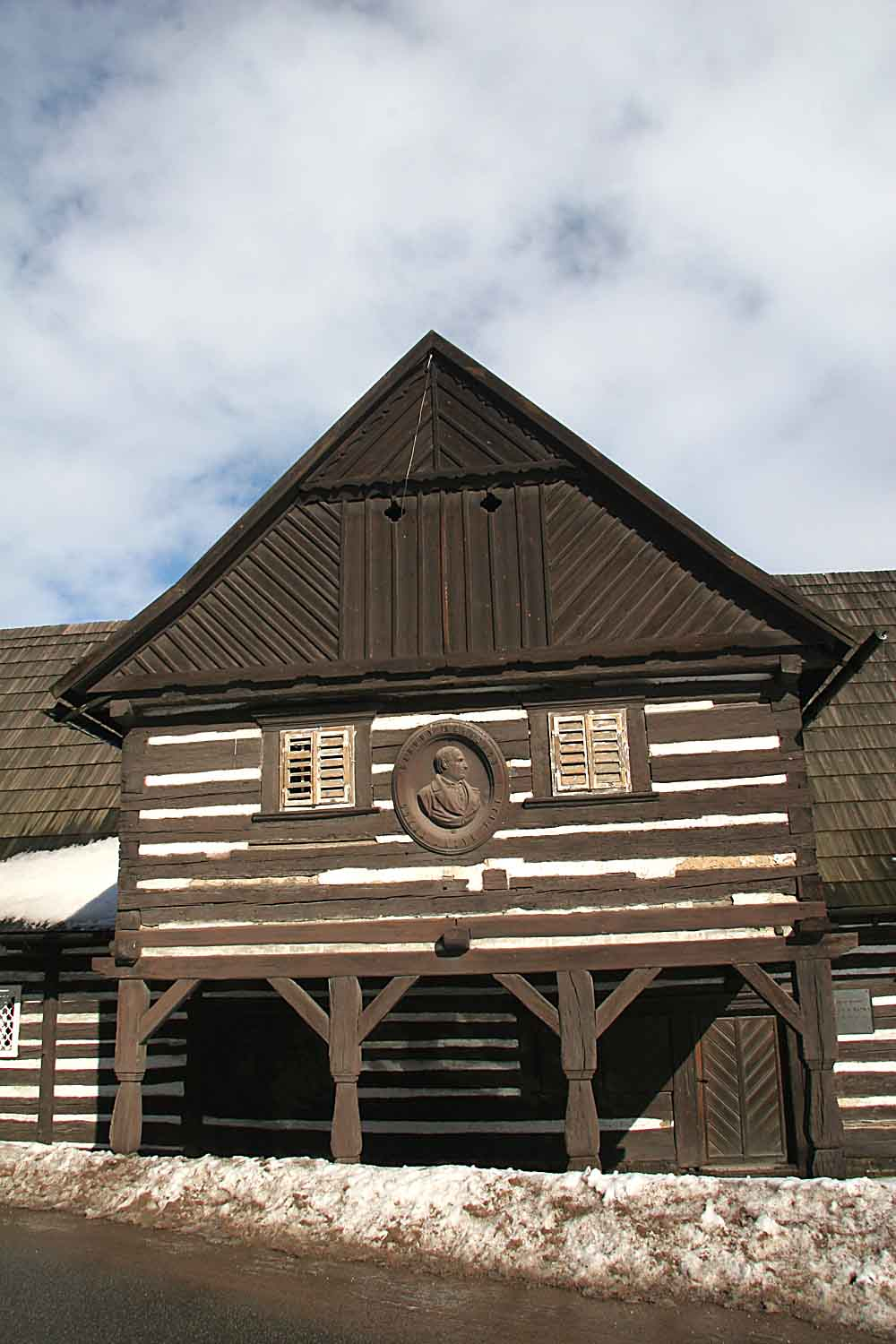
Birthplace of Václav Hanka

The main sight of Hořiněves is the Hořiněves Castle. It was created by complete reconstruction of an old aristocratic residence in 1661, then it was rebuilt in the Baroque style in 1674–1676.

The Church of Saint Procopius was built in the Baroque style in 1707. It was built on the site of a Gothic church from 1384, which was destroyed by the Hussites in 1425. In the village of Žíželeves there is the Church of Saint Nicholas, built in the late Baroque style in 1769–1776.

The birth house of Václav Hanka, who is the most famous local native, is now a museum.

== Notable people ==
- Jan Václav of Gallas (1669–1719), noble and diplomat
- Václav Hanka (1791–1861), philologist
- Josef Prokop Pražák (1870–1904), ornithologist
