= Chrudoš =

Czech male given name

Chrudoš is a male first name, derived from the Czech word chruditi ("weaken"); therefore, Chrudoš literally means "boy who is weakened" and comes from the name Chrudim. It is mentioned in the Manuscripts of Dvůr Králové and of Zelená Hora (19th century). The name day is celebrated on 22 or 23 January or 25 October.

== Nicknames ==
Chruďa, Chrudík, Chrudko, Chrudošek, Došek, Chru

== Famous bearers ==
- Libuše, about brothers Chrudoš a Šťáhlav
