= Moravo, Moravo =

"Moravo, Moravo!" (Moravia, Moravia!) is a Czech patriotic song written at the end of the eighteenth century by Václav Hanka. It is considered an old Moravian folk song. Today it is sometimes used as an unofficial Moravian national anthem.
