= Karel Slavoj Amerling =

Czech writer (1807–1884)

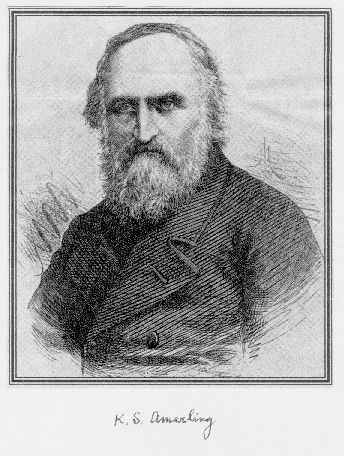
- Born: 18 September 1807; Klatovy, Austrian Empire
- Died: 2 November 1884 (aged 77); Prague, Austria-Hungary
- Resting place: Budeč cemetery
- Other names: Karl Slavomil Amerling; Slavoj Strnad Klatovský; Carolus Amerling
- Spouse: Františka Svatava Michalovicová

Karel Slavoj Amerling (also known as Karl Slavomil Amerling; pen name Slavoj Strnad Klatovský; 18 September 1807 – 2 November 1884) was a Czech teacher, writer and philosopher.

== Biography ==
Amerling was born in Klatovy, and was the son of a wealthy baker. After he studied philosophy in Vienna, he worked two years as a governor. Then he studied medicine in Prague, but he was also interested in philosophy, theology, mineralogy, and biology. In 1836 he earned his degree, and went on to become a secretary of Earl A. Šternberk, but had to leave this post due to illness. Later, he became a doctor in Prague.

On 25 July 1840 he founded the Budeč institute, which combined the functions of several institutions. On the ground floor were workshops, and laboratories. The first floor was designed to educate future teachers. The second floor was primarily used for music education, but also had an extensive library with a printing press, which could print many alphabets including Cyrillic, and Egyptian hieroglyphs. There was also a clockmaker workshop, and a stone cutter workshop. An extensive natural science collection could also be found on this floor. The third floor was a hospital. There was also a tower which served as an astronomical observatory, and a meteorological station.

In 1847 he married Františka Svatava Michalovicová.

In 1848 he became the head of an institute for future educators, but was forced to leave due to political reasons in 1868. In 1870 he became the headmaster of the Prague Institute for Feeble-minded Children, and he remained in this position until he died on 2 November 1884 in Prague.

== See also ==
- Czech chemical nomenclature
- List of Czech writers
