= Dvůr Králové nad Labem =

- Town
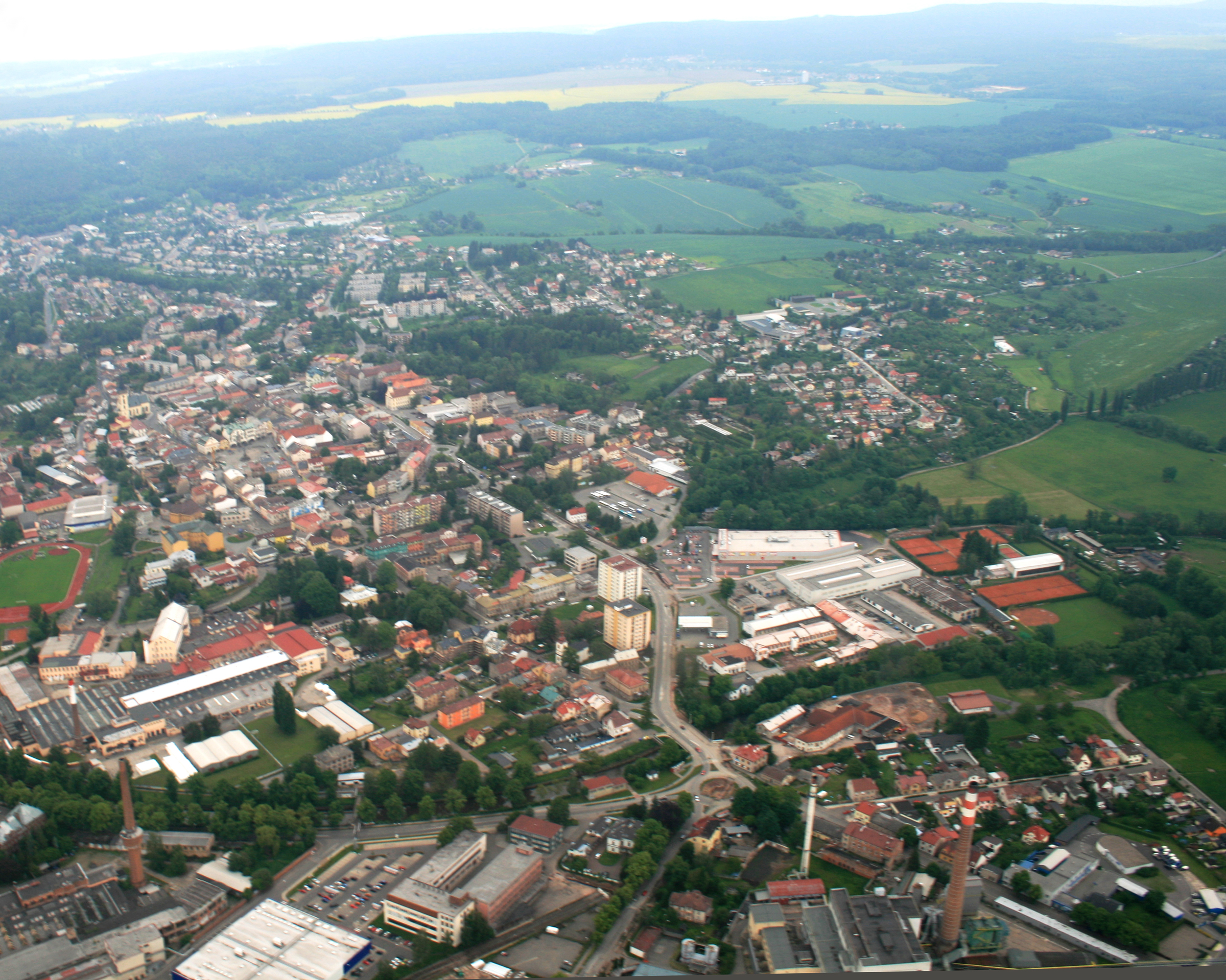
- Aerial view

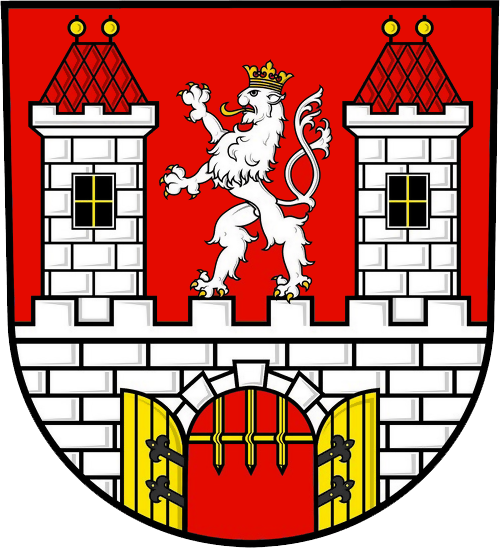
- Flag Coat of arms

- Location in the Czech Republic
- Coordinates: 50°25′59″N 15°48′44″E
- Country: Czech Republic
- Region: Hradec Králové
- District: Trutnov
- First mentioned: 1270

Government
  - Mayor: Vít Zlámal

Area
  - Total: 35.84 km^{2} (13.84 sq mi)
- Elevation: 298 m (978 ft)

Population (2026-01-01)
  - Total: 15,316
  - Density: 427.3/km^{2} (1,107/sq mi)
- Time zone: UTC+1 (CET)
  - Summer (DST): UTC+2 (CEST)
- Postal code: 544 01
- Website: www.mudk.cz

Dvůr Králové nad Labem (Czech pronunciation: [ˈdvuːr ˈkraːlovɛː ˈnad labɛm]; German: Königinhof an der Elbe) is a town in Trutnov District in the Hradec Králové Region of the Czech Republic. It has about 15,000 inhabitants. The town is located in the valley of the Elbe River.

In the Middle Ages, Dvůr Králové nad Labem was a dowry town, administered by the Bohemian queens. The historic town centre is well preserved and is protected as an urban monument zone. Dvůr Králové nad Labem is known for the Safari Park Dvůr Králové, one of the largest and most visited zoos in the country.

== Administrative division ==
Dvůr Králové nad Labem consists of six municipal parts (in brackets population according to the 2021 census):

- Dvůr Králové nad Labem (13,475)
- Lipnice (393)
- Verdek (211)
- Zboží (165)
- Žireč (481)
- Žirecká Podstráň (225)

== Etymology ==
In Czech, the town's name means 'queen's court on the Elbe'. It refers to its history, when it was owned by Bohemian queens, and its geographical location. It was originally named Dvůr; the name appeared as Curia in Latin in 1270, as Hof in German in 1318, and then as Dwuor in Old Czech in 1421.

== Geography ==
Dvůr Králové nad Labem is located about 16 kilometres (10 mi) southwest of Trutnov and 24 km (15 mi) north of Hradec Králové. It lies mostly in the eastern tip of the Jičín Uplands; the northern part of the municipal territory extends into the Giant Mountains Foothills. The highest point is the hill Záleský vrch at 459 m (1,506 ft) above sea level. The town is situated on both banks of the Elbe River, in the river valley.

== History ==
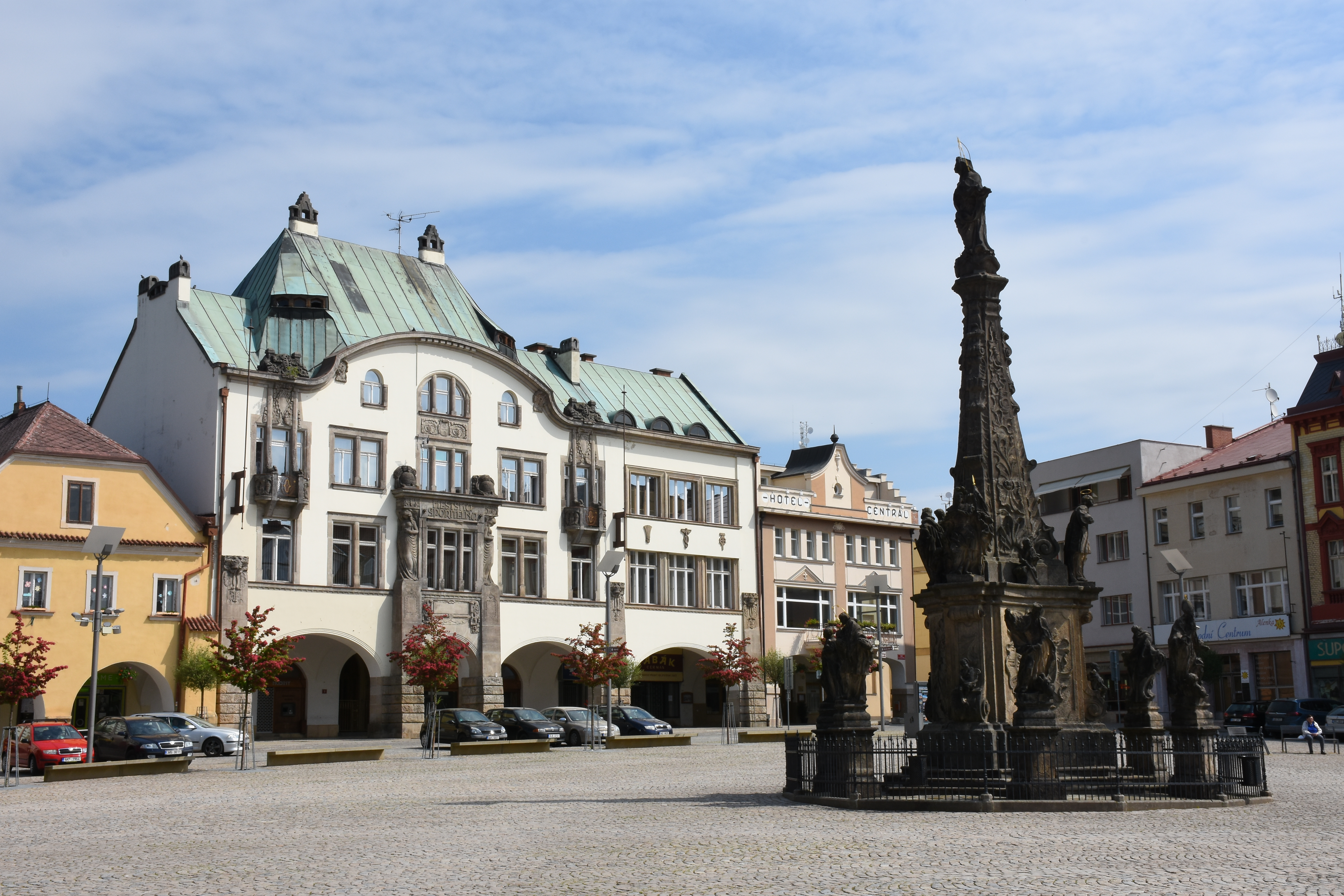
Náměstí T. G. Masaryka

The first written mention of Dvůr Králové nad Labem is from 1270. A settlement with a small church was founded as guard point on a military trail to Silesia probably in the second half of the 12th century. The settlement began to expand with colonisation of mostly German people. It is unknown when it was promoted to a town and became a royal property.

In the 14th century, the town was fortified. In 1392, King Wenceslaus IV signed the town over to his wife, Queen Sophia of Bavaria. Since then, it was a dowry town and called Dvůr Králové. In 1421, the town surrendered without a fight to the moderate wing of the Hussites. In 1436, it became again a dowry town managed by Queen Barbara of Cilli.

During the Thirty Years' War, Dvůr Králové was repeatedly looted and damaged, and experienced decline. It was also marked by War of the Austrian Succession, Seven Years' War and Austro-Prussian War. However, the town recovered thanks to textile crafts (weaving and dyeing), and became regional centre of trade and crafts. The industry further developed after the railway was built in 1858, the road network was improved, and the Elbe became navigable. In the 1880s, the first textile factories were established.

Until 1918, the town was part of Austria-Hungary, head of the Königshof an der Elbe – Dvůr Králové nad Labem District, one of the 94 Bezirkshauptmannschaften in Bohemia.

After World War II, the German inhabitants were expelled.

=== Manuscript affair ===
On 16 September 1817, Václav Hanka allegedly discovered a manuscript appearing to be from the 13th century in the tower of a local church. The Manuscript of Dvůr Kralové, probably in fact created by Hanka, was intended to help Czech patriots in the struggle against German culture. Although it has been proved to be most likely a counterfeit, it became an important part of the country's history.

== Demographics ==
Historical population

| Year | Pop. | ±% |
|---|---|---|
| 1869 | 8,365 | — |
| 1880 | 8,902 | +6.4% |
| 1890 | 10,898 | +22.4% |
| 1900 | 13,201 | +21.1% |
| 1910 | 17,766 | +34.6% |

| Year | Pop. | ±% |
|---|---|---|
| 1921 | 15,615 | −12.1% |
| 1930 | 18,839 | +20.6% |
| 1950 | 16,083 | −14.6% |
| 1961 | 16,904 | +5.1% |
| 1970 | 16,828 | −0.4% |

| Year | Pop. | ±% |
|---|---|---|
| 1980 | 17,911 | +6.4% |
| 1991 | 16,976 | −5.2% |
| 2001 | 16,381 | −3.5% |
| 2011 | 15,754 | −3.8% |
| 2021 | 14,950 | −5.1% |

Source: Censuses

== Economy ==
The largest employer based in Dvůr Králové nad Labem is Juta with more than 2,000 employees. The company was founded here in 1946 as jute and hemp processor and followed up on tradition of textile industry. Today it focuses on technical fabrics and synthetic products.

== Transport ==
Dvůr Králové nad Labem is located on the railway line Liberec–Pardubice.

== Sights ==
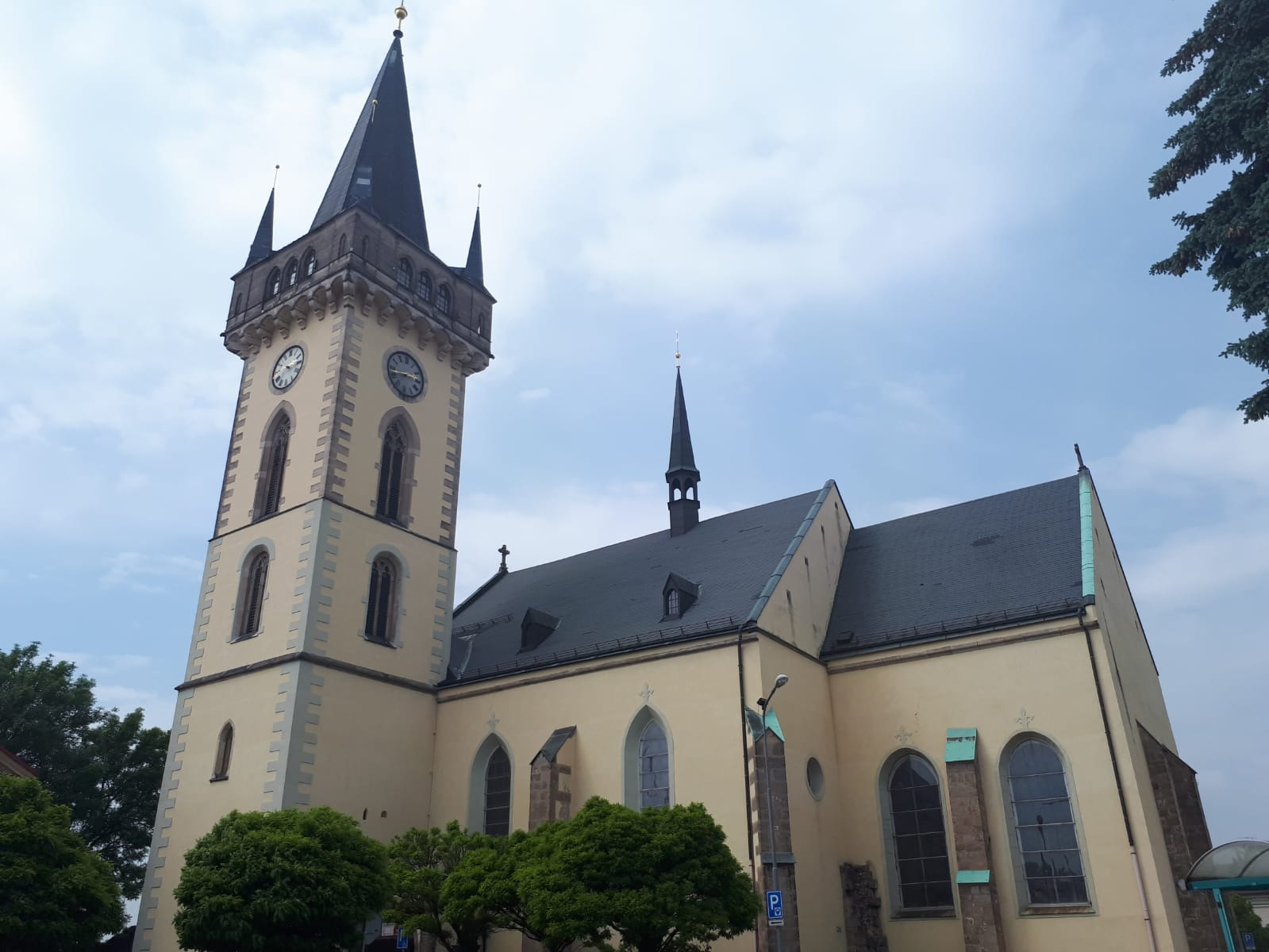
Church of Saint John the Baptist

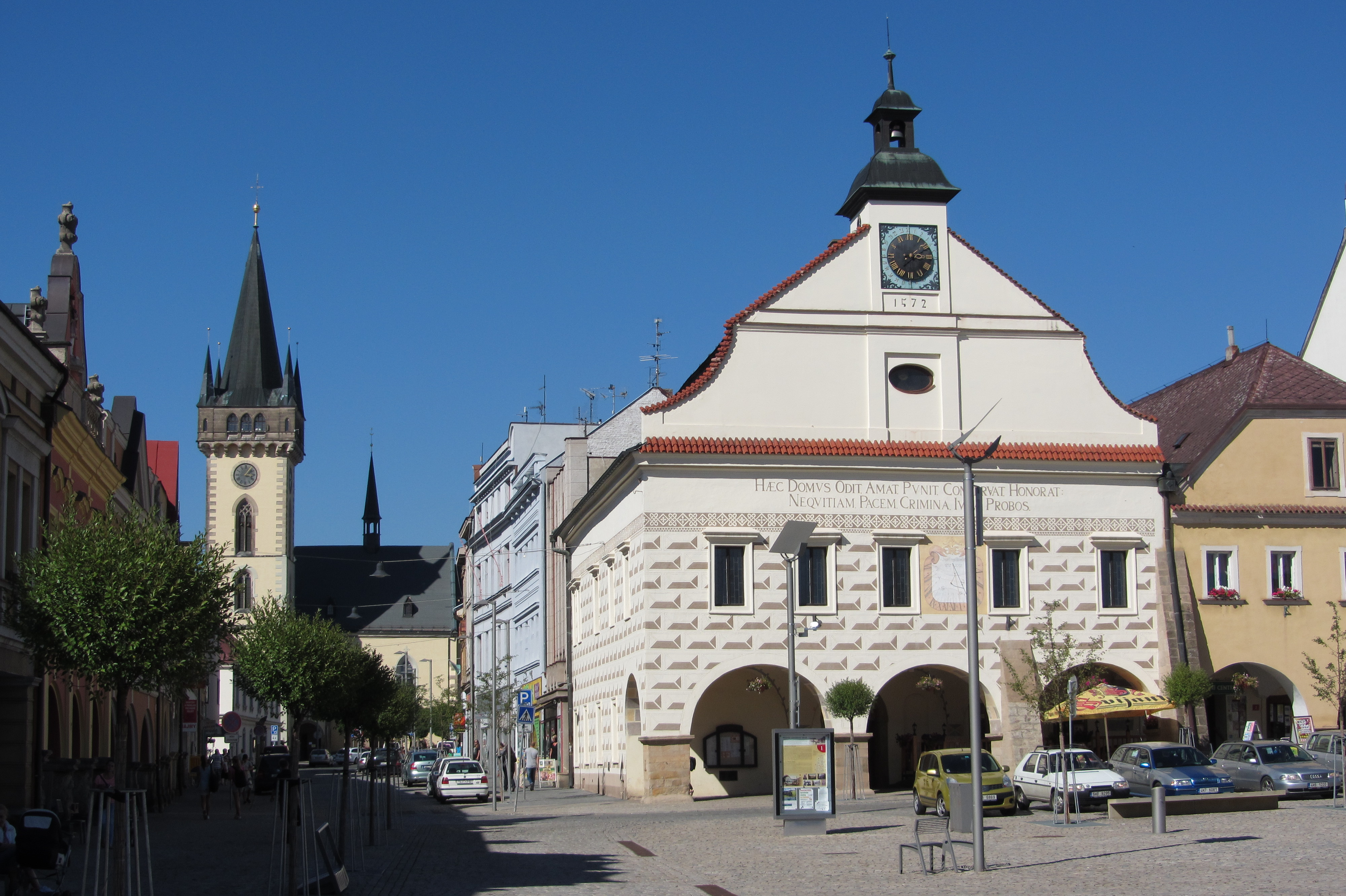
Old Town Hall

The most important historical monument is the Church of Saint John the Baptist. It was built in the Gothic style on the site of the original Romanesque church. The tower was added in 1644 and its present appearance is from the reconstructions in the 1890s.

The historic core is formed by the square Náměstí T. G. Masaryka. Its main landmark is the Renaissance Old Town Hall. It was built in 1833, after the original building from 1572 burned down in 1790. It has arcades and decorative façade. Other sights of the square include the Art Nouveau savings bank built in 1909–1910, a Baroque marian column from 1754, and a fountain from 1857.

The town is home to Safari Park Dvůr Králové which features an African safari theme and houses more than 3,300 animals representing around 400 species, primarily African hoofstock. The zoo participates in breeding programs for several endangered species and is one of the region's major tourist attractions.

A notable building in Dvůr Králové nad Labem-Žireč is the former residence of the Jesuits. Originally a Renaissance fortress from the 16th century, it was rebuilt and extended in the early Baroque style. Today, it houses a social residential facility for patients with multiple sclerosis.

== Notable people ==
- Ferdinand Albin Pax (1858–1942), botanist
- Otto Gutfreund (1889–1927), sculptor
- Karl Freund (1890–1969), German-American cameraman of the silent film era
- Rudolf Antonín Dvorský (1899–1966), musician, songwriter
- Jan Zdeněk Bartoš (1908–1981), composer
- Ladislav Lubina (1967–2021), ice hockey player and coach
- Martin Šonka (born 1978), aerobatics and fighter pilot
- Gabriela Martinovová (born 1981), alpine skier
- Karolína Grohová (born 1990), cross-country skier
- Josef Král (born 1990), racing driver

== Twin towns – sister cities ==
Dvůr Králové nad Labem is twinned with:

- Bushtyno, Ukraine
- Kamienna Góra, Poland
- Kowary, Poland
- Piegaro, Italy
- Verneuil-en-Halatte, France
