= Emil Votoček =

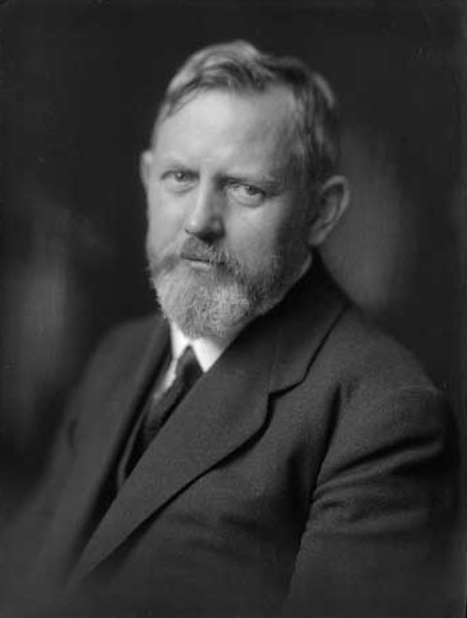
- Emil Votoček
- Born: 5 October 1872; Hostinné, Austria-Hungary
- Died: 11 October 1950 (aged 78); Prague, Czechoslovakia
- Education: Czech Institute of Technology, College of Mulhouse, University of Göttingen
- Scientific career
- Workplaces: Czech Institute of Technology
- Doctoral advisor: Bernhard Tollens
- Doctoral students: Vladimir Prelog, Otto Wichterle

Emil Votoček (5 October 1872 – 11 October 1950) was a Czech chemist, composer and music theorist. He is noted for his chemistry textbooks and multilingual dictionaries in both chemistry and music.

== Chemistry career ==
Votoček studied at the Czech Institute of Technology later in Mulhouse and received his PhD with Bernhard Tollens at the University of Göttingen for his chemistry of sugar.

In 1895 he returned to the Czech Institute of Technology where he became lecturer and professor in 1907. His academic career ended with the closure of the institute by the Nazis in 1939. He held six honorary doctorates and was an honorary member of various corporations and societies.

== Music career ==
His chemistry career kept him from doing anything about his interest in music until the age of thirty. Then he studied music with František Špilka for six years. But his other work again intervened, for a further 25 years. From his early 60s through to his mid 70s, he wrote about 60 works, including five orchestral works, much chamber music, piano sonatas and pieces, and songs. He also compiled a Czech dictionary of French and Italian musical terms.

== Selected publications ==
- O derivatech karbazolu (1896)
- Kondensace methylfurola s floroglucinem (1897)
- O stanovení methylovaných pentos (1897)
- Ueber das Verhalten der Hydrazine zu dem photographischen Lichtbilde (1899)
- Cvičení v chemii organické (Exercises in Organic Chemistry) (1899–1901)
- Chemie anorganická (Inorganic Chemistry) (1902)
- O antipodii rhodeosy a fukosy (1904)
- O konfiguraci rhodeosy (1907)
- Chemie organická (Organic Chemistry) (1927)
- Česko-francouzská konversace a fraseologie (1938)
- Chemický slovník (Chemistry Dictionary), Czech-German-French-English-Italian-Latin (1941)
- Hudební slovník cizích výrazů a rčení (Music Dictionary of Foreign Words and Phrases) (1946)

== Selected compositions ==
Votoček wrote approximately 70 music compositions.

- Fantasie for viola and piano (1943)
- Od svítání do soumraku (From Dawn to Dusk) for orchestra
- Suita for viola and piano
- Téma s variacemi pro klavír a soprán (Theme and Variations) for piano and soprano (1934); final variation with soprano solo; words by Jaroslav Vrchlický
- Tři ballatine (3 Ballatines) for viola and piano (published 1945)

== See also ==
- Alexander Borodin
