= Václav Hanka =

Czech philologist (1791–1861)

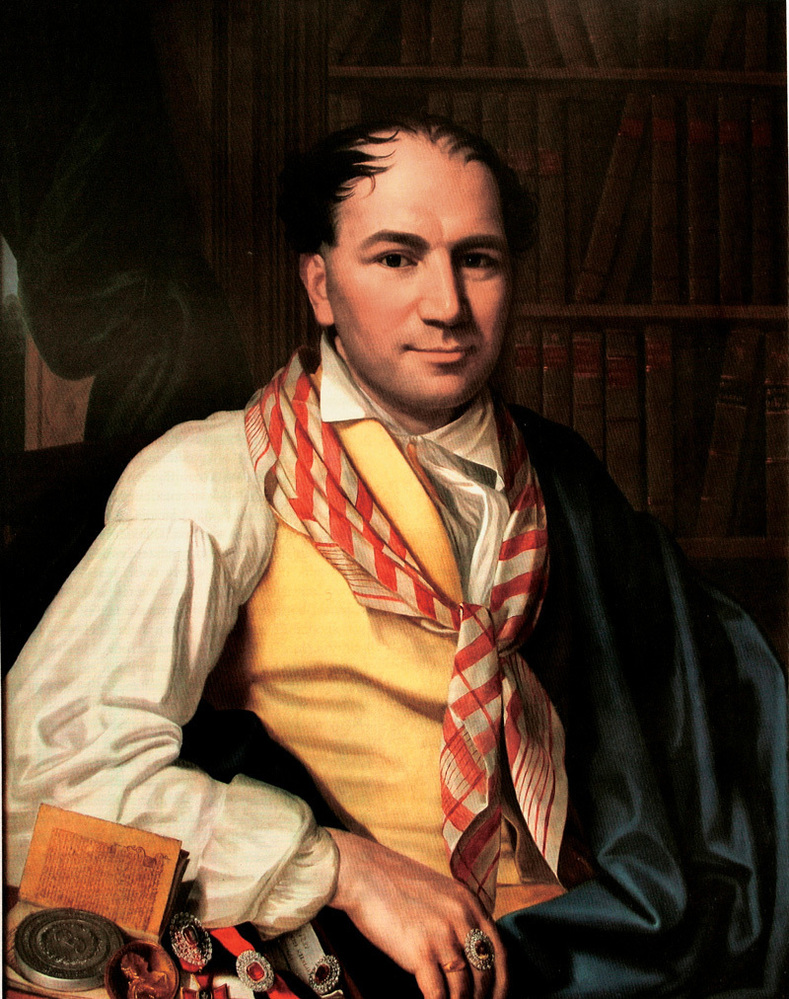
- Portrait by Antonín Machek, 1821
- Born: 10 June 1791; Hořiněves, Bohemia
- Died: 12 January 1861 (aged 69); Prague, Bohemia, Austrian Empire
- Resting place: Vyšehrad Cemetery
- Other names: Wenceslaus Hanka; Váceslav Váceslavič
- Education: University of Prague
- Occupation: Philologist
- Notable work: Dvůr Králové Manuscript
- Awards: Order of Saint Anna, 3rd class

Signature
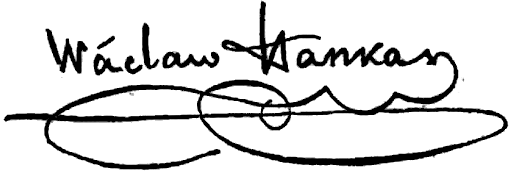

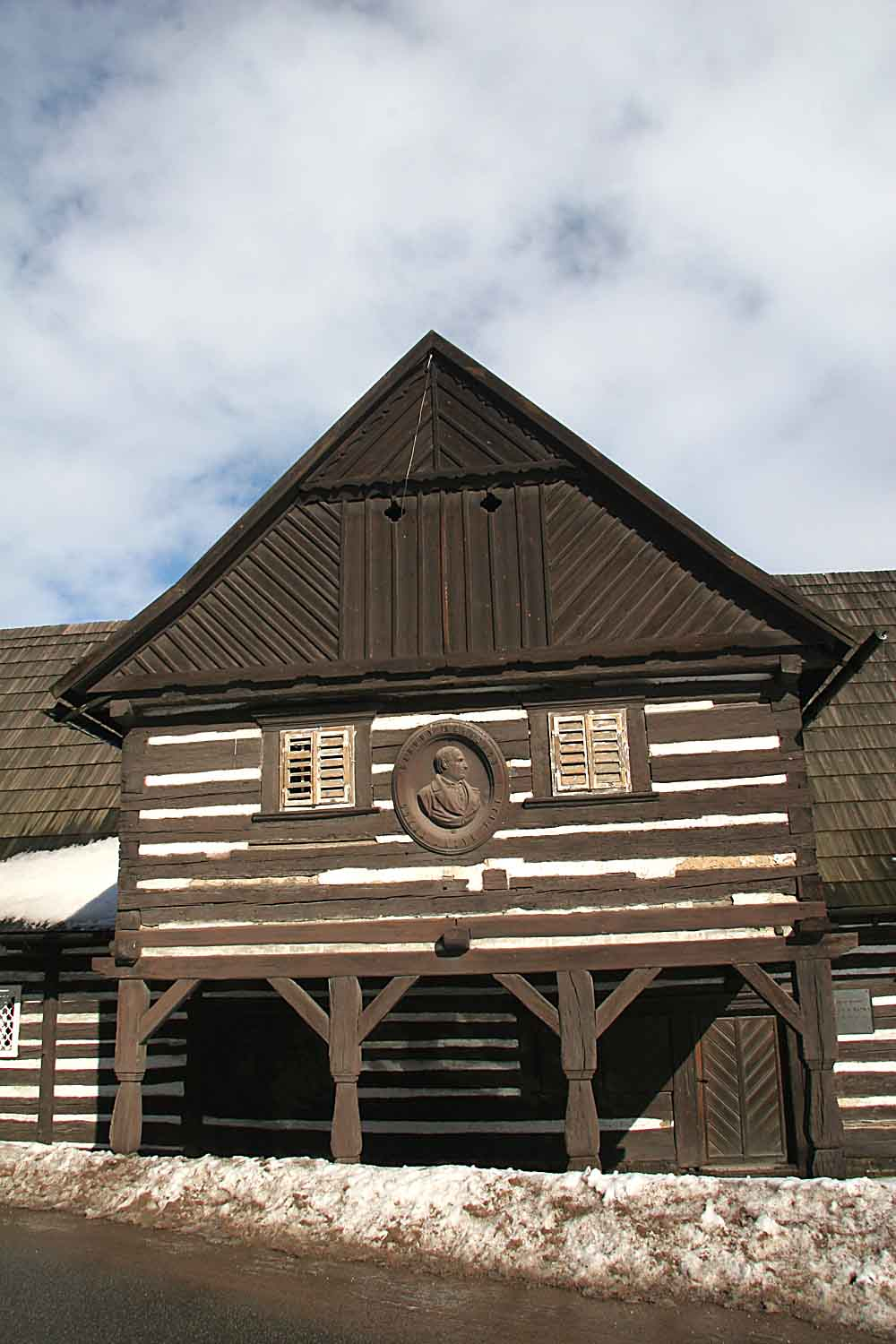
Wooden inn from about 1720 where Hanka was born

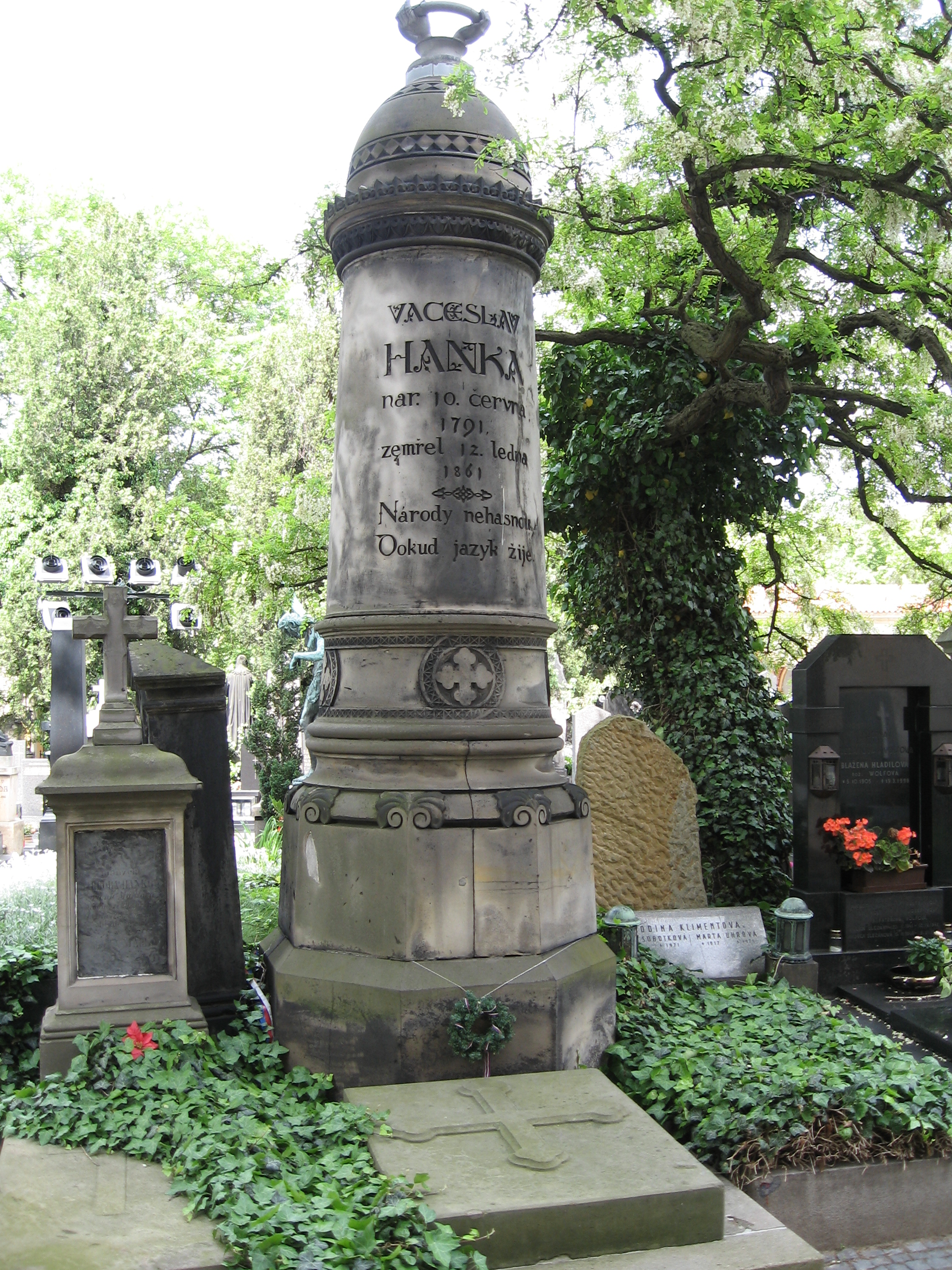
Hanka's grave in Vyšehrad Cemetery

Václav Hanka (Note: Alternatively anglicised as "Wenceslaus Hanka" and russified as "Váceslav Váceslavič") (10 June 1791 – 12 January 1861) was a Czech philologist, poet and literary historian. Today he is known primarily as the probable counterfeiter of the Dvůr Králové Manuscript, which he allegedly found. He contributed to the Czech National Revival.

== Biography ==
Hanka was born at Hořiněves near Hradec Králové. He was sent in 1807 to school at Hradec Králové, to escape the conscription, then to the University of Prague (present-day, Charles University), where he founded a society for the cultivation of the Czech language. At Vienna, where he afterwards studied law, he established a Czech periodical; and in 1813 he made the acquaintance of Josef Dobrovský, an eminent philologist.

On 16 September 1817, Hanka claimed that he had discovered some manuscripts of 13th- and 14th-century Bohemian poems in the church tower of the town of Dvůr Králové nad Labem and later some more at Zelená Hora Castle near Nepomuk. The Manuscripts of Dvůr Králové and Zelená Hora were made public in 1818, with a German translation by Swoboda. The originals were presented by him to newly founded National Museum at Prague, of which he was appointed librarian in the same year. Great doubt, however, was felt as to their genuineness, and Dobrovský, by pronouncing the latter manuscript (also known as The Judgment of Libuše), to be an obvious fraud, confirmed the suspicion. Some years afterwards Dobrovský saw fit to modify his decision, but modern Czech scholars regard the manuscript as a forgery. A translation into English, The Manuscript of the Queen's Court, was made by Albert Henry Wratislaw in 1852.

In 1846 Hanka edited the Reims Gospel and made it available to the general public, for which he received the cross of the Order of St. Anna by the Tsar Nicholas I and a brilliant ring by Emperor Ferdinand I.

In 1848 Hanka, who was an ardent pan-Slavist, took part at the Prague Slavic Congress, 1848 and other peaceful national demonstrations, being the founder of the political society Slovanská lípa ("Slavonic Linden"). He was elected to the Imperial Diet at Vienna, but declined to take his seat. In the winter of 1848 he became lecturer and in 1849 professor of Slavonic languages in the University of Prague.

He died in Prague on 12 January 1861 at the age of 70.

== Works ==
His chief works and editions are the following:

- Hankowy Pjsne (Prague, 1815), a volume of poems
- Starobyla Skiadani (1817–1826), in 5 vols, a collection of old Bohemian poems, chiefly from unpublished manuscripts
- A Short History of the Slavonic Peoples (1818)
- A Bohemian Grammar (1822)
- A Polish Grammar (1839) (these two grammars were composed on a plan suggested by Dobrovský)
- Igor (1821), an ancient Russian epic, with a translation into Bohemian
- Počátky Posvátného Jazyka Slovanského (1846)
- Сазаво - Еммауское Святое Благовѣствованіе (1846), an edition of the Glagolitic Reims Gospel
- the old Bohemian Chronicles of Delimit (1848)
- History of Charles IV, by Procop Luph (1848)
- Evangelium Ostromis (1853)
- Hanka also composed the song Moravo, Moravo!, sometimes used as a Moravian national anthem.
