= Czech National Revival =

Cultural movement in the 18th and 19th centuries

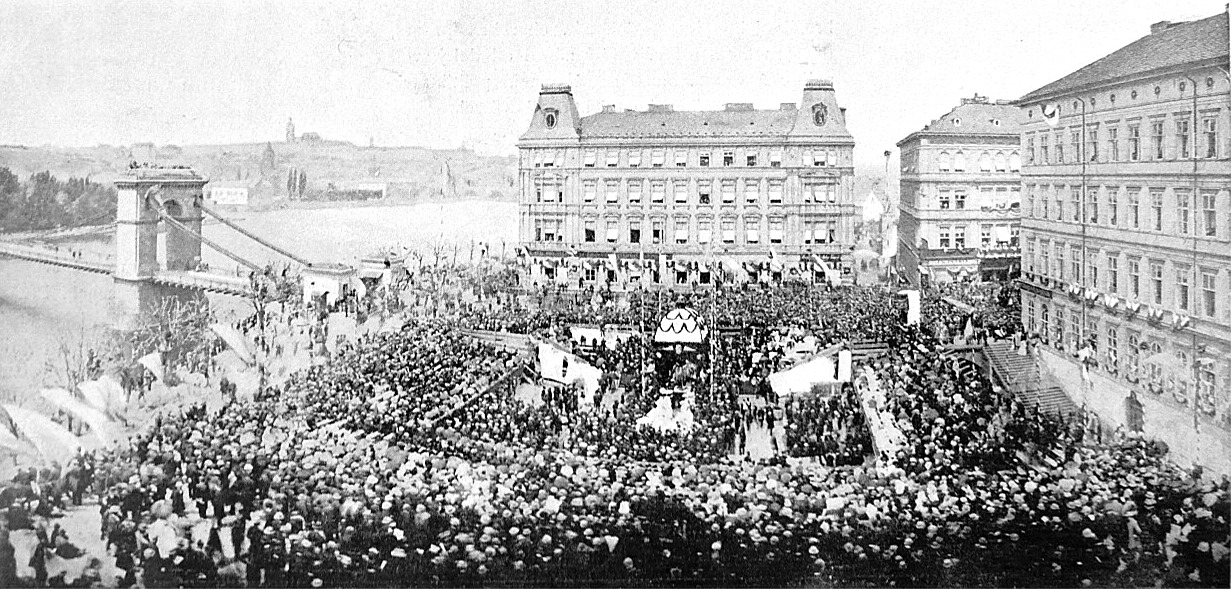
Ceremonial laying of the foundation stone of the National Theatre, 1868

The Czech National Revival was a cultural movement spanning the 18th and 19th centuries within the Czech lands. Its primary objective was to resurrect the Czech language, culture, and national identity, combating pervasive Germanisation and reclaiming the distinct heritage eroded by centuries of the Ostsiedlung. Among the movement's most influential pioneers were Josef Dobrovský and Josef Jungmann.

== Background ==
Following the Battle of White Mountain in 1620, the Czech lands were subjected to systematic Germanisation policies spearheaded by the Habsburg emperors. This intensified a centuries-long trajectory of demographic shift, driven by German migration into the region. Consequently, several territories evolved into fully Germanised enclaves with German majorities, regions later designated as the Sudetenland. Even outside of the Sudetenland, cities such as Prague, Brno, and Olomouc functioned largely as German-speaking prior to the inception of the cultural revival.

The oppression was also connected with religion – about one half of the inhabitants of Bohemia were Protestants (see Hussite) when the Habsburgs took power. The Habsburgs started rampant anti-Reformation and re-Catholicization efforts which made some Czech elites flee the country. This violent re-Catholicization has been suggested to be one of the reasons behind today's widespread Czech atheism.

During the two following centuries, Czech language had been more or less eradicated from state administration, literature, schools, Charles University, and among the upper classes, having been replaced by German. Large numbers of books written in Czech were burned for confessional reasons. For example, Jesuit Antonín Koniáš alone is credited with burning as many as 30,000 Czech-language books. Gradually, Czech was reduced to a means of communication between peasants, who were often illiterate. Therefore, the revival looked for inspiration among ordinary Czechs in the countryside.

== Milestones ==
Josef Dobrovský published his Czech grammar book in 1809. In 1817, Václav Hanka claimed to have discovered medieval Manuscripts of Dvůr Králové and Zelená Hora, which were decades later proven as Hanka's and Linda's forgeries.

Josef Jungmann published the five-volume Czech-German dictionary in 1834–1839. It was a major lexicographical work, which had a great formative influence on Czech. Jungmann used vocabulary of the Bible of Kralice (1579–1613) period and of the language used by his contemporaries. He borrowed words not present in Czech from other Slavic languages or created neologisms. He also inspired development of Czech scientific terminology, thus making it possible for original Czech research to develop.

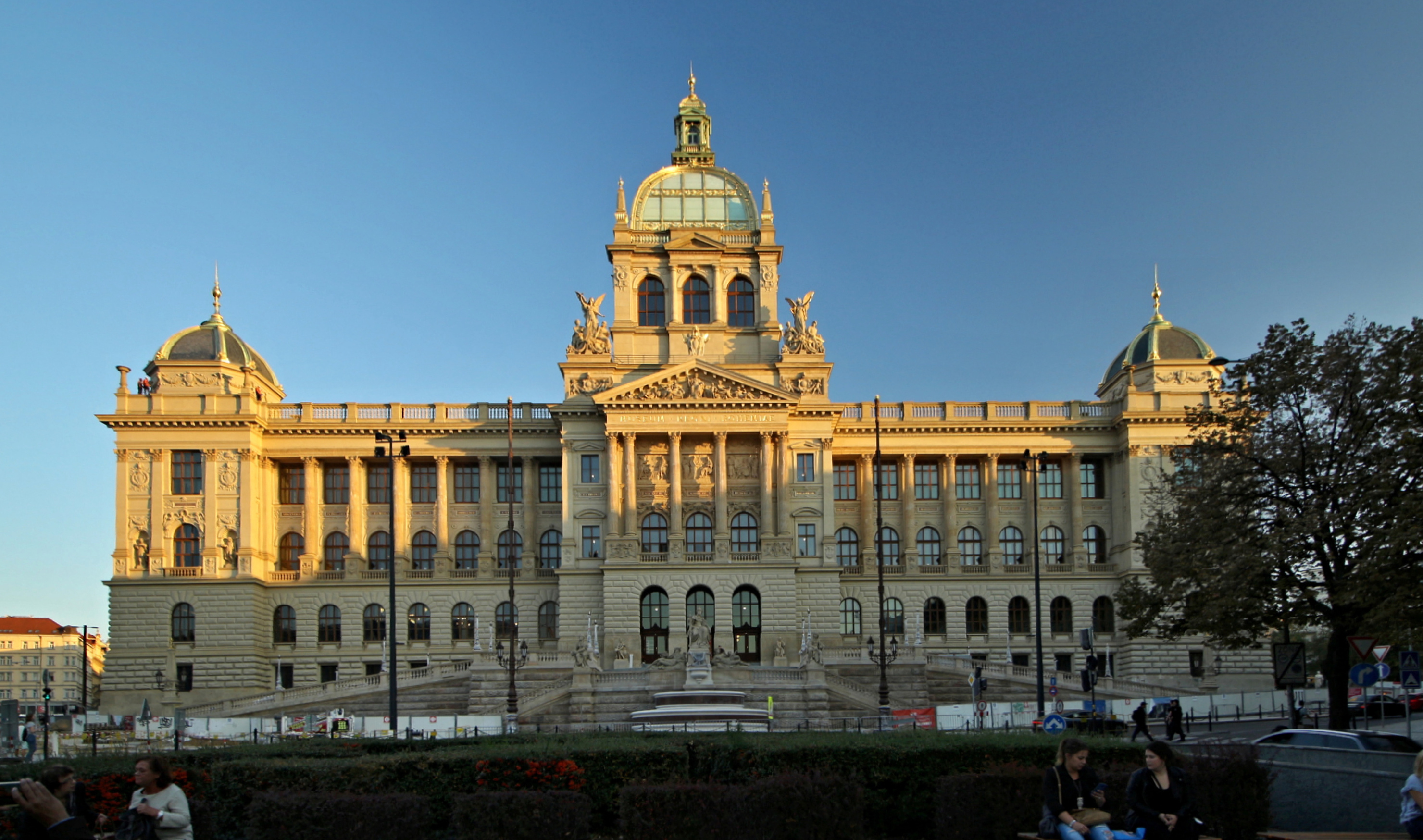
National Museum in Prague, an important institution of the Revival

This work was published by the Matice česká, an institution created by František Palacký in 1831 as a branch of the National Museum. The Matice became an important institution as it was at the time one of the few routes through which works in Czech could be published. In 1832 it took over the publication of the journal of the Bohemian Museum. This journal was important as it provided a forum for the Czech intelligentsia to publish their ideas in their own language, in contrast to the journal published by the Royal Bohemian Academy of Sciences, which was published in German.

With the renaissance of language, Czech culture flourished. Czech institutions were established to celebrate Czech history and culture. The National Theatre opened in 1883 and the National Museum in 1818. The foundations were financially supported by the nobility, industrialists, as well as the Habsburg emperors.

== Literature of the Revival ==
At the beginning of the Revival, written works focused more on developing the language and culture. Artistic works became more common towards the later phase of the Revival and it is in this period that some of the defining works of Czech Literature appeared.

Possibly as a consequence of the domination of urban society by the German-speaking population at the start of the century, Czech writers of the period often looked to the countryside for inspiration. In a similar fashion to how the Brothers Grimm recorded German folklore, Karel Jaromír Erben wrote Prostonárodní české písně a říkadla (Czech Folk Songs and Nursery Rhymes) which brought together various folktales. The countryside was looked to as the true Bohemia, where Czech folklore and traditions had survived away from the foreign influences of the cities. This can be seen in the work of Božena Němcová, whose novel The Grandmother explores life in a rural East Bohemian village.

== Results ==
The Czech language was ultimately revived, ascending to the language of the intelligentsia, literature, and following the creation of Czechoslovakia in 1918, the internal language of bureaucracy. Today, Czech serves as the official language of the Czech Republic. However, due to the Revivalists' reverence for the archaic language of the Kralice Bible, which they utilised as the definitive model for their grammar and dictionaries, a gap emerged between the everyday, colloquial language and the learned language of literature. This linguistic divide persists to a lesser extent today.

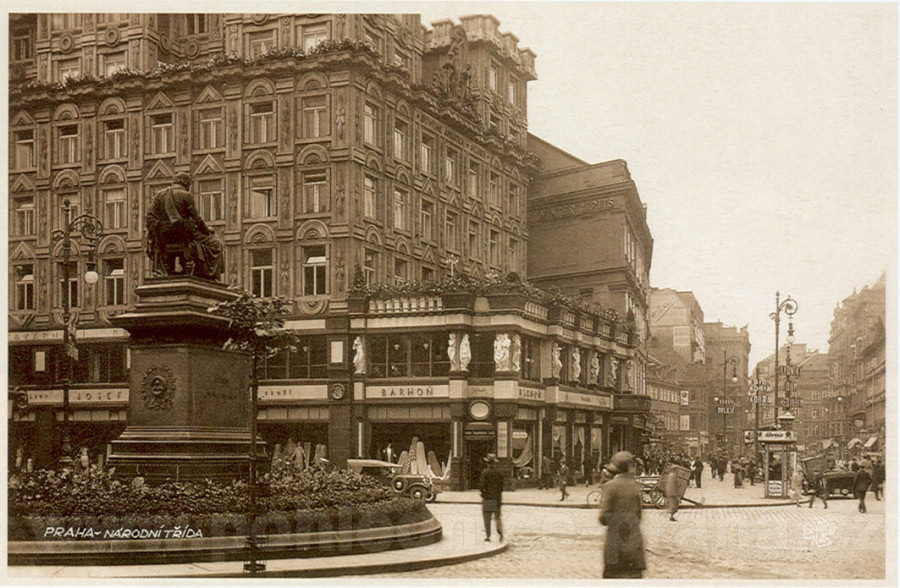
Monument of Josef Jungmann in Prague

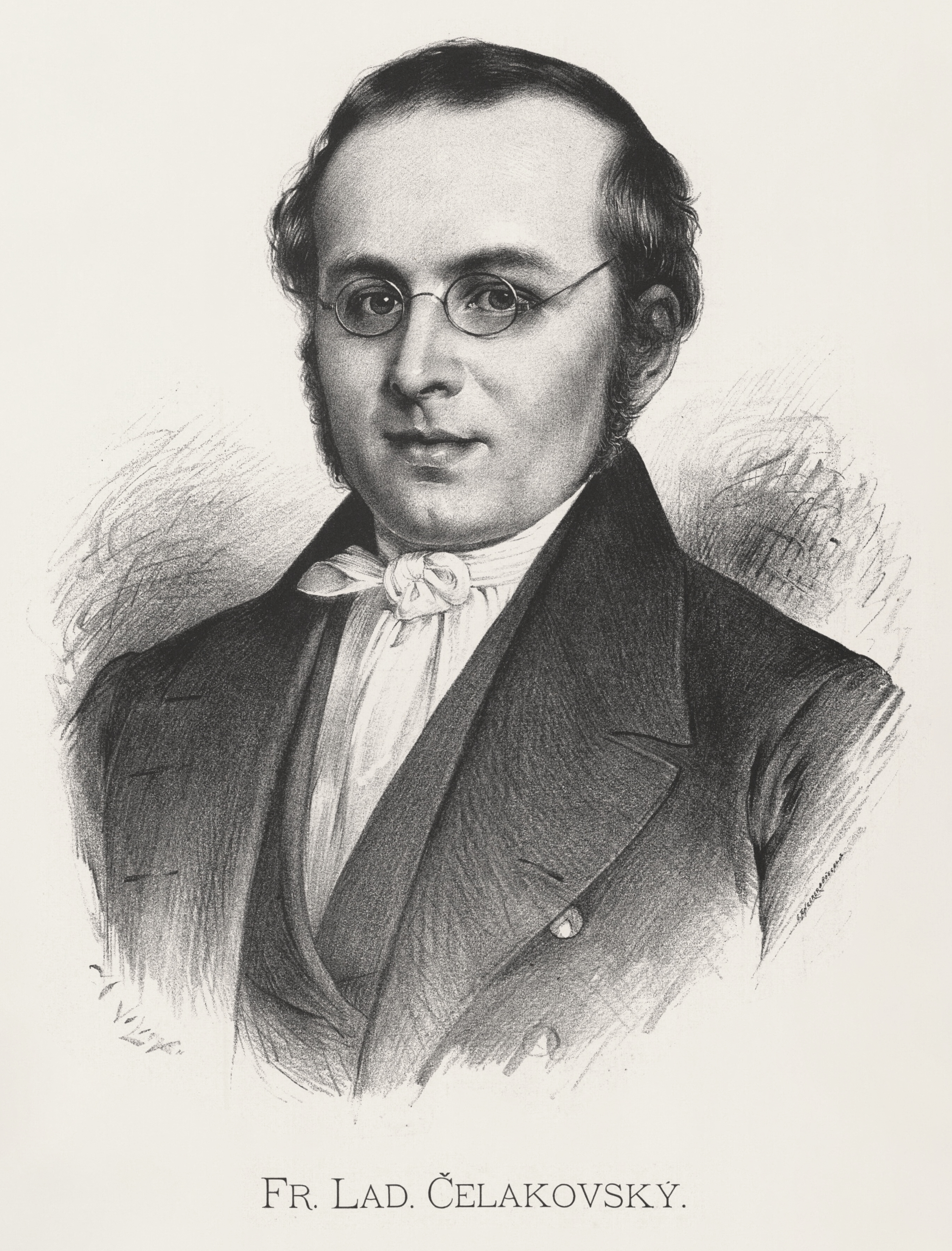
František Ladislav Čelakovský (1799–1852)

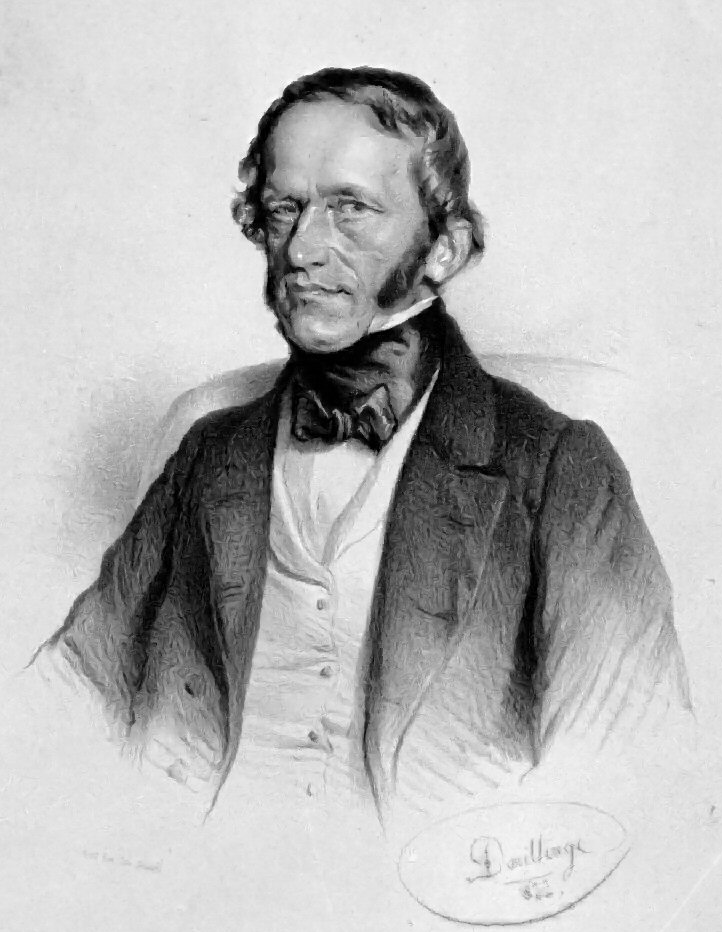
František Palacký (1798–1876)

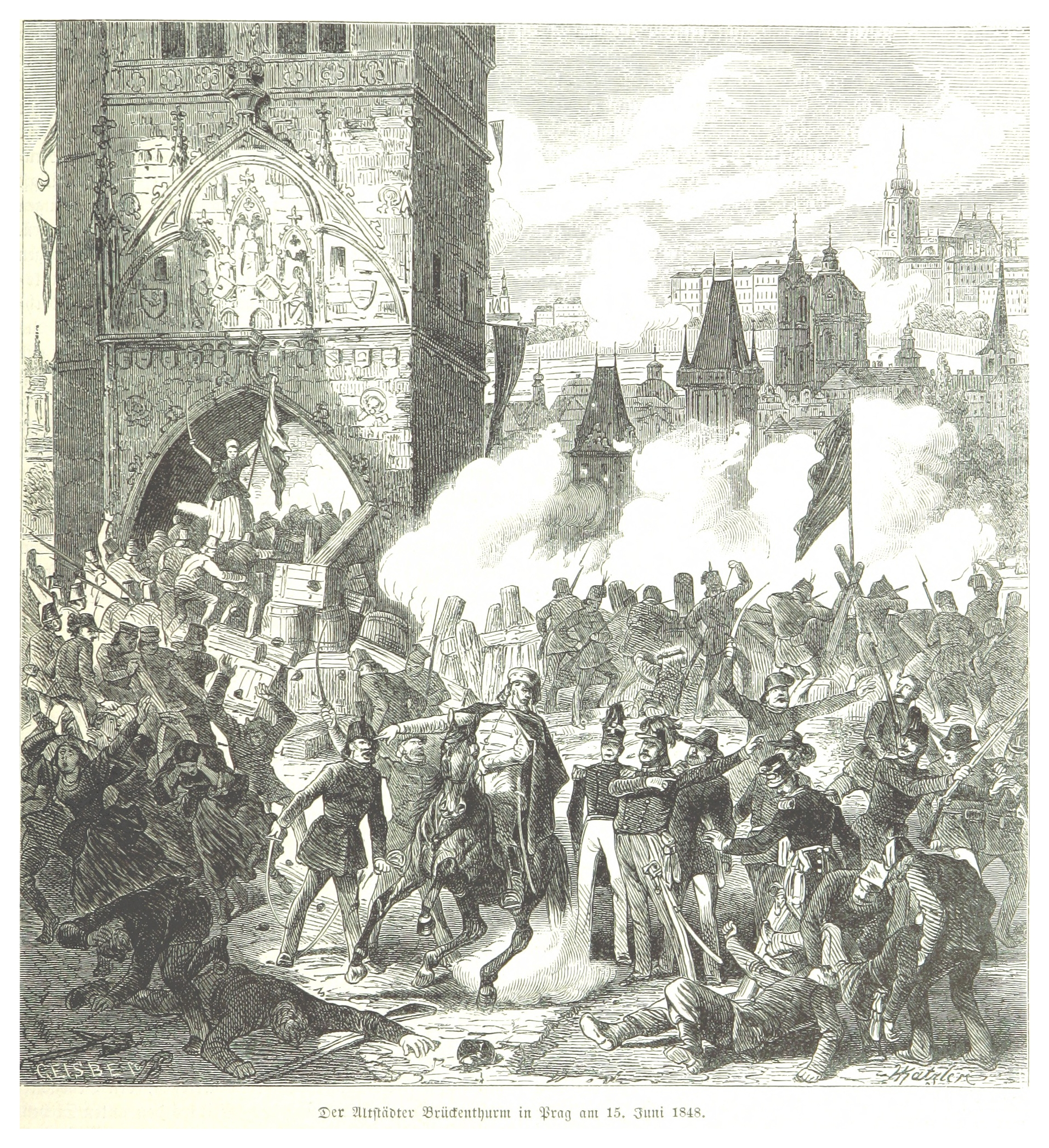
June Revolution in Prague (1848)

== See also ==
- Czech chemical nomenclature
