= Chemické Listy =

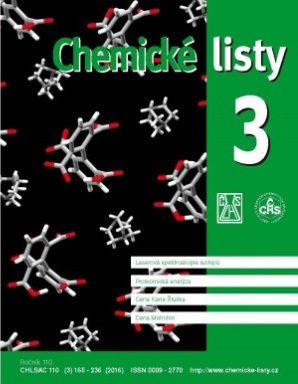
- Discipline: Chemistry, chemistry education
- Language: Czech, English, Slovak
- Edited by: Vlastimil Vyskočil

Publication details
- History: 1876–present
- Publisher: Czech Chemical Society (Czech Republic)
- Frequency: Monthly
- Impact factor: 0.6 (2022)

Standard abbreviations
- ISO 4: Chem. Listy

Indexing
- CODEN: CHLSAC
- ISSN: 0009-2770 (print); 1213-7103 (web)
- LCCN: 53032710
- OCLC no.: 613060406

Links
- Journal homepage; Online archive

Chemické Listy (literally Chemical Sheets) is a monthly peer-reviewed scientific journal covering chemistry and published by the Czech Chemical Society as the journal of the Association of Czech Chemical Societies. Languages of publication are Czech and Slovak; English manuscripts can only be submitted upon invitation. The journal was established in 1876 by Karel Preis (Prague Polytechnic). The journal was initially focused on practical and technical chemistry but, after 1882, scientific contributions began to dominate. In 1922, Jaroslav Heyrovský (Nobel laureate, 1959) first published in Chemické Listy the basic principle of polarography: "Electrolysis With a Dropping Mercury Cathode".

== Editors-in-chief ==
The following persons are or have been editors-in-chief of the journal:

- 1876–1907 Karel Preis
- 1908–1926 Josef Hanuš
- 1927–1945 Otakar Webr
- 1946–1951 Josef Koštíř
- 1952–1954 Josef Rudinger
- 1955–1957 Blahoslav Sedláček
- 1958 Miloš Kraus
- 1959–1996 Jiří Gut
- 1996–2011 Bohumil Kratochvíl
- 2012–2015 Pavel Chuchvalec
- 2016–2020 Bohumil Kratochvíl
- 2021–present Vlastimil Vyskočil

== Abstracting and indexing ==
The journal is abstracted and indexed in Chemical Abstracts, Current Contents/Physical, Chemical & Earth Sciences, Science Citation Index, and Scopus. According to the Journal Citation Reports, the journal has a 2022 impact factor of 0.6.
