= Manuscripts of Dvůr Králové and Zelená Hora =

19th-century Czech forgeries

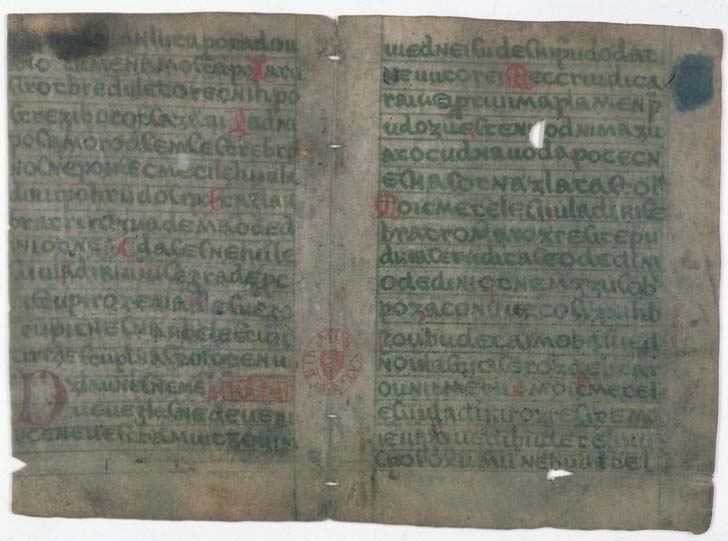
Pages 4 and 5 of the Zelená Hora Manuscript

The Dvůr Králové and Zelená Hora manuscripts (Czech: Rukopis královédvorský, RK, and Rukopis zelenohorský, RZ, (Note: Sometimes referred to collectively as RKZ) German: Königinhofer Handschrift and Grünberger Handschrift) are literary hoaxes purporting to be epic Slavic manuscripts written in Old Czech. They first appeared in the early 19th century.

There were early suspicions about their authenticity, but they were not decisively established to be forgeries until 1886 in a series of articles in Tomáš Masaryk's Athenaeum magazine.

== The two manuscripts ==
=== Dvůr Králové Manuscript ===
Václav Hanka claimed that he discovered the Dvůr Králové Manuscript (also called the "Königinhof Manuscript" in older literature) in 1817 in the Church of Saint John the Baptist at Dvůr Králové nad Labem in Bohemia. The original Old Czech text was published by Hanka in 1818, and a German version appeared the next year. (Note: The publication of the German version was aided by Václav Alois Svoboda)

=== Zelená Hora Manuscript ===
The second manuscript, which came to be known as the Zelená Hora Manuscript (also called the "Grünberg Manuscript" in older literature) named after Zelená Hora Castle, where it was purportedly discovered in 1817.

It had been mailed anonymously in 1818 (Note: Morfill in Westminster Review says it was sent in 1817. At any rate, it reached its destination in November 1818.) to Franz, Count Kolowrat-Liebsteinsky at the Bohemian Museum. The Count was Lord High Castellan of Prague and backer of the newly founded museum.

It was later revealed that the sender was Josef Kovář who served as administrator of the manorial income to Hieronymus Karl Graf von Colloredo-Mansfeld, the owner of Zelená Hora Castle. Kovář allegedly discovered the manuscript at his master's castle in Nepomuk in 1817.

It was not until 1858 that Kovář's role in publicizing this manuscript was publicly revealed by Václav Vladivoj Tomek. Although Kovář had died in 1834, Tomek, through interviewing Father Václav Krolmus, was able to confirm that Kovář was the one who had originally sent the manuscript. Following Tomek's revelation, the work, which had sometimes been referred to as the Libušin soud Manuscript, after the poem it contained, came to be consistently called Zelená Hora Manuscript.

== Contents ==
The Dvůr Králové Manuscript contained 14 poems, out of which 6 were epics, 2 were lyric epics, and 6 were love songs. Záboj and Slavoj, two invented warrior-poets, feature in the epics.

The Zelená Hora Manuscript contained two poems, the "Sněmy" ("The Assemblies") and "Libušin soud" ("Lubuše's Verdict").

A multilingual edition of the Dvůr Králové Manuscript (with other poems) appeared in 1843; this edition included John Bowring's English translation. (Note: Bowring says in his foreword that he included "Lubuše's Verdict", p. 281, but this text seems to be missing.)

Later, "Lubuše's Verdict" and some of the poetry from the Dvůr Králové Manuscript were translated into English by Albert Henry Wratislaw and published in 1852. (Note: There were two editions. The Prague edition of 1852 contained many typographical errors, compared with the 1852 Cambridge and London edition.)

== Response ==
When the first manuscript appeared, it was touted as a major discovery. But when the second manuscript appeared, it was pronounced a forgery by Josef Dobrovský. Jernej Kopitar seconded this opinion, accusing Hanka of being the author of the hoax. Many of the important Czech writers at the time, however, supported the manuscripts' authenticity including dictionary compiler and author of a Czech literary history Josef Jungmann, writer František Čelakovský, historian František Palacký, and poet-folklorist Karel Jaromír Erben.

In England, John Bowring, who was a translator of Slavonic poetry, had dealings with authorities on both sides of the debate. When he first sought suitable Czech material, he approached Kopitar, who recommended Dobrovský as someone who could provide an appropriate list of texts. Later, Čelakovský learned of this enterprise, and not only furnished his own list, but became Bowring's close collaborator, sending him material with his own German paraphrases for Bowring to work on. Bowring, partly to make amends for the delayed publication of the Czech poetry anthology, wrote a piece in the Foreign Quarterly Review in 1828, which presented the debate about these manuscripts evenly for both sides. (Note: But it angered Kopitar that Hanka and Čelakovský (in Kopitar's estimation) were treated as on par with Dobrovský, the doyen on these matters.)

Wratislaw noted in his 1852 translation that he was well aware of the controversy when he published his translation, but determined that the skeptics had not made their case.

Alois Vojtěch Šembera wrote a book in 1879 which contended that the "Libušin soud" poem (the second manuscript) was a forgery and named Josef Linda as its creator.

The authenticity of both manuscripts was not rejected conclusively until the 1880s when several independently-written articles appeared that assaulted their veracity. One author who doubted the authenticity of the manuscripts, Tomáš Masaryk, used his journal Athenaeum to publish a body of literature to support that view. The linguist Jan Gebauer wrote an article debunking the manuscripts in the February 1886 issue of Athenaeum, and Masaryk in a later issue wrote that the poems could be proven as "reworked from Modern Czech to Old Czech", presenting metrical and grammatical evidence to support his claim.

In the interim, the manuscripts were generally regarded romantically as evidence of early Czech literary achievement, demonstrating that such epic and lyric poetry predated even the Nibelungenlied. They were also interpreted as evidence that early Czech society had embraced democratic principles. Pan-Slavic nationalists saw in the manuscripts a symbol of national conscience. Therefore, when Palacký wrote his Czech history based partly on these manuscripts, he depicted a romanticized Slavic struggle against the German non-democratic social order. Palacký's historical accounts of Bohemia based on the manuscripts also bolstered the Czechs' exclusive claims on Bohemia.

The debate over the authenticity and authorship of these manuscripts has occupied Czech politics for more than a century, and voices claiming the poems to be genuine were not silenced even into World War II.

Václav Hanka, the discoverer of the first manuscript, and his friend and roommate Josef Linda are generally regarded to have been the forgers of the poetry, but they never confessed to writing them, and there has not been any irrefutable proof that they were the authors.

== See also ==
- Chrudoš
- Ossian
- Vestiarium Scoticum

== Sources ==
=== Primary ===
- Hanka, Václav, ed. (1843), "Manuscript of the Queen's Court. A collection of old Bohemian lyrico-epic Songs, with other Ancient Bohemian Poems", Rukopis Kralodvorský: a jiné výtečnějšie národnie Spevopravné básné. Slovně i věrně vpróvodniem starém jazyku, o pripojeniem polského, Južno- Ruského, Illyrského, Kramkého, Horrolužického, Německého i Anglického Prěloženie, John Bowring, V Praze (Prague): Nákl. vydavetelovým, pp. 274–316
- Wratislaw, Albert Henry (tr.) (1852a), Manuscript of the Queen's Court: A Collection of Old Bohemian Lyrico-epic, Prague: Václav Hanka
- Wratislaw, Albert Henry (tr.) (1852b), The Queen's Court Manuscript, with Other Ancient Bohemian Poems, Cambridge: John Deighton, hdl:2027/nyp.33433058710595

=== Secondary ===
- Hartwig, Kurt (1999), "The Incidental History of Folklore in Bohemia", The Folklore Historian, vol. 16, Indiana State University/Hoosier Folklore Society, pp. 61–74
- Morfill, W. R. (1879), "The Bohemians and Slovaks", The Westminster Review, 56 (new ser.): 415–164
- Tomek, Václav Vladivoj (1859), Die Grünberger Handschrift. Zeugnisse über die Auffindung des "Libušin soud" (in German), Malý, Jakub Budislav (tr.)
