= Jirak =

Jirak may refer to:

- Jirák, a Czech surname
- Jirg, also known as Jirak, a village in Iran
- Jik-e Sofla, also known as Jīrak, a village in Iran
