= Pavel Jozef Šafařík =

Czech and Slovak linguist (1795–1861)

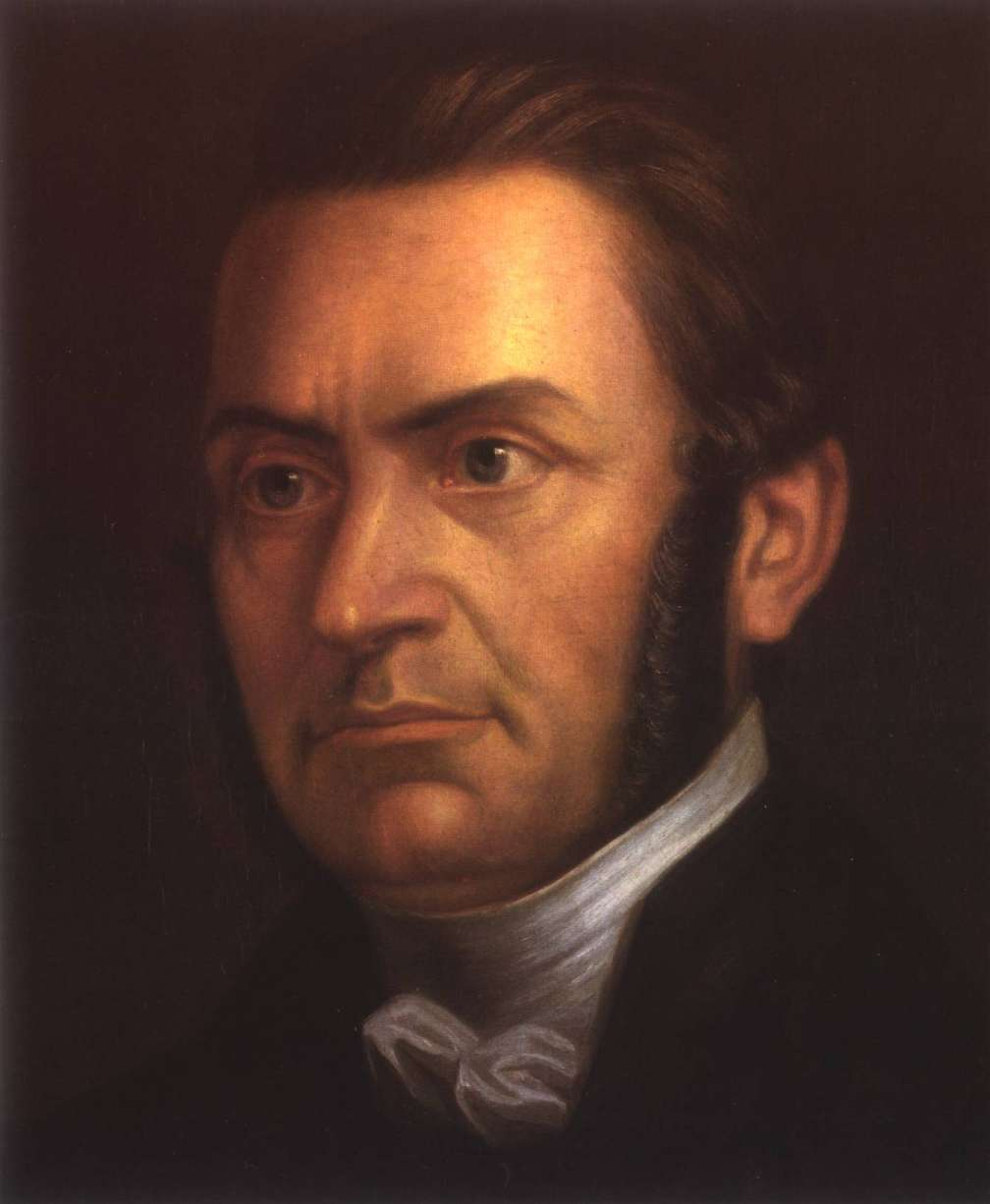
- Born: 13 May 1795; Kobeliarovo, Kingdom of Hungary, Habsburg monarchy
- Died: 26 June 1861 (aged 66); Prague, Bohemia, Austrian Empire
- Other names: Slovak: Pavol Jozef Šafárik; German: Paul Joseph Schaffarik; Serbian: Павле Јосиф Шафарик; Latin: Paulus Josephus Schaffarik; Hungarian: Pál József Safarik
- Citizenship: Kingdom of Hungary

Pavel Jozef Šafařík (Slovak: Pavol Jozef Šafárik; 13 May 1795 – 26 June 1861) was a Czech and Slovak philologist, poet, literary historian, historian and ethnographer. He was one of the first scientific Slavists.

== Family ==
Šafařík was born in Kobeliarovo, Kingdom of Hungary, Habsburg monarchy (now Slovakia) on 13 May 1795. His father Pavol Šafárik (1761–1831) was a Protestant clergyman in Kobeliarovo and before that a teacher in Štítnik, where he was also born. His mother, Katarína Káresová (1764–1812) was born in a poor lower gentry family in Hanková and had several jobs in order to help the family in the poor region of Kobeliarovo.

P.J. Šafařík had two elder brothers and one elder sister. One brother, Pavol Jozef as well, died before Šafařík was born. In 1813, after Katarína's death, Šafařík's father married the widow Rozália Drábová, although Šafařík and his brothers and sister were against this marriage. The local teacher provided Šafařík with Czech books.

On 17 June 1822, when he was in Novi Sad (see below), Šafařík married 19-year-old Júlia Ambrózy de Séden (Slovak: Júlia Ambróziová; 1803–1876), a highly intelligent member of Hungarian lower gentry born in 1803 in modern-day Serbia.

She spoke Slovak, Czech, Serbian and Russian, and supported Šafařík in his scientific work. In Novi Sad, they also had three daughters (Ľudmila, Milena, Božena) and two sons (Mladen Svatopluk, Vojtěch), but the first two daughters and the first son died shortly after their birth. Upon Šafařík's arrival in Prague, they had 6 more children, out of which one died shortly after its birth.

His eldest son Vojtěch (1831–1902) became a chemist, Jaroslav (1833–1862) became a military doctor and later the supreme assistant at the Joseph Academy in Vienna, Vladislav (born 1841) became a professional soldier, and Božena (born 1831) married Josef Jireček (1825–1888), a Czech literary historian, politician and a tutor in Šafařík's family. Vojtech wrote an interesting biography of his father – Co vyprávěl P. J. Šafařík (What Šafařík said) – and the son of Božena and Jireček the study Šafařík mezi Jihoslovany (Šafařík among the Southern Slavs).

== Life ==
=== Early years (1795–1815) ===
Pavel spent his childhood in the region of Kobeliarovo in northern Gemer characterized by attractive nature and rich Slovak culture. He gained his basic education from his father. As Šafařík's son Vojtech put it later in his book (see Family):

When, at the age of 7, his father showed him only one alphabet, he by himself hands down learned to read, and from then on he was always sitting on the stove and was reading. By the age of eight, he had read the whole Bible twice and one of his favorite activities was preaching to his brothers and sister, and to local people.

In 1805–1808, Šafařík studied at a "lower gymnasium" (in some sources described as Protestant school which was just changed into a middle Latin school) in Rožňava, where he learned Latin, German and Hungarian. Since he did not have enough money to finance his studies, he continued his studies in Dobšiná for two years, because he could live there with his sister.

At that time, it was absolutely necessary for anyone who wanted to become a successful scientist in the Kingdom of Hungary (which included today's Slovakia) to have a good command of Latin, German, and Hungarian. Since the school in Rožňava specialized in Hungarian and the school in Dobšiná in German, and Šafařík was an excellent student and both schools had a good reputation, all prerequisites for a successful career were fulfilled as early as at the age of 15.

In 1810–1814 he studied at the Evangelical lyceum of Kežmarok, where he got to know many Polish, Serbian and Ukrainian students and his most important friend Ján Blahoslav Benedikti, with whom they together read texts of Slovak and Czech national revivalists, especially those of Josef Jungmann. He was also familiarized with classical literature and German aesthetics (also thanks to the excellent library of the lyceum), and started to show interest in Serbian culture.

He graduated from the following branches of study: philosophy (including logic, metaphysics, mathematics, physics, economia ruralis, Latin style, comparative philosophy and history of the Kingdom of Hungary), politics and law (including jus naturae, jus privatum civile et criminale, scienciae politicae), and theology (including dogmatic and moral theology, hermeneutics, Greek, Hebrew, physics, medicine, natural law, state law and international law). The studies at this school were very important; since this was a largely German school, he was able to get a (partial) scholarship for a university in Germany.

He worked as a private tutor in the family of Dávid Goldberger in Kežmarok between 1812 and 1814, which he also did one year after the end of his studies in Kežmarok. His mother died in late 1812 and his father remarried 6 months later. His first larger work was a volume of poems entitled The Muse of Tatras with a Slavonic Lyre published in 1814 (see Works). The poems were written in the old-fashioned standard of the Moravian Protestant translation of the Bible that the Slovak Lutherans used in their publications with many elements from Slovak and some from Polish.

=== Germany (1815–1817) ===
In 1815, he began to study at the University of Jena, where he turned from a poet into a scientist. It was the wish of his father, who financed him, to study there.

He attended lectures in history, philology, philosophy and natural sciences (lectures held by the professors Fries, Oken, Luden, and Eichenstädt), studied books of Herder and Fichte, was observing current literature and studied classical literature. While there he translated into Czech the Clouds of Aristophanes (issued in the Časopis Českého musea [Journal of the Bohemian museum] in 1830) and the Maria Stuart of Schiller (issued in 1831).

In 1816, he became a member of the Latin Society of Jena. Seventeen of Šafařík's poems written at this time (1815–1816) appeared in the Prvotiny pěkných umění by Hromádka in Vienna and made Šafařík well known among the Slovaks and the Czech lands. In Jena, which Šafařík liked very much, he mainly learned to apply scientific methods and found a lot of new friends. One of them was the Slovak writer Ján Chalupka, and another one, Samuel Ferjenčík, introduced him to Johann Wolfgang Goethe. Although he was an excellent student, Šafařík had to leave the University of Jena in May 1817 for unknown reasons (probably lack of money).

In 1817, on his way back home, he visited Leipzig and Prague. In Prague, where he was searching for a tutor job, he spent one month and joined the literary circle, whose members were Josef Dobrovský, Josef Jungmann and Václav Hanka, whom Šafařík thus got to know in person.

=== Return to homeland (1817–1833) ===
Between the summer of 1817 and June 1819, he worked as a tutor in Pressburg (Bratislava) in the well-known family of Gašpar Kubínyi. He also became a good friend of the Czech František Palacký, with whom he had already exchanged letters before and who was also a tutor in Pressburg at that time. The town of Pressburg was a social and intellectual center of the Kingdom of Hungary at that time. In the spring of 1819, Šafařík befriended the Slovak writer and politician Ján Kollár.

Before he left for the southern territories of the Kingdom of Hungary (present-day Serbia), Šafařík spent some time in Kobeliarovo and with his grandfather in Hanková. This was the last time Šafařík saw his native country.

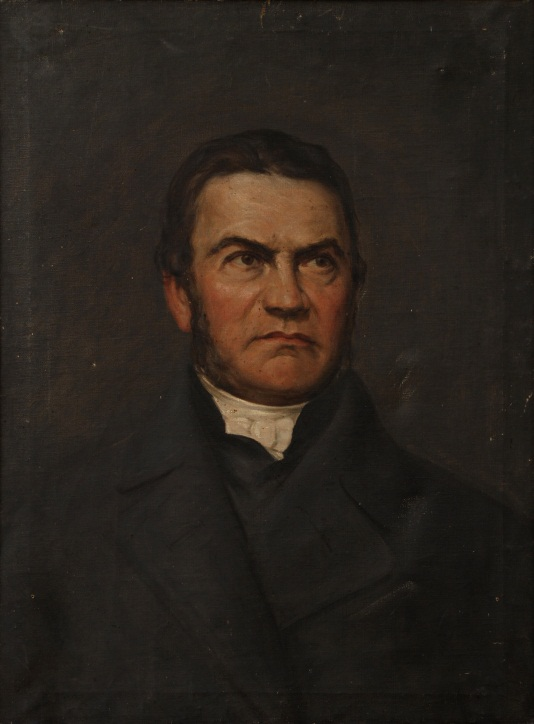
Portrait of Šafařík done by the vojvodinian Slovak painter Karol Miloslav Lehotský

In April 1819, his friend Ján Blahoslav Benedikti helped him to get a doctor's degree, which he needed in order to become headmaster of a new gymnasium in Novi Sad, in the south of the Kingdom of Hungary, where he befriended the teacher and writer Georgije Magarašević. From 1819 he was headmaster, and from 1825 a teacher, at the Serbian Orthodox gymnasium at Novi Sad, where he stayed until 1833. All other teachers at the gymnasium were Serbs, including novelist Milovan Vidaković, who taught there at the same time as Šafařík. He himself taught mathematics, physics, logic, rhetoric, poetry, stylistics and classic literature in Latin, German, and when Magyarization (Hungarisation) by the authorities intensified, also in Hungarian. From 1821 onwards, he also worked as a tutor of the son of the nephew of Metropolitan Stefan Stratimirović. In 1824 he had to renounce the post of headmaster because the Austrian government prohibited the Serbian Orthodox Church from employing Protestants from the Kingdom of Hungary. This caused Šafařík, who had to finance his newly arisen family, to lose a substantial source of income. He therefore tried to find a teaching position in his native country, but for various reasons he did not succeed. In Novi Sad he studied Serbian literature and antiquities, and he acquired many rare – especially Old Church Slavonic – books and manuscripts, which he used in Prague later. He also published a collection of Slovak folk songs and sayings in collaboration with Ján Kollár and others (see Works). In 1826 his Geschichte der slawischen Sprache und Literatur nach allen Mundarten was published. This book was the first attempt to give anything like a systematic account of the Slavonic languages as a whole.

=== Bohemia (1833–1861) ===
In 1832 he finally decided to leave Novi Sad and tried to find a teacher or librarian job in Russia, but again without success. In 1833, with the help of Ján Kollár and on invitation of influential friends in Prague who promised to finance him, he went to Prague, where he spent the remainder of his life. During his entire stay in Prague, especially in the 1840s, his very existence depended on the 380 florins he received annually from his Czech friends under the condition which explicitly expressed František Palacký: "From now on, anything you write, you will write it in Czech only." Šafařík was an editor of the journal Světozor (1834–1835). In 1837 poverty compelled him to accept the uncongenial office of censor of Czech publications, which he abandoned in 1847. Between 1838 and 1842 he was first editor, later conductor, of the journal Časopis Českého musea, since 1841 he was a custodian of the Prague University Library. In Prague, he published most of his works, especially his greatest work Slovanské starožitnosti ("Slavonic Antiquities") in 1837. He also edited the first volume of the Výbor (selections from old Czech writers), which appeared under the auspices of the Prague literary society in 1845. To this he prefixed a grammar of Old Czech (Počátkové staročeské mluvnice).

In the papers collection Hlasowé o potřebě jednoty spisowného jazyka pro Čechy, Morawany a Slowáky ("Voices on the necessity of a united standard language for the Bohemians, Moravians and Slovaks") published by Ján Kollár in 1846, Šafařík moderately criticized Ľudovít Štúr's introduction of a new Slovak standard language (1843) that replaced the previously used Lutheran standard which was closer to the Czech language (the Slovak Catholics used a different standard). Šafařík – as opposed to most of his Czech colleagues – always considered the Slovaks a separate nation from the Czechs (e.g. explicitly in his works Geschichte der slawischen Sprache... and in Slovanský národopis) but he advocated the use of Slovacized Czech ("Slovak style of the Czech language") as the only standard language among the Slovak people.

During the Revolution of 1848 he was mainly collecting material for books on the oldest Slavic history. In 1848 he was made head of the University Library of Prague and a masterful professor of Slavonic philology in the University of Prague, but resigned to the latter in 1849 and remained head of the university library only. The reason for this resignation was that during the Revolution of 1848–49 he participated at the Slavic Congress in Prague in June 1848 and thus became suspicious for Austrian authorities. During the absolutistic period following the defeat of the revolution (so-called Bach's absolutism), he lived a secluded life and studied especially older Czech literature and Old Church Slavonic texts and culture.

In 1856–1857, as a result of persecution anxieties, overwork, and ill health, he became physically and mentally ill and burned most of his correspondence with important personalities (e.g. with Ján Kollár). In May 1860, his depression made him jump into the Vltava river, but he was saved. This event produced considerable sensation among the general public. In early October 1860 he asked for retirement from his post as University Library head. The Austrian emperor himself enabled him this in a letter written by his majesty himself and granted him a pension, which corresponded to Šafařík's previous full pay.

Šafařík died on 26 June 1861 in Prague and was buried in the evangelical cemetery in Karlín Quarter.

== Works ==
=== Poetry ===
- Ode festiva... (Levoča, 1814), an ode to the baron and colonel Ondrej Máriassy, the patron of the Kežmarok lyceum, on the occasion of his return from the war against Napoleon
- Tatranská múza s lyrou slovanskou (Levoča, 1814) [The Muse of Tatras with a Slavonic Lyre – poems inspired by Classical, contemporaneous European literature (Friedrich Schiller) and by Slovak traditions and legends (Juraj Jánošík)

=== Scientific works ===
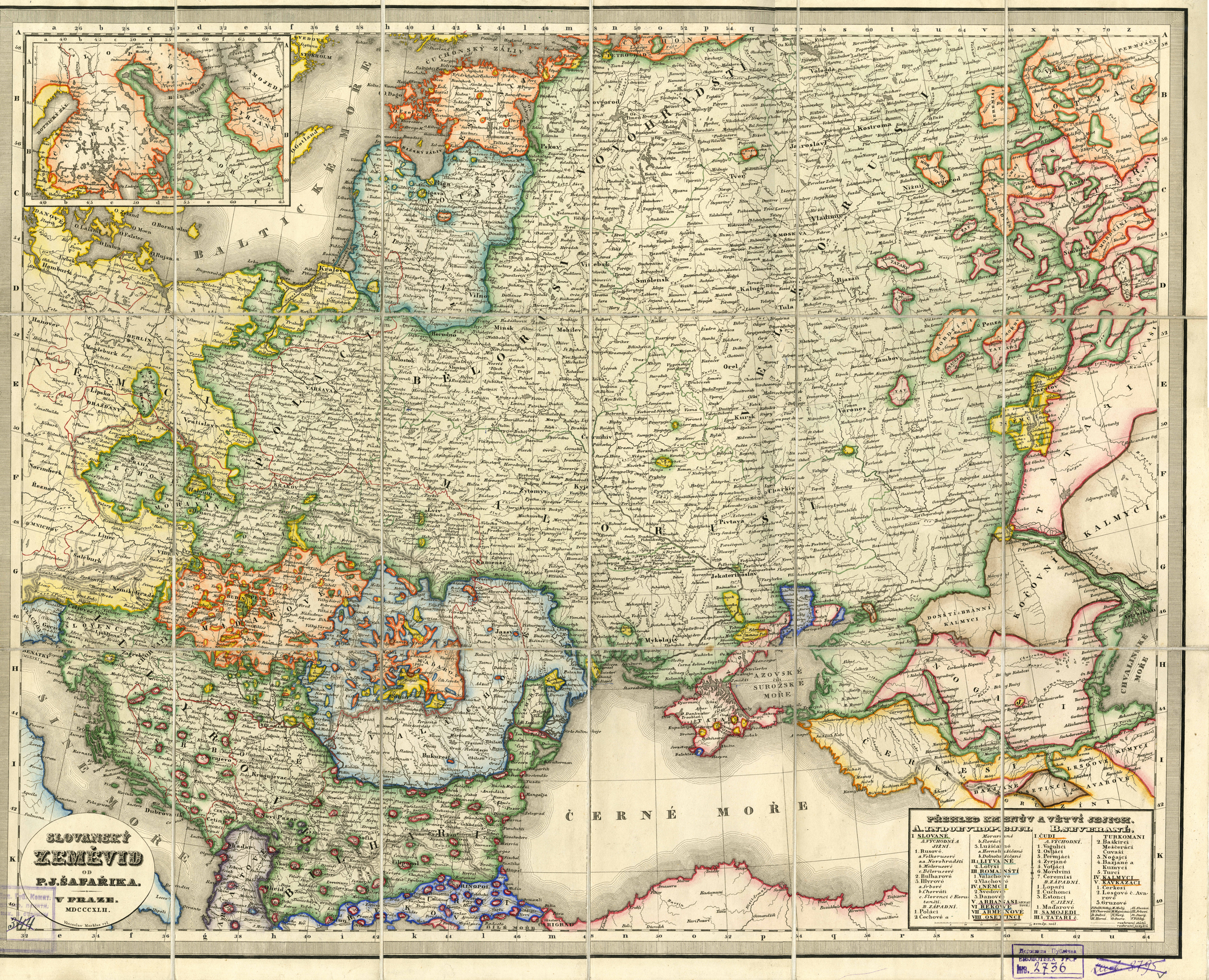
Ethnographic map "Slavic lands," made by Pavel Šafařík in 1842

- Promluvení k Slovanům [An address to the Slavs] in: Prvotiny pěkných umění (1817, ?) – inspired by Herder and other national literatures, he calls the Slovaks, Moravians and Bohemians to collect folk songs
- Počátkové českého básnictví, obzvláště prozodie (1818, Bratislava), together with František Palacký [literally:Basics of Czech poetry, in particular of the prosody] – deals with technical issues of poetry writing
- Novi Graeci non uniti ritus gymnasii neoplate auspicia feliciter capta. Adnexa est oratio Pauli Josephi Schaffarik (1819, Novi Sad)
- Písně světské lidu slovenského v Uhřích. Sebrané a vydané od P. J. Šafárika, Jána Blahoslava a jiných. 1–2 (Pest 1823–1827) /Národnie zpiewanky- Pisne swetské Slowáků v Uhrách (1834–1835, Buda), together with Ján Kollár [Profane songs of the Slovak people in the Kingdom of Hungary. Collected and issued by P. J. Šafařík, Ján Blahoslav and others. 1–2 / Folk songs – Profane songs of the Slovaks in the Kingdom of Hungary] –
- Geschichte der slawischen Sprache und Literatur nach allen Mundarten (1826, Pest), [History of the Slavic language and literature by all vernaculars] – a huge encyclopedia-style book, the first attempt to give anything like a systematic account of the Slavonic languages as a whole.
- Über die Abkunft der Slawen nach Lorenz Surowiecki (1828, Buda) [On the origin of the Slavs according to Lorenz Surowiecki] – aimed to be a reaction the Surowiecki's text, the text developed into a book on the homeland of the Slavs and challenges modern theory that Slavs were newcomers to Europe in 5th and 6th century AD.
- Serbische Lesekörner oder historisch-kritische Beleuchtung der serbischen Mundart (1833, Pest) [Serbian anthology or historical and critical elucidation of the Serbian vernacular] – explanation of the character and development of Serbian language
- Slovanské starožitnosti(1837 + 1865, Prague) [Slavonic Antiquities], his main work, the first larger book on the culture and history of the Slavs, a second edition (1863) was edited by Josef Jireček (see Family), a continuation was published only after Šafařík's death in Prague in 1865; Russian, German and Polish translations followed immediately; the main book describes the origin, settlements, localisation and historic events of the Slavs on the basis of an extensive collection of material; inspired by Herder's opinions, he refused to consider the Slavs as slaves and barbarians as was frequent at that time especially in German literature; he states that all Slavs have a common ethnicity under old name of Serbs/Sorabs and that before they were known as Veneti/Wends and Illiryans; the book substantially influenced the view of the Slavs, however not enough to change the theory of Slavic migrations to central Europe from Asia
- Monumenta Illyrica (1839, Prague) – monuments of old Southern Slavic literature, which clearly states his views that Slavs are Illyrians
- Die ältesten Denkmäler der böhmischen Sprache... (1840, Prague) [The oldest monuments of Czech language . . . ], together with František Palacký
- Slovanský národopis (1842, 2 editions, Prague) [Slavic ethnology], his second most important work, he sought to give a complete account of Slavonic ethnology; contains basic data on individual Slavic nations, settlements, languages, ethnic borders, and a map, on which the Slavs are formally considered one nation divided into Slavic national units. As he demonstrates: all Slavs were once called Serbs/Sorabs and prior to that Illyrians. Hence, once one nation divided into smaller tribes which later formed countries, two tribes kept their original name: Lusatian Serbs (today a minority in Germany) and Balkan Serbs who live on territories of modern-day Serbia, Montenegro, Bosnia and Herzegovina and parts of Croatia
- Počátkové staročeské mluvnice in: Výbor (1845) [Basics of Old Czech grammar]
- Juridisch-politische Terminologie der slawischen Sprachen Oesterreichs (Vienna, 1850) [Legal and political terminology of the Slavic languages in Austria], a dictionary written together with Karel Jaromír Erben, Šafařík and Erben became – by order of Alexander Bach members of a committee for Slavic legal terminology in Austria
- Památky dřevního pisemnictví Jihoslovanův (1851, Prague) [Monuments of old literature of the Southern Slavs] – contains Church Slavonic texts
- Památky hlaholského pisemnictví (1853, Prague) [Monuments of the Glagolitic literature]
- Glagolitische Fragmente (1857, Prague), together with Höfler [Glagolitic fragments]
- Über den Ursprung und die Heimat des Glagolitismus (1858, Prague) [On the origin and the homeland of the Glagolitic script] – here he accepted the view that the Glagolitic alphabet is older than the Cyrillic one
- Geschichte der südslawischen Literatur 1–3 (1864–1865, Prague) [History of Southern Slavic literature], edited by Jireček

=== Collected works & papers ===
- Sebrané spisy P. J. Šafaříka 1–3 (Prague, 1862–1863, 1865)
- Spisy Pavla Josefa Šafaříka 1 (Bratislava, 1938)

== Recognition ==
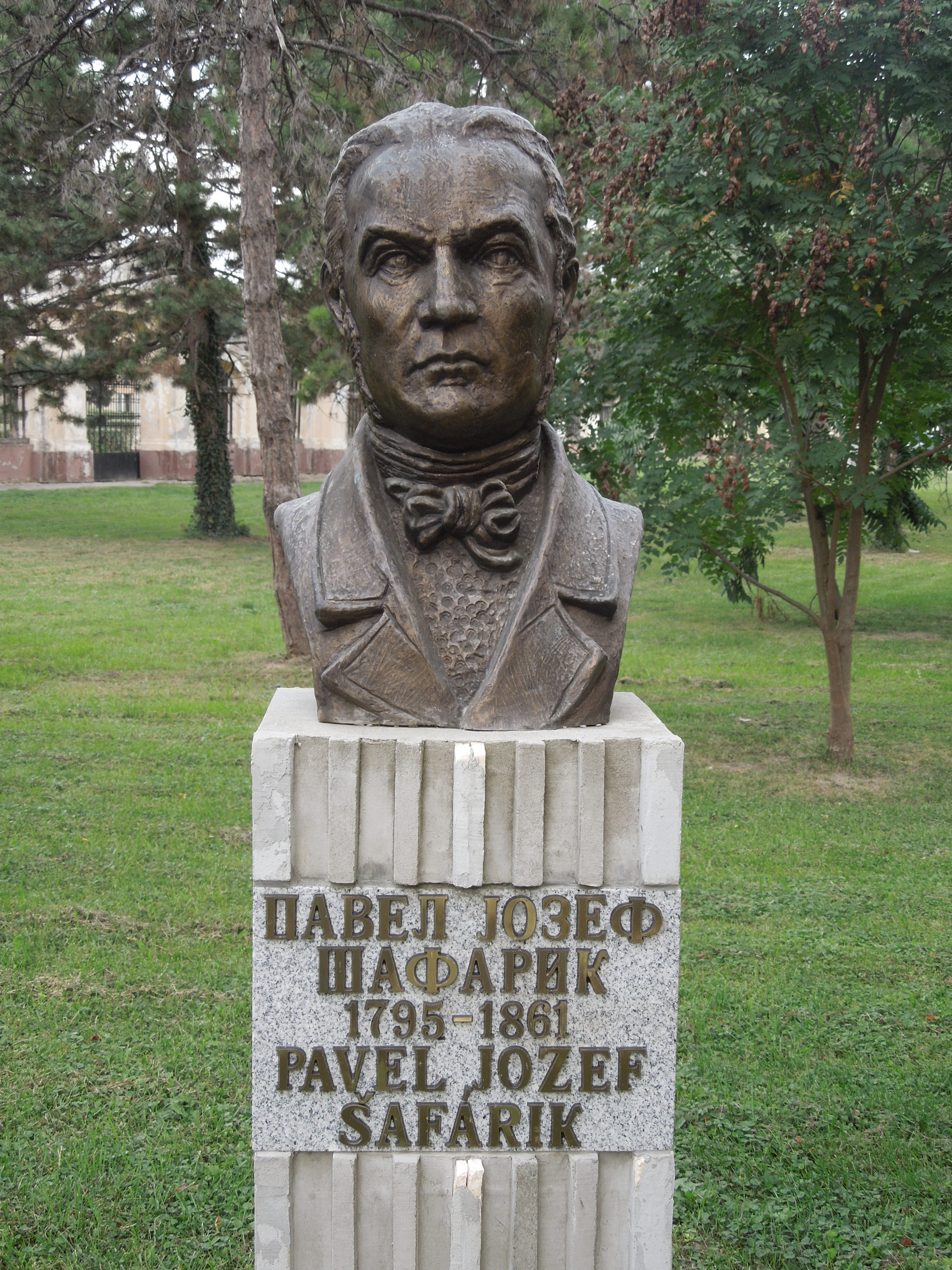
A bust of Šafařík in Kulpin, Serbia

- Pavol Jozef Šafárik University in Košice is named after him.
- Gymnázium Pavla Jozefa Šafárika in Rožňava is named after him.
- A street in Novi Sad and a street in Belgrade are named after him.
- Slovak cultural center Pavel Jozef Šafárik in Novi Sad.
- A street in Prague is named after him
- Streets in Stara Pazova are named after him
- Tornaľa is a town in southern Slovakia with a Hungarian majority. It was renamed "Šafárikovo" between 1948 and 1992.

== Sources ==
- Hanus, Josef (1895). Pavel Josef Šafařík v životě i spisích: ke stoletým narozeninám jeho (in Czech). Prague: Tiskem a nákladem knihtiskárny Dra. Edv. Grégra.
- "Miscellanea iz Šafaŕikove ostavštine u Pragu" [Miscellanea from Šafaŕik's Estate in Prague]. Građa za povijest književnosti hrvatske (in Serbo-Croatian). 7: 361–364. 1912.
