= Royal cities =

The term royal city denotes a privilege that some cities in the Lands of the Bohemian Crown enjoyed during the Middle Ages. It meant the city was an inalienable part of the royal estate; the king could not sell or pledge the city. At the beginning of the 16th century, about 40 cities enjoyed this privilege. The citizens of these cities had a higher position in the estates of the realm than any other subjects.

A similar status was dowry town; these were a source of income for the Queen. These cities had a duty of socage. Originally, this meant that each citizen had to work the kings land a certain number of days each year, but this was soon replaced by a cash payment.

== Citizens of the royal cities ==
Citizens of the royal cities had a special social status. It took a legal deed to become citizen. If the applicant purchased a home, or lived in the city for a long time, or could prove "good" ancestry and a decent family life and, if he had been a subject, could show a release certificate, then the applicant had a chance to be admitted to this privileged class. There were other ways to obtain this status: one could purchase it, or marry into it. Sometimes a city would offer citizenship, especially to educated inhabitants.

The precise rights and duties of the citizens differed considerably from city to city. They depended on the status of the city. Even among the citizens, there was a hierarchy, which was reflected in income, the order at the Last Supper and the seat in the church, but also at the location of the house.

== Royal cities in Bohemia and Moravia ==
Czech name, German name, and year of appointment:

- Uničov (Mährisch Neustadt) 1213
- Bruntál (Freudenthal) 1223
- Opava (Troppau) vor 1224
- Hradec Králové (Königgrätz) 1225
- Znojmo (Znaim) 1226
- Jemnice (Jamnitz) etwa 1227
- Hodonín (Göding) etwa 1228
- Litoměřice (Leitmeritz) 1228–1230
- Bzenec (Bisenz) 1231
- Staré Město (Prager Altstadt) 1235–1245
- Brno (Brünn) 1238, 1240
- Stříbro (Mies) 1240
- Loket (Elbogen) 1240–1253
- Žatec (Saaz) 1265
- Přerov (Prerau) 1252
- Olomouc (Ölmütz) 1253
- Jihlava (Iglau) 1253
- Písek (Pisek) 1256
- Kolín (Kolin, also known as Cologne on the Elbe) 1253–1261
- Kouřim (Gurim, older: Kaurzim) 1253–1261
- Tachov (Tachau) 1253–1278
- Most (Brüx) before 1257
- Uherské Hradiště (Ungarisch Hradisch) 1257
- Čáslav (Tschaslau) c. 1260
- Chrudim (–) c. 1260
- Klatovy (Klattau) before 1260
- Vysoké Mýto (Hohenmauth) c. 1260
- Ústí nad Labem (Aussig) c. 1260
- Louny (Laun) after 1260
- Kadaň (Kaaden) before 1261
- Domažlice (Taus) c. 1262
- České Budějovice (Böhmisch Budweis) 1265
- Polička (Politschka) 1265
- Chotěboř (Chotieborsch) 1265–1278
- Ostrov nad Ohří (Schlackenwerth) 1269
- Litovel (Littau) 1270
- Uherský Brod (Ungarisch Brod) 1272
- Sušice (Schüttenhofen) 1273?
- Nymburk (Nimburg, also known as Neuenburg on the Elbe) 1275
- Dvůr Králové (Königinhof on the Elbe) 1253–1278 and after 1399
- Jaroměř (Jermer) 1253–1278
- Mělník (Melnik) 1253–1274
- Kutná Hora (Kuttenberg) vor 1276
- Plzeň (Pilsen) 1295
- Nový Bydžov (Neubidschow) 1305–1325
- Vodňany (Wodnian) 1337
- Pražské Nové Město (Prager Neustadt) 1348
- Karlovy Vary (Karlsbad) 1370
- Trutnov (Trautenau) 1399
- Nový Knín (Neuknin) 1437
- Velvary (Welwarn) 1482
- Kyjov (Gaya) 1548
- Beroun (Beraun)
- Slaný (Schlan)
- Hlivice (Gleiwitz)
- Ivančice (Eibenschütz)
- Kozlí (Cosel)
- Opolí (Oppeln)
- Pohořelice (Pohrlitz)
- Prudník (Neustadt)
- Ratiboř (Ratibor)
- Žárov (Sohrau)
