= Jiráček =

Jiráček (Czech pronunciation: [ˈjɪraːtʃɛk]); feminine: Jiráčková) is a Czech surname, a diminutive of Jirák. A similar Czech surname is Jireček. Notable people with the surname include:

- Marta Jiráčková (born 1932), Czech composer
- Petr Jiráček (born 1986), Czech footballer
- Václav Jiráček (born 1978), Czech actor

== See also ==
- Jiracek (disambiguation)
