= Jireček =

Jireček (feminine: Jirečková) is a Czech surname. A similar surname is Jiráček. Notable people with the surname include:

- Hermenegild Jireček (1827–1909), Czech historian and lawyer
- Josef Jireček (1825–1888), Czech scholar
- Konstantin Jireček (1854–1918), Czech historian and politician

== See also ==
- Jireček Line, a conceptual line between ancient Greek and Latin spheres of influence in the Balkans
- Jireček Point, a point on the northwest coast of Smith Island in the South Shetland Islands
- Irechek, a village in Bulgaria
