= Jik =

Jik or JIK may refer to:

- Jik-e Sofla or Jīk, a village in South Khorasan Province, Iran
- Ikaria Island National Airport, an airport in Greece serving the island of Icaria with the IATA code “JIK.”
- A Reckitt Benckiser bleach brand
- Kanye West's 9th studio album, Jesus is King
