= List of compositions by Alois Hába =

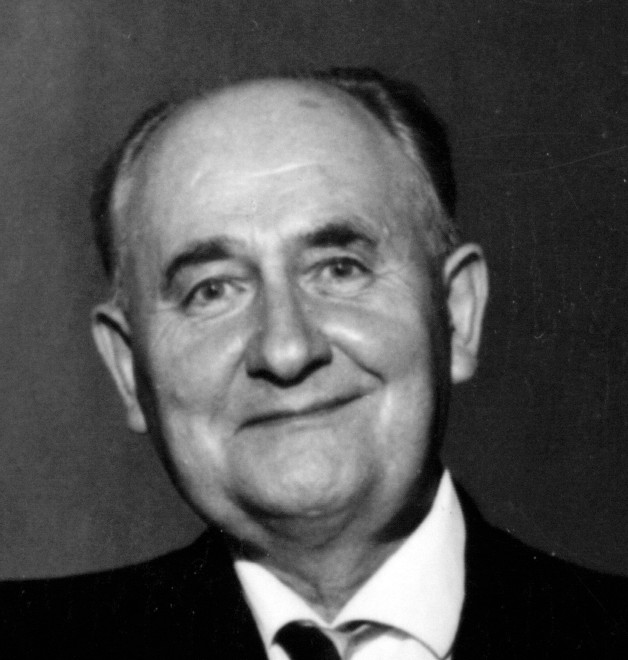
Hába in 1957

The works of the Czech composer Alois Hába consists of 103 opuses, with the majority of the compositions being various kinds of chamber music pieces, predominantly for piano or strings. The most important works include his String quartets, which document and demonstrate the development of the composer's style (microtonal music and his most innovative opera: "Matka" (Mother). Hába's first microtonal composition is Suite, op.1a from 1918, his earliest published mictrotonal piece is the 2nd Quartet (1920) and his last was the 16th Quartet from 1967.

Note that 'semitone' refers to the usual 12-tET scale, 'quarter-tone' refers to 24-tET, '5th-tone' refers to 31-tET (not 30-tET), '6th-tone' refers to 36-tET, '12-tone' refers to Schoenberg's '12-tone method'.

== Piano works ==
- Op. 1a, Suite (3 fugues) for piano (1918)
- Op. 1b, Variations for piano on a canon of Robert Schumann (1914–15, * 1918)
- Op. 2, 2 Sketches for piano
- Op. 3, Sonata for piano
- Op. 6, 6 piano pieces (1920)
- Op. 10, 1st Suite for quarter-tone piano (revised 1932 as op. 11a), 1922
- Op. 11, 2nd Suite for quarter-tone piano (revised 1932 as op. 11b), 1922
- Op. 16, 3rd Suite for quarter-tone piano (1923)
- Op. 17, 1st Fantasy for quarter-tone piano (1923)
- Op. 19, 2nd Fantasy for quarter-tone piano (1924)
- Op. 20, 3rd Fantasy for quarter-tone piano (1924)
- Op. 22, 4th Suite for quarter-tone piano (1925)
- Op. 23, 5th Suite for quarter-tone piano (1925)
- Op. 25, 4th Fantasy for quarter-tone piano (1925)
- Op. 26, 5th Fantasy for quarter-tone piano (1925)
- Op. 27, 6th Fantasy for quarter-tone piano (1926)
- Op. 28, 7th Fantasy for quarter-tone piano (1926)
- Op. 29, 8th Fantasy for quarter-tone piano (1926)
- Op. 30, 9th Fantasy for quarter-tone piano (1926)
- Op. 31, 10th Fantasy for quarter-tone piano (1926)
- Op. 38, Toccata quasi una Fantasia (semitone piano), 1931
- Op. 39, 4 Modern Dances for piano (1927-1931)
- Op. 62, Sonata for quarter-tone piano (1946–47)
- Op. 88, Suite Nr. 6 (quarter-tone piano), 1957–59
- Op. 90, 12th String Quartet (quarter-tone), 1959–60
- Op.102, 6 Moods for piano (1971)

== Vocal works ==
- Op. 13, Vocal-suite in quarter-tones (choir), 1922
- Op. 35, Matka (Mother), quarter-tone opera in 10 scenes (1927–28)
- Op. 36, Já (Me) - quarter-tone men's choir
- Op. 42, 5 Choruses (3 quarter-tone boy's or women's voices), 1932
- Op. 43, Children's Play (quarter-tone children's voices, soli and choir), 1932
- Op. 44, 5 Mixed Choruses (quarter-tone choir)
- Op. 45, Pracující den (The working day), 10 quarter-tone men's choruses (1932)
- Op. 46, Cesta života (The Path of Life), symphonic fantasy for orchestra & Mass Songs for choir (1933)
- Op. 47, Nová země (The New Earth), 12-tone opera in 3 acts & 6 scenes (1934–36)
- Op. 48, Children's rhymes (medium voice & piano), 1936
- Op. 50, Přijď království Tvé (Thy Kingdom Come), 6th-tone musical drama in 7 scenes, 1937–42
- Op. 51, Dětské nálady (Children's Moods), 8-song cycle (middle voice & quarter-tone guitar), 1943
- Op. 53, Poesie života (Poetry of Life), 12-song cycle (soprano & quarter-tone guitar), 1943
- Op. 57, Milenci (The Lovers), 7-song cycle (soprano & piano), 1944
- Op. 58, 5 Moravian Love-songs (mezzo-soprano, guitar or piano accompaniment), 1944
- Op. 64, Ústava 9. května (Constitution of May 9) for men's choir (1948)
- Op. 65, 3 Men's Choruses (1948)
- Op. 66, Meditace (Meditation) for men's choir (1948)
- Op. 67, Mír (Peace) for men's choir (1948)
- Op.67a, Soviet Songs (choir), 1948 & Mass Songs (choir), 1948-50
- Op. 68, Za mír (For Peace), cantata (choir & orchestra), 1949
- Op. 71, 3 Men's Choruses (1950)
- Op. 84, Slovanské mudrosloví (Slavic Proverbs) for boy's or women's choir & piano (1945–55)
- Op.99a, Praha (Prague) for choir, 1968
- Op.101, Poznámky z deníku (Diary-notes), melodrama for speaker & string-quartet (1970)

== Chamber works ==
- Op. 1, Sonata for violin and piano (1914–15)
- Op. 4, String Quartet 1 (semitone), 1919
- Op. 7, String Quartet 2 (quarter-tone), 1920
- Op. 9a, Fantasy in quarter-tones for violin solo (1921)
- Op. 9b, Music in quarter-tones for violin solo (1922)
- Op. 12, 3rd String Quartet (quarter-tone), 1922
- Op. 14, 4th String Quartet (quarter-tone), 1922
- Op. 15, 5th String Quartet (Hába's 1st 6th-tone composition), 1923
- Op. 18, Fantasy in quarter-tones for cello solo (1924)
- Op. 21, Fantasy for violin & quarter-tone piano (1925)
- Op. 24, 1st Suite for quarter-tone clarinet & quarter-tone piano (1925)
- Op. 32, Fantasy for viola & quarter-tone piano (1926)
- Op. 33, Fantasy for cello & quarter-tone piano (1927)
- Op.34a, Fantasy for flute (or violin) & piano (1927–28)
- Op.34b, Suite (arr. J. Horák) (bass-clarinet & piano) 1927-28
- Op. 40, Fantasy for Nonet Nr. 1 (12-tone), 1931
- Op. 41, Fantasy for Nonet Nr. 2 (7-tone), 1932
- Op. 49, Duo for 6th-tone violins (1937)
- Op. 52, Sonata for guitar (1943)
- Op. 54, 1st Suite for quarter-tone guitar (1943)
- Op. 55, 2nd Suite for quarter-tone clarinet (solo), 1943
- Op. 56, Suite for quarter-tone trumpet & trombone (1944)
- Op. 59, Sonata for Chromatic Harp (1944)
- Op. 60, Sonata for Diatonic Harp (1944)
- Op. 61, Intermezzo and Praeludium for diatonic harp (1944–45)
- Op. 63, 2nd Suite for quarter-tone guitar (1947)* Op. 69, Suite for bassoon solo (1950)
- Op. 70, 6th String Quartet (quarter-tone), 1950
- Op. 72, Suite in quarter-tones for 4 trombones (1950)
- Op. 73, 7th String Quartet "Christmas" (semitone), 1950–51
- Op. 74, Quartet for 4 bassoons (1951)
- Op.75c, 6 Polish Folksongs for harp (1951)
- Op. 76, 8th String Quartet (semitone), 1951
- Op. 78, Sonata for clarinet (solo), 1951
- Op. 79, 9th String Quartet (semitone), 1951
- Op. 80, 10th String Quartet (6th-tone), 1951
- Op.81a, Suite for violin solo (1955)
- Op.81b, Suite for cello solo (1955)
- Op. 82, 3rd Nonet (1953–55)
- Op.85a, Suite in 6th-tones for violin solo (1955)
- Op.85b, Suite in 6th-tones for cello solo (1955)
- Op. 87, 11th String Quartet (6th-tone), 1957–58
- Op. 90, 12th String Quartet (quarter-tone), 1959–60
- Op. 91, Suite for dulcimer (1960)
- Op. 92, 13th String Quartet (semitone), 1961
- Op. 93, Suite in quarter-tones for violin (1961–62)
- Op. 94, 14th String Quartet (quarter-tone), 1963
- Op. 95, 15th String Quartet (semitone), 1964
- Op. 96, Suite for bass-clarinet (1965)
- Op. 97, 4th Nonet (1967-1971)
- Op. 98, 16th String Quartet (5th-tone), 1967
- Op. 99, Suite for saxophone solo (1968)
- Op.100, Suite for bass-clarinet with piano (1969)
- Op.103, Suite for violin & piano (1972)

== By opus number ==
- Op. 1, Sonata for violin and piano (1914–15)
- Op. 1a, Suite (3 fugues) for piano (1918)
- Op. 1b, Variations for piano on a canon of Robert Schumann (1914–15, * 1918)
- Op. 2, 2 Sketches for piano
- Op. 3, Sonata for piano
- Op. 4, String Quartet 1 (semitone), 1919
- Op. 5, Overture for orchestra
- Op. 6, 6 piano pieces (1920)
- Op. 7, String Quartet 2 (quarter-tone), 1920
- Op. 8, Symphonic Fantasy for piano & orchestra (1920-1921)
- Op. 9a, Fantasy in quarter-tones for violin solo (1921)
- Op. 9b, Music in quarter-tones for violin solo (1922)
- Op. 10, 1st Suite for quarter-tone piano (revised 1932 as op. 11a), 1922
- Op. 11, 2nd Suite for quarter-tone piano (revised 1932 as op. 11b), 1922
- Op. 12, 3rd String Quartet (quarter-tone), 1922
- Op. 13, Vocal-suite in quarter-tones (choir), 1922
- Op. 14, 4th String Quartet (quarter-tone), 1922
- Op. 15, 5th String Quartet (Hába's 1st 6th-tone composition), 1923
- Op. 16, 3rd Suite for quarter-tone piano (1923)
- Op. 17, 1st Fantasy for quarter-tone piano (1923)
- Op. 18, Fantasy in quarter-tones for cello solo (1924)
- Op. 19, 2nd Fantasy for quarter-tone piano (1924)
- Op. 20, 3rd Fantasy for quarter-tone piano (1924)
- Op. 21, Fantasy for violin & quarter-tone piano (1925)
- Op. 22, 4th Suite for quarter-tone piano (1925)
- Op. 23, 5th Suite for quarter-tone piano (1925)
- Op. 24, 1st Suite for quarter-tone clarinet & quarter-tone piano (1925)
- Op. 25, 4th Fantasy for quarter-tone piano (1925)
- Op. 26, 5th Fantasy for quarter-tone piano (1925)
- Op. 27, 6th Fantasy for quarter-tone piano (1926)
- Op. 28, 7th Fantasy for quarter-tone piano (1926)
- Op. 29, 8th Fantasy for quarter-tone piano (1926)
- Op. 30, 9th Fantasy for quarter-tone piano (1926)
- Op. 31, 10th Fantasy for quarter-tone piano (1926)
- Op. 32, Fantasy for viola & quarter-tone piano (1926)
- Op. 33, Fantasy for cello & quarter-tone piano (1927)
- Op.34a, Fantasy for flute (or violin) & piano (1927–28)
- Op.34b, Suite (arr. J. Horák) (bass-clarinet & piano) 1927-28
- Op. 35, Matka (Mother), quarter-tone opera in 10 scenes (1927–28)
- Op. 36, Já (Me) - quarter-tone men's choir (1928)
- Op. 37, 6 Pieces for 6th-tone harmonium or string quartet (1928)
- Op. 38, Toccata quasi una Fantasia (semitone piano), 1931
- Op. 39, 4 Modern Dances for piano (1927-1931)
- Op. 40, Fantasy for Nonet Nr. 1 (12-tone), 1931
- Op. 41, Fantasy for Nonet Nr. 2 (7-tone), 1932
- Op. 42, 5 Choruses (3 quarter-tone boy's or women's voices), 1932
- Op. 43, Children's Play (quarter-tone children's voices, soli and choir), 1932
- Op. 44, 5 Mixed Choruses (quarter-tone choir)
- Op. 45, Pracující den (The working day), 10 quarter-tone men's choruses (1932)
- Op. 46, Cesta života (The Path of Life), symphonic fantasy for orchestra & Mass Songs for choir (1933)
- Op. 47, Nová země (The New Earth), 12-tone opera in 3 acts & 6 scenes (1934–36)
- Op. 48, Children's rhymes (medium voice & piano), 1936
- Op. 49, Duo for 6th-tone violins (1937)
- Op. 50, Přijď království Tvé (Thy Kingdom Come), 6th-tone musical drama in 7 scenes, 1937–42
- Op. 51, Dětské nálady (Children's Moods), 8-song cycle (middle voice & quarter-tone guitar), 1943
- Op. 52, Sonata for guitar (1943)
- Op. 53, Poesie života (Poetry of Life), 12-song cycle (soprano & quarter-tone guitar), 1943
- Op. 54, 1st Suite for quarter-tone guitar (1943)
- Op. 55, 2nd Suite for quarter-tone clarinet (solo), 1943
- Op. 56, Suite for quarter-tone trumpet & trombone (1944)
- Op. 57, Milenci (The Lovers), 7-song cycle (soprano & piano), 1944
- Op. 58, 5 Moravian Love-songs (mezzo-soprano, guitar or piano accompaniment), 1944
- Op. 59, Sonata for Chromatic Harp (1944)
- Op. 60, Sonata for Diatonic Harp (1944)
- Op. 61, Intermezzo and Praeludium for diatonic harp (1944–45)
- Op. 62, Sonata for quarter-tone piano (1946–47)
- Op. 63, 2nd Suite for quarter-tone guitar (1947)
- Op. 64, Ústava 9. května (Constitution of May 9) for men's choir (1948)
- Op. 65, 3 Men's Choruses (1948)
- Op. 66, Meditace (Meditation) for men's choir (1948)
- Op. 67, Mír (Peace) for men's choir (1948)
- Op.67a, Soviet Songs (choir), 1948 & Mass Songs (choir), 1948-50
- Op. 68, Za mír (For Peace), cantata (choir & orchestra), 1949
- Op. 69, Suite for bassoon solo (1950)
- Op. 70, 6th String Quartet (quarter-tone), 1950
- Op. 71, 3 Men's Choruses (1950)
- Op. 72, Suite in quarter-tones for 4 trombones (1950)
- Op. 73, 7th String Quartet "Christmas" (semitone), 1950–51
- Op. 74, Quartet for 4 bassoons (1951)
- Op.75a, Fantasy for organ (1951)
- Op.75b, Fantasy and Fugue "HABA" for organ (1951)
- Op.75c, 6 Polish Folksongs for harp (1951)
- Op. 76, 8th String Quartet (semitone), 1951
- Op. 77, Valašská suita (Wallachian Suite) for orchestra, 1951–53
- Op. 78, Sonata for clarinet (solo), 1951
- Op. 79, 9th String Quartet (semitone), 1951
- Op. 80, 10th String Quartet (6th-tone), 1951
- Op.81a, Suite for violin solo (1955)
- Op.81b, Suite for cello solo (1955)
- Op. 82, 3rd Nonet (1953–55)
- Op. 83, Violin Concerto (1954–55)
- Op. 84, Slovanské mudrosloví (Slavic Proverbs) for boy's or women's choir & piano (1945–55)
- Op.85a, Suite in 6th-tones for violin solo (1955)
- Op.85b, Suite in 6th-tones for cello solo (1955)
- Op. 86, Viola Concerto (1955–57)
- Op. 87, 11th String Quartet (6th-tone), 1957–58
- Op. 88, Suite Nr. 6 (quarter-tone piano), 1957–59
- Op. 89, Fantasy Nr. 11 (quarter-tone piano), 1959
- Op. 90, 12th String Quartet (quarter-tone), 1959–60
- Op. 91, Suite for dulcimer (1960)
- Op. 92, 13th String Quartet (semitone), 1961
- Op. 93, Suite in quarter-tones for violin (1961–62)
- Op. 94, 14th String Quartet (quarter-tone), 1963
- Op. 95, 15th String Quartet (semitone), 1964
- Op. 96, Suite for bass-clarinet (1965)
- Op. 97, 4th Nonet (1967-1971)
- Op. 98, 16th String Quartet (5th-tone), 1967
- Op. 99, Suite for saxophone solo (1968)
- Op.99a, Praha (Prague) for choir, 1968
- Op.100, Suite for bass-clarinet with piano (1969)
- Op.101, Poznámky z deníku (Diary-notes), melodrama for speaker & string-quartet (1970)
- Op.102, 6 Moods for piano (1971)
- Op.103, Suite for violin & piano (1972)

== Representative recordings ==
- Complete String Quartets (4 CD, Neos Music, Germany 2015), performed by the German ensemble Haba Quartett.
- Complete String Quartets (Streichquartette - Gesamtaufnahme; 4 CD, Bayer Records, Germany, 2006), performed by Czech ensemble Stamic Quartet
- Four Fugues for Organ as the part of the album Alois Hába / Miloslav Kabeláč / Jan Hora / Petr Čech – Complete Organ Works (Vixen, Czech Republic, 2001, CD)
- Complete Nonets by Czech Nonet, (Supraphon, Czech Republic, 1995)
- Czech Music Of The 20th Century: Alois Hába - Chamber Music by Suk Quartet and Czech Nonet (Praga, France, 1993)
- Mother by Prague National Theatre Orchestra, chorus and soloists (Supraphon, Czechoslovakia, 1966, 1980 & 1982 - 2LP; CD)

== See also ==
- 20th-century classical music
