= Kristýna =

- Kristýna Badinková Nováková (born 1983), Czech actress
- Kristýna Bláhová (born 2000), Czech ice hockey player
- Kristýna Fleissnerová (born 1992), Czech rower
- Kristýna Horská (born 1997), Czech swimmer
- Kristýna Kaltounková (born 2002), Czech ice hockey player
- Kristýna Kolocová (born 1988), Czech beach volleyball player
- Kristýna Kyněrová (born 1979), Czech swimmer
- Kristýna Leichtová (born 1985), Czech actress
- Kristyna Myles (born 1984), English musical artist
- Kristýna Napoleaová (born 1996), Czech professional golfer
- Kristýna Nepivodová (born 1989), Czech tennis player
- Kristýna Pálešová (born 1991), Czech artistic gymnast
- Kristýna Pastulová (born 1985), Czech volleyball player
- Kristýna Pátková (born 1998), Czech ice hockey player
- Kristýna Plíšková (born 1992), Czech tennis player
- Kristýna Salčáková (born 1987), Czech handball player
- Kristýna Znamenáčková (born 1988), Czech musical artist
