= Jiracek =

Jiracek may refer to:

- Jiráček, a Czech surname
- Mount Jiracek, Antarctica

== See also ==
- Jireček, a Czech surname
