= Kristýna Znamenáčková =

- Birth name: Sedláková
- Born: 11 September 1988 (age 36); Boskovice; Czechoslovakia
- Occupation(s): pianist, music teacher
- Instrument: piano
- Website: www.znamenackova.cz

Kristýna Znamenáčková (born 11 September 1988) is a Czech classical pianist.

She studied at the Conservatoire of Brno in the class of Eva Horáková and Dagmar Pančochová, and was awarded a prize for performing Prokofiev's Piano Concerto in D-flat major at the 2012 graduation concert. She pursued her studies at Prague Performing Arts Academy, in František Malý's class, in years 2012–2015. In 2017, she completed her studies in Alena Vlasáková and Jan Jiraský's class at Janáček Academy of Music and Arts in Brno and currently continues a doctoral programme specialised in Bohuslav Martinů at the academy.

In 2015, she won the International Bohuslav Martinů contest, praised by the jury for her interpretation of Martinů's Piano Sonata H.350 the recording of which was also released on a CD published by Bohuslav Martinů Institute in Prague. In 2017, she held a Martinů concert in Prague Rudolfinum concert hall, hosted by the Czech Philharmonic, and in December 2017, she performed there with the Stamic Quartet Martinů's Piano Quintet No. 1 H.229.

Kristýna Znamenáčková lives in the South Moravian town of Boskovice. She worked as a piano teacher at the Music School of Blansko and as an accompanying pianist at the Conservatoire of Brno. She performs solo and chamber music, with an emphasis on 20th century piano music, cooperating with renown soloists and the National Theatre in Brno and including benefit concerts. She also sings in, and occasionally co-conducts, the Vernum 2013 Ensemble choir.

In addition to her musical education, she graduated in Spanish language and literature at Brno University. She's active in organising cultural events in the Boskovice region, working with children, puzzlehunting events, amateur theatre, and photography. In 2018, she was elected town councillor in Boskovice for the Pirates.

== Awards ==
- 2009: Brno Piano Contest, 2nd prize and Prize for the interpretation of a Leoš Janáček's work
- 2012: Janáček Academy, Prize for the graduation concert
- 2015: Bohuslav Martinů Foundation international contest, 1st prize and Jury's prize for the best interpretation of a Bohuslav Martinů's work
