= Vraclav =

- Municipality
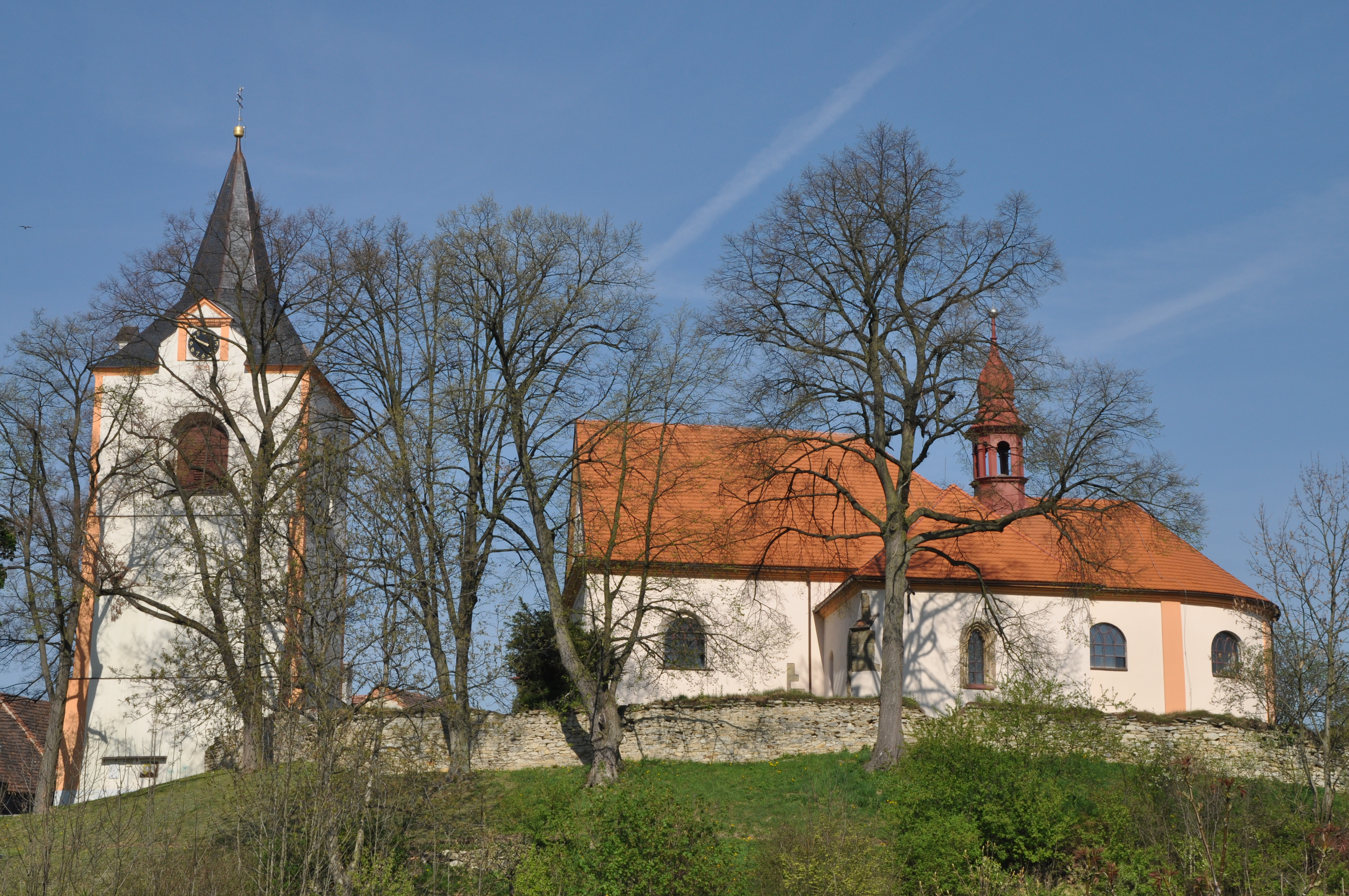
- Church of the Assumption of the Virgin Mary

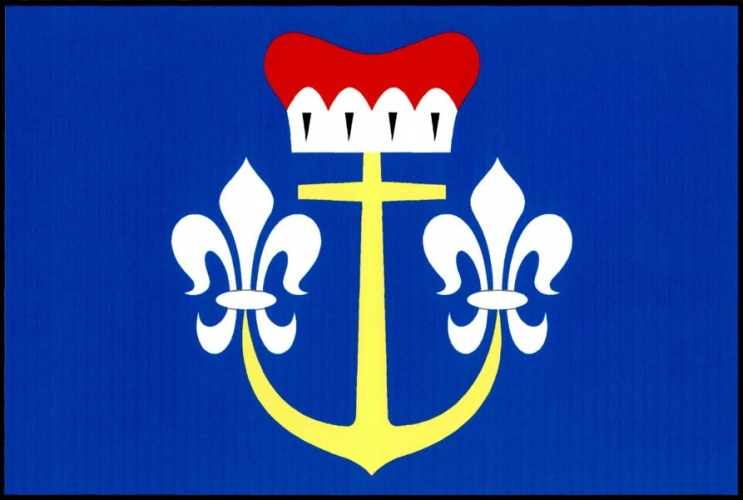
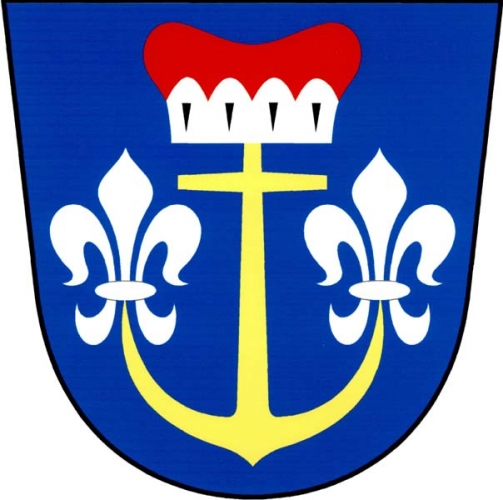
- Flag Coat of arms

- Location in the Czech Republic
- Coordinates: 49°58′5″N 16°5′24″E
- Country: Czech Republic
- Region: Pardubice
- District: Ústí nad Orlicí
- First mentioned: 1073

Area
  - Total: 13.90 km^{2} (5.37 sq mi)
- Elevation: 310 m (1,020 ft)

Population (2026-01-01)
  - Total: 749
  - Density: 53.9/km^{2} (140/sq mi)
- Time zone: UTC+1 (CET)
  - Summer (DST): UTC+2 (CEST)
- Postal code: 565 42
- Website: www.obecvraclav.cz

Vraclav (German: Wratzlau) is a municipality and village in Ústí nad Orlicí District in the Pardubice Region of the Czech Republic. It has about 700 inhabitants.

== Administrative division ==
Vraclav consists of three municipal parts (in brackets population according to the 2021 census):

- Vraclav (547)
- Sedlec (147)
- Svatý Mikuláš (62)

== Etymology ==
The initial name of the village was Vratislav, derived from the personal name Vratislav. From the 16th century, the shortened form Vraclav appeared.

== Geography ==
Vraclav is located about 22 kilometres (14 mi) west of Ústí nad Orlicí and 23 km (14 mi) southeast of Pardubice. It lies in the Svitavy Uplands. The highest point is the Kamenec hill at 337 m (1,106 ft) above sea level. The Loučná River flows along the northern municipal border.

== History ==
A gord was established here in the mid-11th century. The first written mention of Vraclav is from 1073.

== Demographics ==
Historical population

Year	Pop.	±%
1869	1,350	—
1880	1,439	+6.6%
1890	1,424	−1.0%
1900	1,408	−1.1%
1910	1,369	−2.8%

Year	Pop.	±%
1921	1,372	+0.2%
1930	1,372	+0.0%
1950	1,021	−25.6%
1961	938	−8.1%
1970	893	−4.8%

Year	Pop.	±%
1980	862	−3.5%
1991	806	−6.5%
2001	739	−8.3%
2011	723	−2.2%
2021	756	+4.6%

Source: Censuses

== Transport ==
The I/17 road (which is here shortly a part of the European route E442) passes through the northern part of the municipality.

== Sights ==
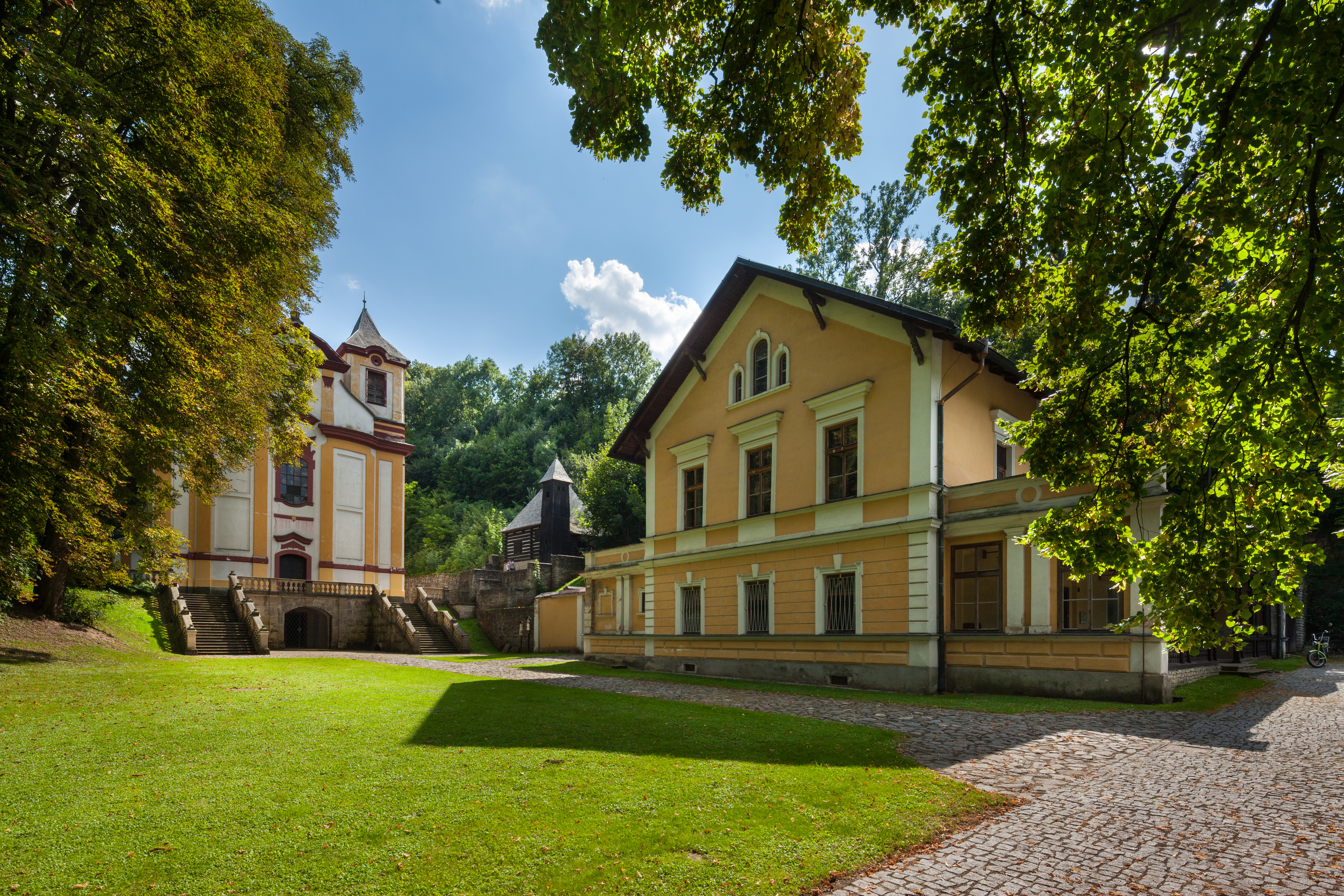
Baroque complex of Saint Nicholas

The main landmark is the Baroque complex of the former pilgrimage Church of Saint Nicholas. In 1711, a spa was established here, near a spring of water that was considered curative. A local chapel was replaced by the church in 1724–1726. The spa and the pilgrimage site almost disappeared in the first half of the 19th century. The complex was reconstructed in 1976–1986. In the former church is an exposition managed by the Vysoké Mýto Regional Museum.

== Notable people ==
- Jiří Paďour (1943–2015), Roman Catholic bishop
