= Alois Hába =

Czech music educator and composer

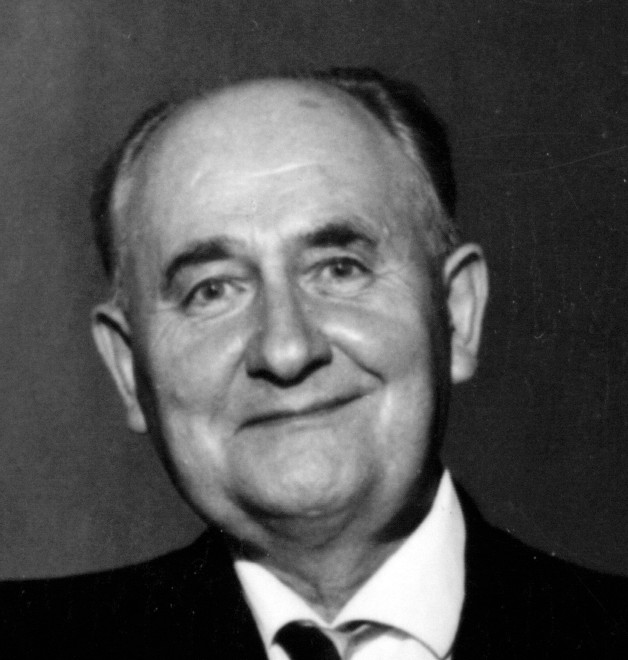
Hába in 1957

Alois Hába (21 June 1893 – 18 November 1973) was a Czech composer, music theorist and teacher. He belongs to the important discoverers in modern classical music, and to the major composers of microtonal music, especially using the quarter-tone scale, though he used others such as sixth-tones (e.g., in the 5th, 10th and 11th String Quartets), fifth-tones (Sixteenth String Quartet), and twelfth-tones. From the other microtonal conceptions, he discussed a "three-quarter tone" system (see three-quarter tone flat and the neutral second) in his theoretical works but he used scales in this tuning in sections of some of his compositions. In his prolific career, Hába composed three operas, an enormous collection of chamber music including 16 string quartets, piano, organ and choral pieces, some orchestral works and songs. He also had special keyboard and woodwind instruments constructed that were capable of playing quarter-tone scales.

== Life ==
Alois Hába was born in the small town of Vizovice in Moravian Wallachia, into a family of 10 children. When he was five years old it was discovered that he had absolute pitch. He and his family often played and sang their native Wallachian folk songs, actively participated in church singing and folk-music performances. In school, Alois became very interested in the musical aspects of the Czech language, above all in pitch, rhythm, accent, dynamics, and timbre of the speech. In 1908 he entered the teachers' training college in Kroměříž, where he began to develop an interest in Czech national music, analyzing the works of Bedřich Smetana. Already at that time he found out from his textbooks that the European system of music was not the only one in the world and that even some European music had in the past used different scales than the ones used in his time. He therefore started to develop his own point of view in this issue. After finishing his studies, he got a job as teacher in Bílovice, a small town near the Hungarian (now Slovak) border. Simultaneously, he continued his own musical studies and in 1913 wrote his first compositions, displaying an unwillingness to "follow the rules", which he maintained all his life. Hába was dissatisfied by small-town life, and in 1914, he moved to Prague and became a pupil of neoromantic composer Vítězslav Novák. Here he was interested in analysing the works of Claude Debussy, Max Reger, Alexander Scriabin, and Richard Strauss, and in harmonization of Moravian folk music.

=== Vienna ===
During World War I, he served in the Austrian Army on the Russian and Italian front from 1915 until early 1918, when he was moved to Vienna, where he worked in the music department of the Austrian-Hungarian Ministry of War. There he almost immediately became a student of Franz Schreker, who brought out his more radical tendencies. At that time, Hába wrote his first quarter-tone piece, Suite, consisting of three fugues in the quarter-tone system, composed for two pianos tuned a quarter tone apart. Remaining in Vienna after the war, Hába attended the concerts produced by Arnold Schönberg's Verein für musikalische Privataufführungen, and became particularly influenced by the "athematic" style used by Schönberg in his Erwartung. First publications of his compositions included the String Quartet No. 2, his first major quarter-tone work which was composed in 1920. At that time, his lifelong friendship with Hanns Eisler – with whom he shared political beliefs (Hába became an ardent communist at this time) as well as musical opinions – began.

=== Berlin ===
Hába found his first success as a composer in Berlin, where he followed his teacher Schreker in late 1920. He published his first theoretical treatise (in Czech), the small booklet Harmonické základy čtvrttónové soustavy (Harmonic Essentials of the Quarter-tone System). In 1923, he met Ferruccio Busoni, who had advocated the sixth-tone system and encouraged Hába to continue his work in microtonality. The same year, Hába began to attempt the establishment of a school of microtonal music, but as the Nazis started to gain power in Germany, he came under attack and was driven out of Berlin. He returned to Prague and managed to get a job teaching workshops at the Prague Conservatory.

=== Prague ===
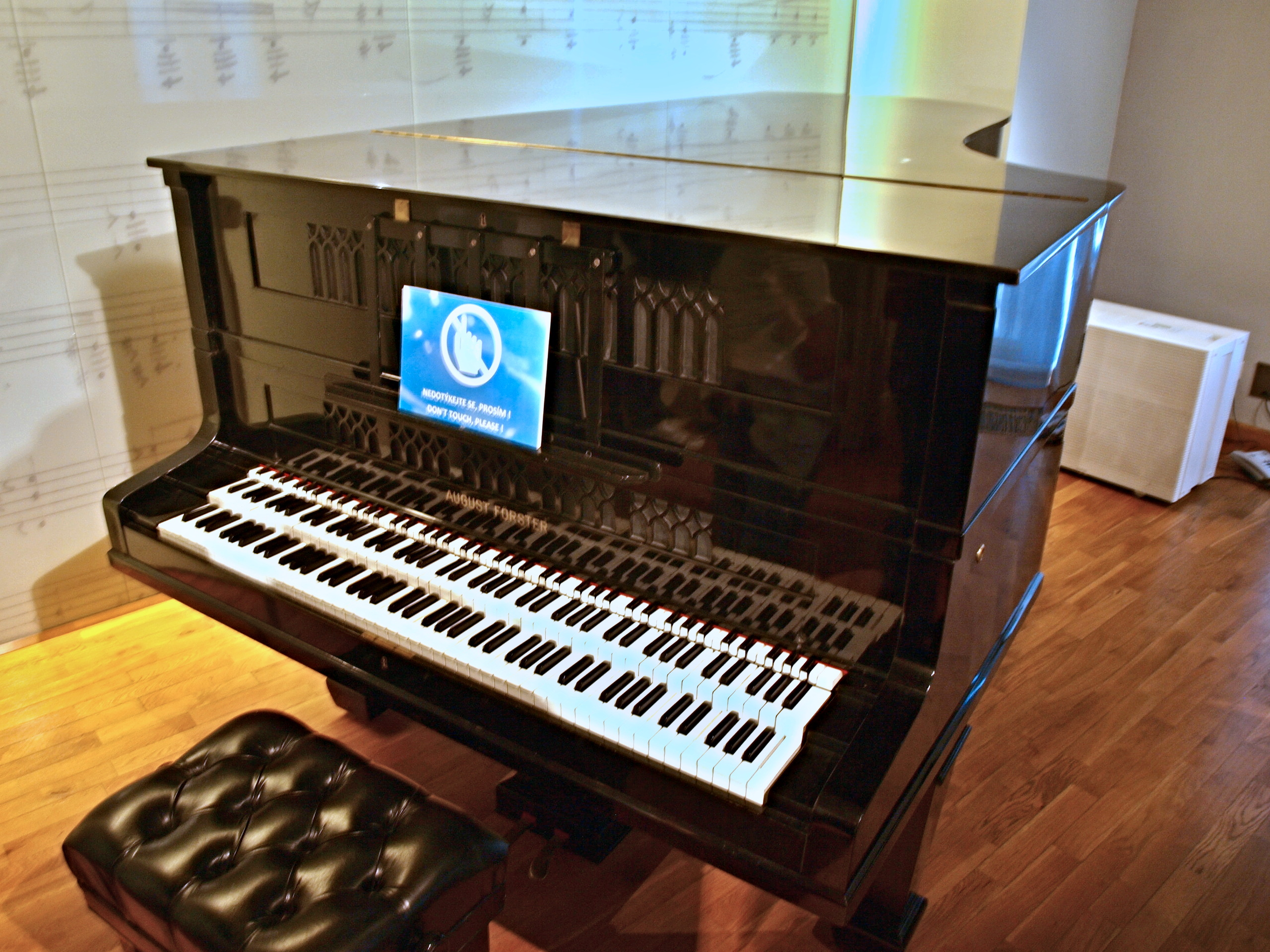
Quarter-tone grand piano (1924) designed by Hába, built by Förster firm; it consists of two independent bodies, features the three manuals (aux. short key/quarter tone higher/normal). (exhibited at Czech Museum of Music)

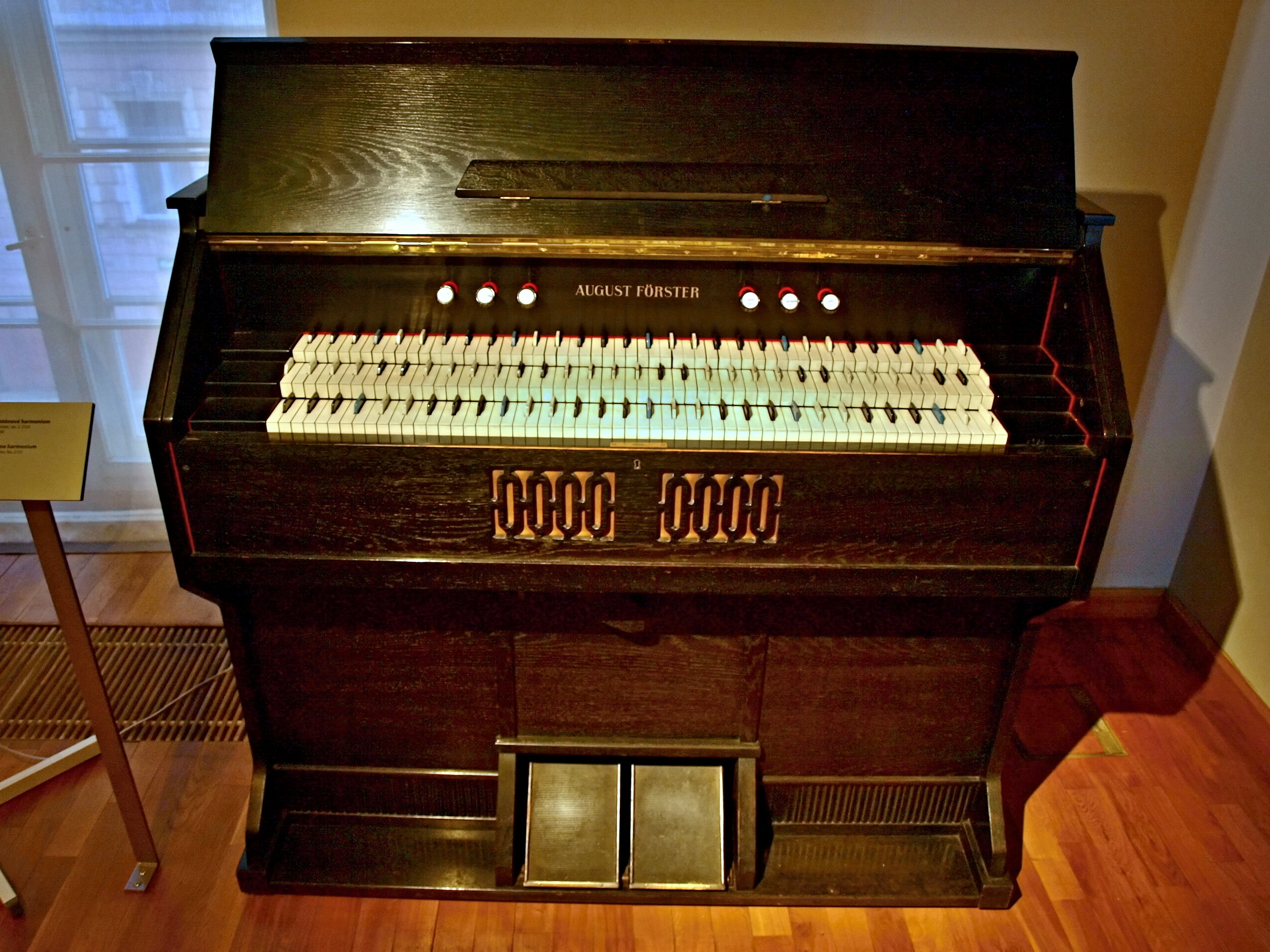
Sixth-tone harmonium (1937) designed by Hába, built by Förster firm; it features triple-reed, three manuals, two knee levers, and six registers. (exhibited at Czech Museum of Music)

In July 1923 at the festival of modern music in Donaueschingen, the Amar-Hindemith Quartet played Hába's quarter-tone String Quartet No. 3. His name began to appear alongside other representatives of his generation's avant-garde musicians and, thanks to him, Czechoslovakia became one of the first member countries of the International Society for Contemporary Music. Hába wrote several theoretical articles on microtonality, athematicism, and church modes at this time. In 1925 he wrote his major theoretical work New Harmony-Textbook of the Diatonic, Chromatic, Quarter-, Third-, Sixth-, and Twelfth-tone Systems (if necessary, see: diatonic, chromatic). He designed and had built two quarter-tone pianos by early 1924 and a third in 1925. In 1927, the Czech branch factory of the German piano firm August Förster in the North Bohemian town of Jiříkov built for him a sixth-tone harmonium, patterned mostly after the design by Busoni.

After the premiere of his quarter-tone opera Matka (Mother) in 1931, introducing a practically athematic concept, Hába emerged as a leader of Czech modernist music and became internationally well known as one of the most important avantgarde composers. This opera also uses two quarter-tone clarinets and two quarter-tone trumpets, which were built especially for this work. In 1934, he composed the opera Nová země (The New Earth) in the twelve-tone system. Athematic constructions characteristic of his work appeared also later in the opera Přijď království tvé (Thy Kingdom Come) (1940), which is written in the sixth-tone system. In all three operas, Hába expressed his bold socialist viewpoint, that caused controversies already at the time. For instance, the production of Nová Země (the plot of which deals with the Holodomor in Ukraine and how the Holodomor in a Ukrainian village is defeated by socialisation of production) and founding the kolkhoz Nová Země (The New Earth) by National Theatre in Prague in 1936 had to be cancelled by intervention from the Ministry of Culture as communist and pro-soviet propaganda.

In 1933, when Josef Suk became director of the Prague Conservatory, Hába was made a full professor and established the Department of Quarter-tone and Sixth-tone Music. Here he had much influence over his many students. It was also the early 1930s that saw the writing of what is probably Hába's most important orchestral work, the symphonic fantasy Cesta života (The Path of Life). The 1930s also shaped Hába's political stance and philosophy of life. His strong sense of social commitment found an intellectual basis in the anthroposophical teachings of Rudolf Steiner.

In 1939 the German Nazis occupied Czechoslovakia and banned performance of Hába's work. They closed down the Prague Conservatory in 1941 and prevented him from teaching. During the war Hába wrote a continuation of his Theory of Harmony, completed, as already mentioned, a sixth-tone opera (which was never produced), and considered constructing a twelfth-tone harmonium.

After World War II, he resumed teaching and held several administrative positions. At the turn of forties and fifties, the work of Alois Hába was affected by the communist regime in Czechoslovakia, becoming transitionally simplified, much more "thematic" and tonal, and also setting texts projecting communist ideology. He was nevertheless unable to rid himself of the label of “formalist” stuck onto him by Marxist aesthetics.

In 1953 he was sent into retirement, but in his own words it was only at that point that he achieved real creative freedom. In 1957 he was named an honorary member of the ISCM. When Hába returned to his style, he continued in his experimental musical studies, which culminated in the 1960s with the use of fifth tones in his Sixteenth String Quartet in 1967. This work was premiered in the same year at the ISCM festival in Prague, performing by Novák Quartet.

Hába was a prolific composer and continued to compose almost to the end of his life. He taught and influenced many musicians. Besides followers in his own country, Hába attracted students from South Slavic countries (Slovenia, Serbia, Bulgaria), Lithuania, Turkey, and elsewhere. The Prague Conservatory in general enjoyed an international reputation, and a great deal of credit for that goes to the contacts and pioneering efforts of Alois Hába. Despite these facts, he died in relative obscurity in Prague in 1973.

== Concept ==
Quarter-tone music, Hába was convinced, would represent a major enrichment of European musical language. As he repeatedly stated, it was the genuine folk music of his own native region that led him to the idea of enriching European musical language with smaller intervals than the half-tones that are usual in European genuine folk music.

It was with these words that Alois Hába introduced a concert of works composed by himself and his students on 13 March 1945 in the Municipal Library in Prague:

Often just raising the apex of a melody by a mere half-tone, a quarter-tone or a sixth-tone, just prolonging or shortening a certain passage by a single beat, just livening up or rearranging the rhythm will be enough to achieve some satisfactory musical expressivity. This work is like polishing a precious stone. Perfect polishing increases its value. And only the ability to do such polishing guarantees composers perfection in their creative work and certainty in their ability to evaluate their own work and that of others.

All three areas of Alois Hába’s activity – composing, teaching, and organizing – evince one of his fundamental characteristics: the courage to move into a territory where no one else had thus far dared go. Hába was not some kind of “microinterval fanatic” as is sometimes assumed. He did offer his students this path, but he never compelled them to travel it. He was an example of musical perseverance, and although the worldwide universal musical language which he strove to create proved to be a utopia, his importance for the development of music in the 20th century is unparalleled.

== Works ==
Alois Hába's works total 103 opuses, the majority of which are various kinds of chamber music. Among the most important are his string quartets, which document and demonstrate the development of his style. In addition to quarter tones, Hába used sixth-tones in his String Quartets nos. in the 5, 10, and 11, as well as in Six Pieces for Sixth-tone Harmonium or String Quartet (1928), Duo for Sixth-tone Violins (1937), Thy Kingdom Come, a Sixth-tone Musical Drama in Seven Scenes (1937–42), Suite in Sixth-tones for Solo Violin (1955), and Suite in Sixth-tones for Solo Cello (1955). For a detailed survey, see complete list of compositions.

== Representative recordings ==
- Complete String Quartets (4 CDs, Bayer Records, Germany, 2006), performed by the Czech ensemble Stamic Quartet
- Four Fugues for Organ as the part of the album Alois Hába / Miloslav Kabeláč / Jan Hora / Petr Čech – Complete Organ Works (Vixen, Czech Republic, 2001, CD)
- Complete Nonets. The Czech Nonet (Supraphon, Czech Republic, 1995)
- Czech Music of the 20th Century: Alois Hába – Chamber Music. Suk Quartet and Czech Nonet (Praga, France, 1993)
- Mother by Prague National Theatre Orchestra, chorus and soloists (Supraphon, Czechoslovakia, 1966, 1980 & 1982 – 2LPs; CD)
- Hába - 'The Complete Piano Works' - Miroslav Beinhauer, piano (recorded 2019-2024) (Supraphon, 2025)

== See also ==
- List of compositions by Alois Hába
