= Vysoké Mýto Regional Museum =

- Regionální muzeum ve Vysokém Mýtě

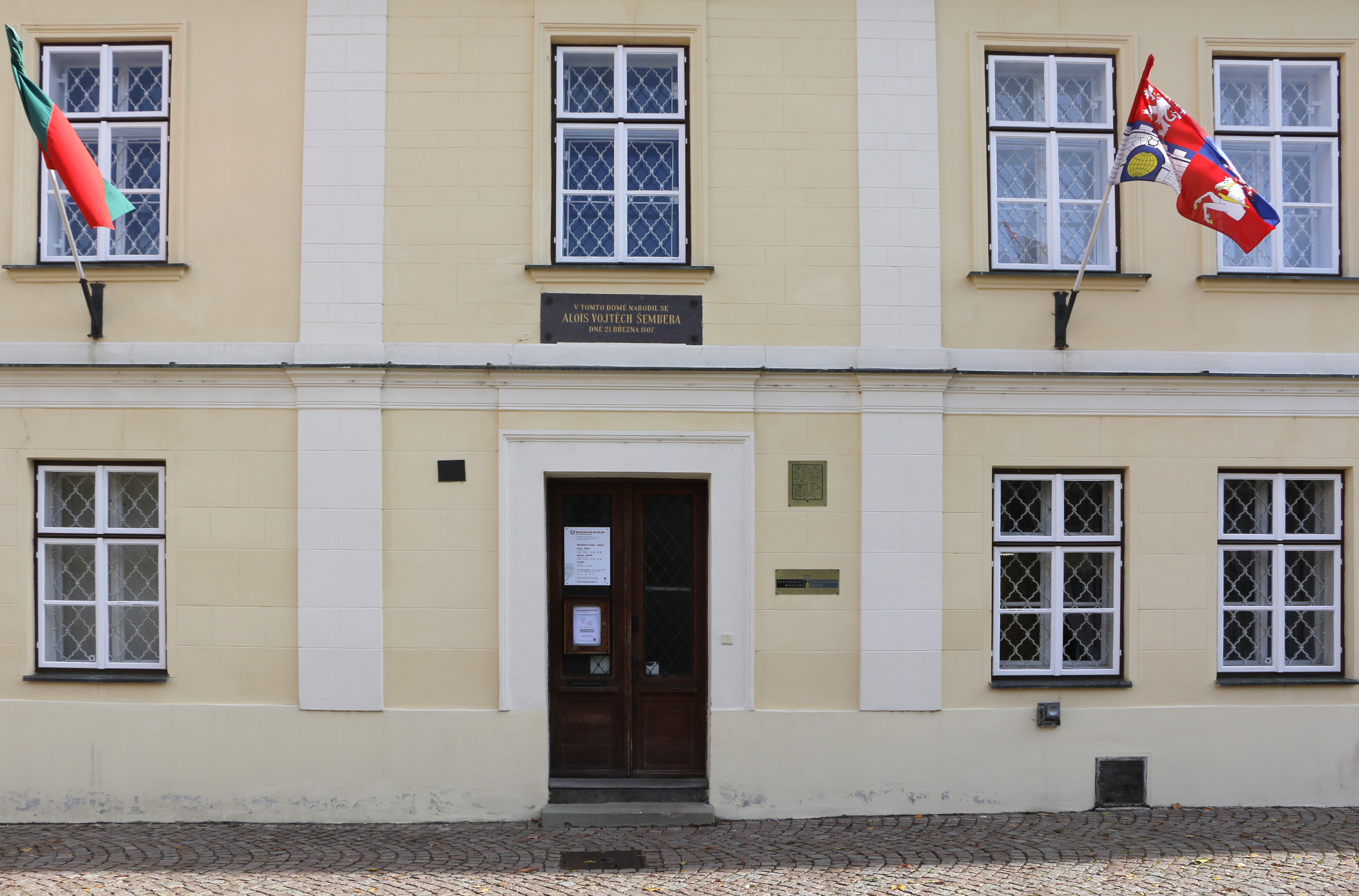
- Established: 1871
- Location: A. V. Šembery 125, Vysoké Mýto, Czech Republic, 566 01
- Coordinates: 49.954686°N 16.158908°E
- Website: Official website

Vysoké Mýto Regional Museum (Czech: Regionální muzeum ve Vysokém Mýtě) covers history of the area around the town Vysoké Mýto, Czech Republic.

== History ==
In 1871, a town councilor began a collection of coins and paintings, gifts from local citizens, and put them in a room in the town hall for public viewing. Initial interest in the collection faded, but six years later a young architect, Josef Škorpil, re-initiated the project. Volunteers gathered antiquities from the area and exhibited them locally and countrywide. In 1912, the collections were moved into a house bought by the museum.

During reorganisation in 1960, the museum was transformed into an official county museum. It was professionalized, expanded, and its collections underwent expert processing. Later, the museum expanded into two other historical houses.

== Exhibitions and activities ==
The main building of the museum hosts most of the exhibitions, including an archaeological and artistic-industrial collection, a collection of citizens' portraits, and sections on ethnography and history of craft and guilds. The Prague Gate (Pražská brána), a remainder of the city fortification from the 14th century, hosts the permanent exhibition of pictures documenting changes in Vysoké Mýto since the first half of 19th century.

The Baroque areal Vraclav (about 6 km from the Vysoké Mýto, in the village of Vraclav) includes St. Nicholas' Church, a spa and a hermitage. The areal hosts an exhibition about the history of the community. In the church there is a collection of wooden polychromed Baroque plastics, created around 1740.

Among the available collections (80 thousand collection items totally) are: a numismatic collection; a collection of old printings; Czech National Revival literature; textiles, glass, and ceramics; graphics, iconographics, and photography collections. The museum also owns a historical car "Aero 50 Dynamik", one of the seven luxury cars produced in Vysoké Mýto in 1939–1941.

The museum participates in cultural life of the town by organizing lectures, balls and concerts. The main building is open year except Mondays; the two other locations are open from May to September.
