= Marta Jiráčková =

Czech composer (born 1932)

Marta Jiráčková (born 22 March 1932) is a Czech composer.

== Biography ==
Marta Jiráčková was born in Kladno. She studied with Emil Hlobil at the Prague Conservatory of Music, and after graduating in 1959, took a job in Czechoslovak Radio as a music editor. She studied harmony and composition with Alois Hába from 1962 until 1964, and took a break from composition when she married conductor Václav Jiráček. After her husband died in an accident, she returned to study and composition in the 1970s in Brno with Ctirad Kohoutek and Alois Piňos at the Janáček Academy of Music and Performing Arts. Her composition Loď bláznů (The Ship of Fools) was awarded the 1992 Prize of the Czech Music Fund.

== Works ==
Jiráčková has composed more than forty works, including vocal music, chamber music, symphonies, ballet, and music for radio and television. Selected works include:

Orchestral works:

- Sláva Vorlová's Confession, symphonic sketch with solo trumpet and soprano. Op. 8 (1973)
- Nanda Devi, Symphony No. 1, with children's and female chorus and tower bells, Op. 25 (1979)
- Ave Seikilos, composition in one movement for strings and percussion, Op. 31 (1983)
- The Butterfly Effect, composition for violoncello solo, string orchestra and percussion, Op. 32 (1984)
- Silbo, Symphony No. 2 for large orchestra with an Interlude for children's chorus, Op. 34 (1986–87)
- A lesson of Composition, Three Movements for organ, string orchestra and percussion, Op. 35 (1988)

Chamber works:

- Four Preludes, an Interlude and a Postlude for piano, Op. 5 (1972–73)
- Variations on a Borrowed Theme, for a chamber ensemble, Op. 14 (1975)
- Three Songs Without Lyrics, for soprano, flute, horn, clarinet, bass clarinet, violoncello, celesta and percussion, Op. 21 (1977)
- The Blankenburg Fugue, for string quartet, Op. 33 (1985)
- Imago vitae, suite for organ, Op. 36 (1989)
- Variations on the Policy of Queen Hatshepsovet, for two pianos Op. 37 (1989)
- Dodekaria I, sonata for violin and piano. Op. 38 (1990)
- Dodekaria II, sonata for dulcimer and flute, Op. 42 (1992)
- Dodekaria Tristis (III), sonata for basset horn and piano, Op. 43 (1992)
- Die Warheit über Sancho Panza (The Truth About Sancho Panza), for narrator, flute, bassoon, violoncello and percussion, Op. 48 (1993)
- Centre of Gravity of Humanity, for 8 double-reed woodwind instruments, Op. 49 (1993)
- Růžová pivoňka (The Pink Peony; Die Rosa Pfingstrose), fantasie on the painting by Bohumil Klimeš-Kozina for viola and piano, Op. 56 (2000)

Vocal compositions:

- Lokh Geet, cycle of female choruses, op.2 (1972)
- Just So, five duos for soprano and flute to a text by J. Prévert, Op. 3 (1972)
- I, Charles Lounsbury, cantate for baritone and piano, Op. 7 (1973)
- Eight Wonders of the World, eight scenes for voices, harp and percussion, Op. 18 (1976)
- De corde, chamber composition for soprano, piano and tower bell to words by Jan Tausinger, Op. 29 (1982)
- Svatý Václave (Saint Wenceslas), Evocation of the Ancient Choral Manuscript for soprano, viola and piano, Op. 39 (1991), or for mezzo-soprano and organ, Op. 39a (1992)
- There you go, Fresco for soprano, reciter and piano trio to the words of the New Zealand poet David Howard, Op. 59 (2007)

Electroacoustic compositions:

- Lullaby, radio musical image (synthetic montage), Op. 23a (1978)
- Loď bláznů (The Ship of Fools), ballet music after Hieronymus Bosch, Op. 40 (1991) note: Part II of a two part ballet (together with Op. 45)
- View from the Balcony, suite in seven parts, Op. 41 (1991)
- Bees and the Sunflower for flute and tape, Op. 44 (1992)
- Five Times a Woman, ballet variation for female voice and synthesizer, Op. 45 (1992) note: part I of a two-part ballet (together with Op. 40)
