= Kobeliarovo =

Kobeliarovo Kisfeketepatak
- Municipality
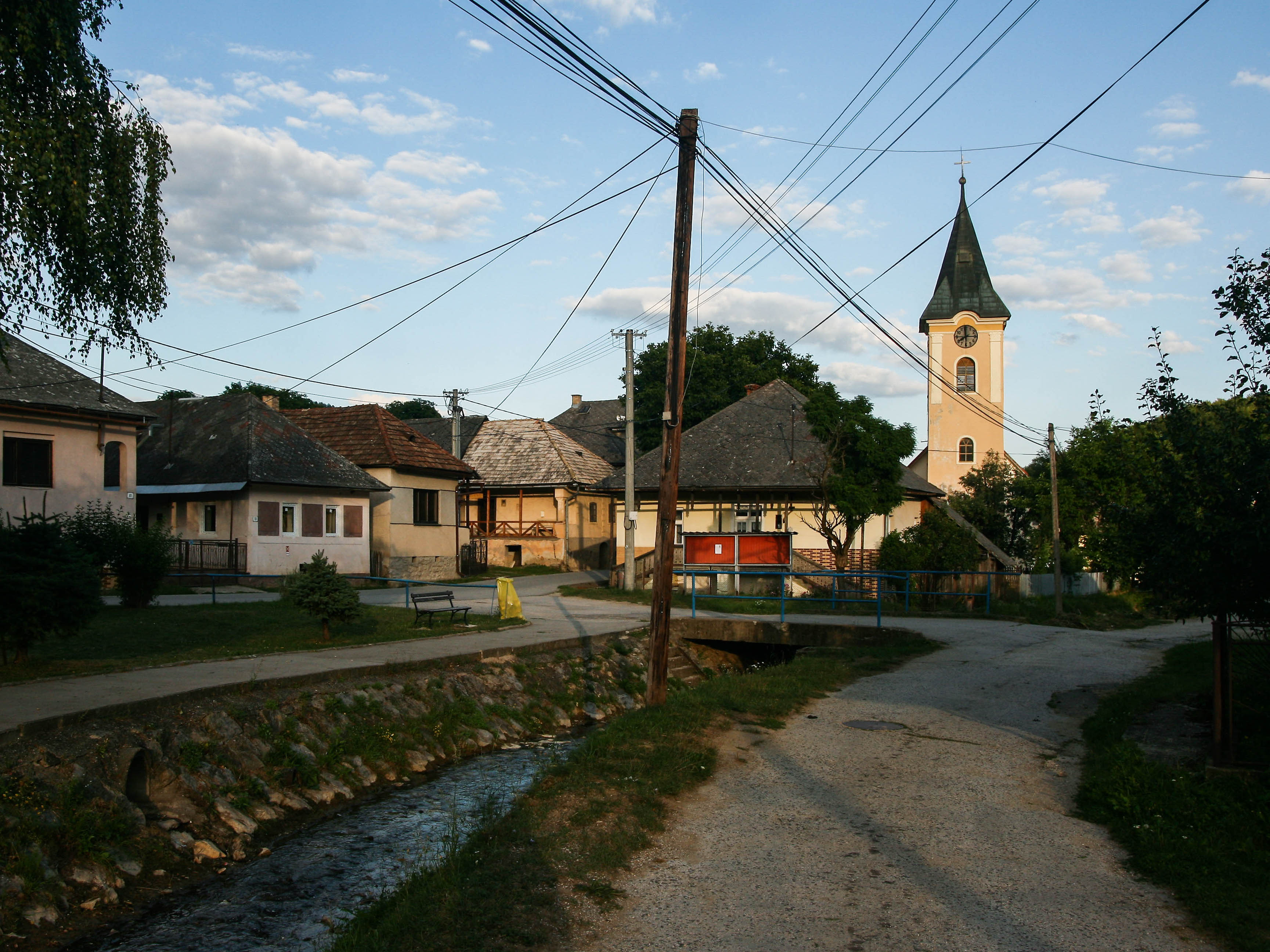

- Flag

- Location of Kobeliarovo in the Košice Region Location of Kobeliarovo in Slovakia
- Coordinates: 48.75°N 20.37°E
- Country: Slovakia
- Region: Košice Region
- District: Rožňava District
- First mentioned: 1466

Area
  - Total: 12.02 km^{2} (4.64 sq mi)
- Elevation: 455 m (1,493 ft)

Population (2025)
  - Total: 512
- Time zone: UTC+1 (CET)
  - Summer (DST): UTC+2 (CEST)
- Postal code: 492 3
- Area code: +421 58
- Vehicle registration plate (until 2022): RV
- Website: www.kobeliarovo.sk

Kobeliarovo (1466 Fekethepathak,. 1551 Kobelar, 1773 Kobelarow ) (German: Schwarzseifen; Hungarian: Kisfeketepatak) is a village and municipality in the Rožňava District in the Košice Region of middle-eastern Slovakia.

== History ==
In historical records the village was first mentioned in 1466 as Bebek noble family's property in the Kingdom of Hungary. In the 17th century, noble Hungarians Andrássy ruled the village. Before the establishment of independent Czechoslovakia in 1918, Kobeliarovo was part of Gömör and Kishont County within the Kingdom of Hungary. From 1939 to 1945, it was part of the Slovak Republic.

== Geography ==
The municipality lies at an altitude of 455 metres (1,493 ft) and covers an area of 12.02 km^{2} (4.64 sq mi) (2025).

== Population ==
Population statistic (10 years)
Year	1995	2005	2015	2025
Count	422	439	469	512
Difference		+4.02%	+6.83%	+9.16%

Population statistic
Year	2024	2025
Count	509	512
Difference		+0.58%

It has a population of 512 people (31 December 2025).

=== Ethnicity ===
Census 2021 (1+ %)
Ethnicity	Number	Fraction
Slovak	485	98.37%
Romani	254	51.52%
Not found out	6	1.21%
Total	493	

In year 2021 was 493 people by ethnicity 485 as Slovak, 254 as Romani, 6 as Not found out, 3 as Czech, 3 as Hungarian and 1 as German.

Note on population: The difference values of population numbers in the table "Population statistic" and in the sections "Ethnicity" & "Religion" is caused by the use of various statistical methods.

=== Religion ===
Census 2021 (1+ %)
Religion	Number	Fraction
None	276	55.98%
Evangelical Church	183	37.12%
Roman Catholic Church	22	4.46%
Not found out	6	1.22%
Total	493	

In year 2021 was 493 people by religion 276 from None, 183 from Evangelical Church, 22 from Roman Catholic Church, 6 from Not found out, 3 from Ad hoc movements, 2 from United Methodist Church and 1 from Greek Catholic Church.

== Culture ==
The village has a public library.

== Famous people ==
- Pavel Jozef Šafárik, scientist

== Genealogical resources ==
The records for genealogical research are available at the state archive "Statny Archiv in Kosice, Slovakia"

- Lutheran church records (births/marriages/deaths): 1744-1952 (parish A)

== See also ==
- List of municipalities and towns in Slovakia
