= Dowry town =

Dowry town (Czech: věnné město) was a town that had been devoted by a Bohemian king to his wife – the queen consort.

This was sometimes indicated by the name of the town, as in the case of Hradec Králové (Castle of the Queen), Dvůr Králové nad Labem (Court of the Queen on the Elbe) or Městec Králové (Townlet of the Queen). Other well-known Czech dowry towns are: Mělník, Chrudim, Jaroměř, Nový Bydžov, Polička, Trutnov and Vysoké Mýto.

== History ==
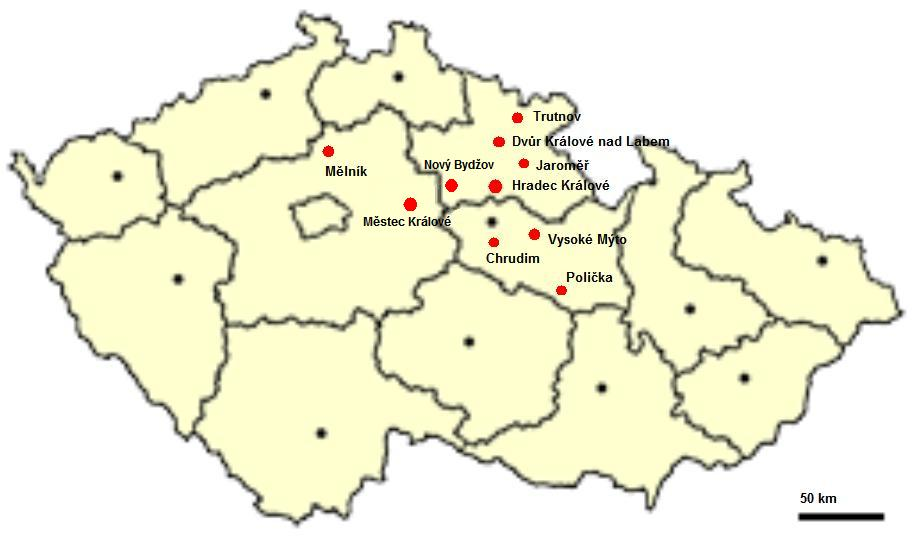
Location of dowry towns in today's Czech Republic

All these towns had been bequeathed by Bohemian kings to their wives since the beginning of the 14th century. Most of them are located in eastern Bohemia.

- Hradec Králové, Chrudim and Vysoké Mýto were given to Elizabeth Richeza by Wenceslaus II, later Charles IV donated them to Elizabeth of Pomerania.
- Other towns were donated later, the last one being Nový Bydžov in 1569.
- Since 1603 they were administered separately from other royal towns.
- After Battle of the White Mountain (1621) their importance started to vanish.
- In 1918 all legal forms of dowry towns finally ceased to exist.

Historical centres of the towns are well preserved until today. From time to time cultural or sport events are organised together.

== Royal towns ==
Towns owned and directly administered by the king were titled royal towns. 16th century Bohemia had around forty royal and dowry towns. These towns were the eternal property of the monarch and couldn't be sold or used as guarantee of a debt although it happened quite often. These towns and their inhabitants had many economic and social privileges. For example, after Hussite Wars such cities formed the Third estate.
