= Hermenegild Jireček =

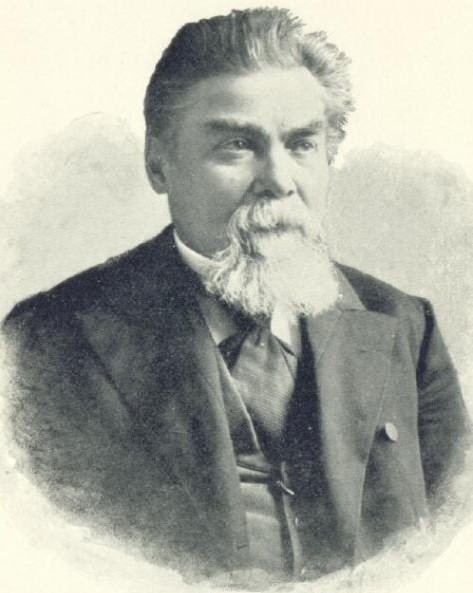

Hermenegild Jireček, Knight of Samokov (Czech: Hermenegild Jireček, rytíř ze Samokovu; 13 April 1827 – 29 December 1909) was a Czech jurist, legal and literary historian, and author of works on these topics.

Jireček was born in Vysoké Mýto in Bohemia, Austrian Empire. He was an official in the Prague bureau of education. His brother Josef Jireček was also a noted scholar.

Among his important works on Slavonic law were Codex juris bohemici (11 parts, 1867–1892), and a Collection of Slav Folk-Law (Czech, 1880), Slav Law in Bohemia and Moravia down to the 19th Century (Czech, 3 vols. 1863–1873).
