= Vysoké Mýto =

Town in the Czech Republic

- Town
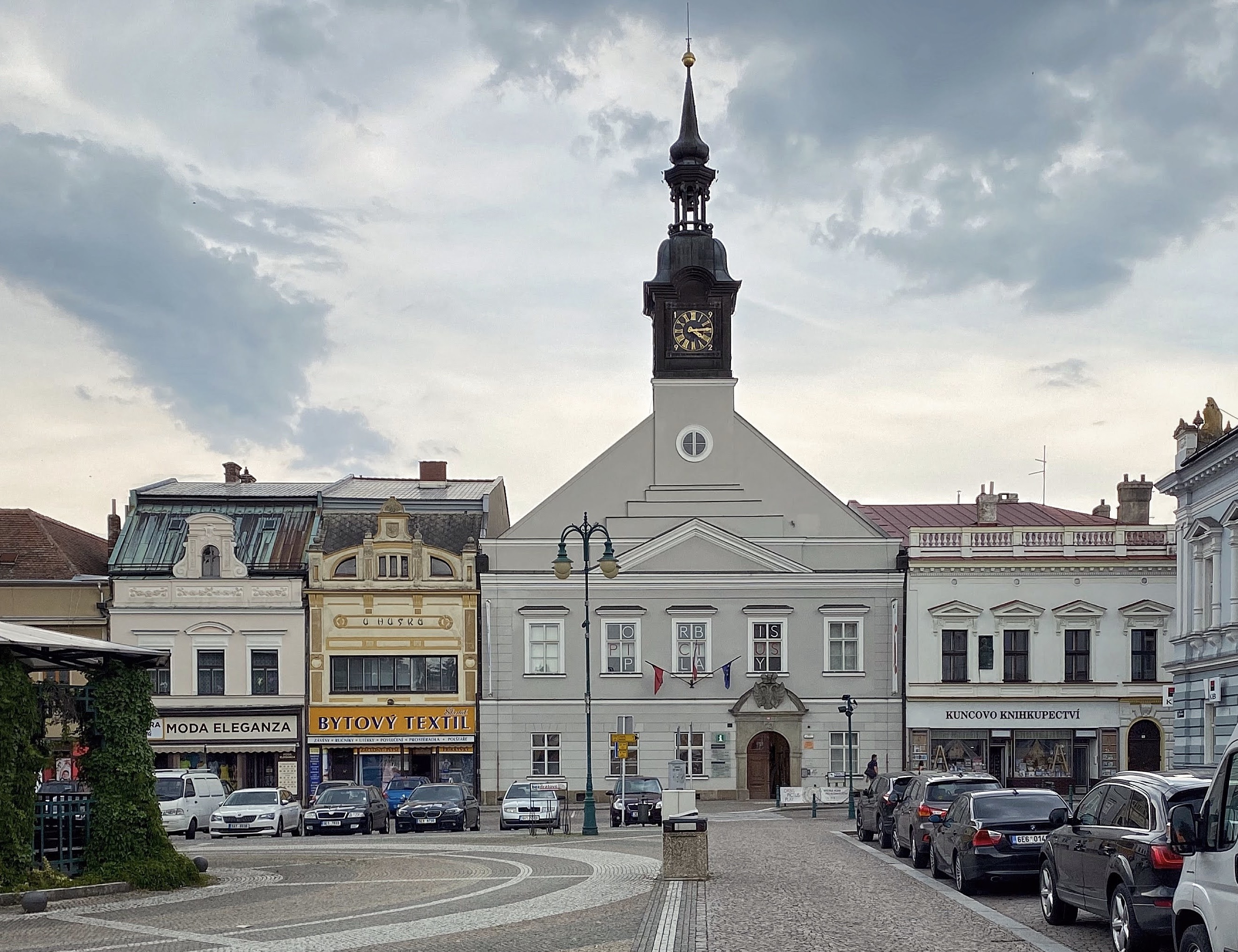
- The square Náměstí Přemysla Otakara II.

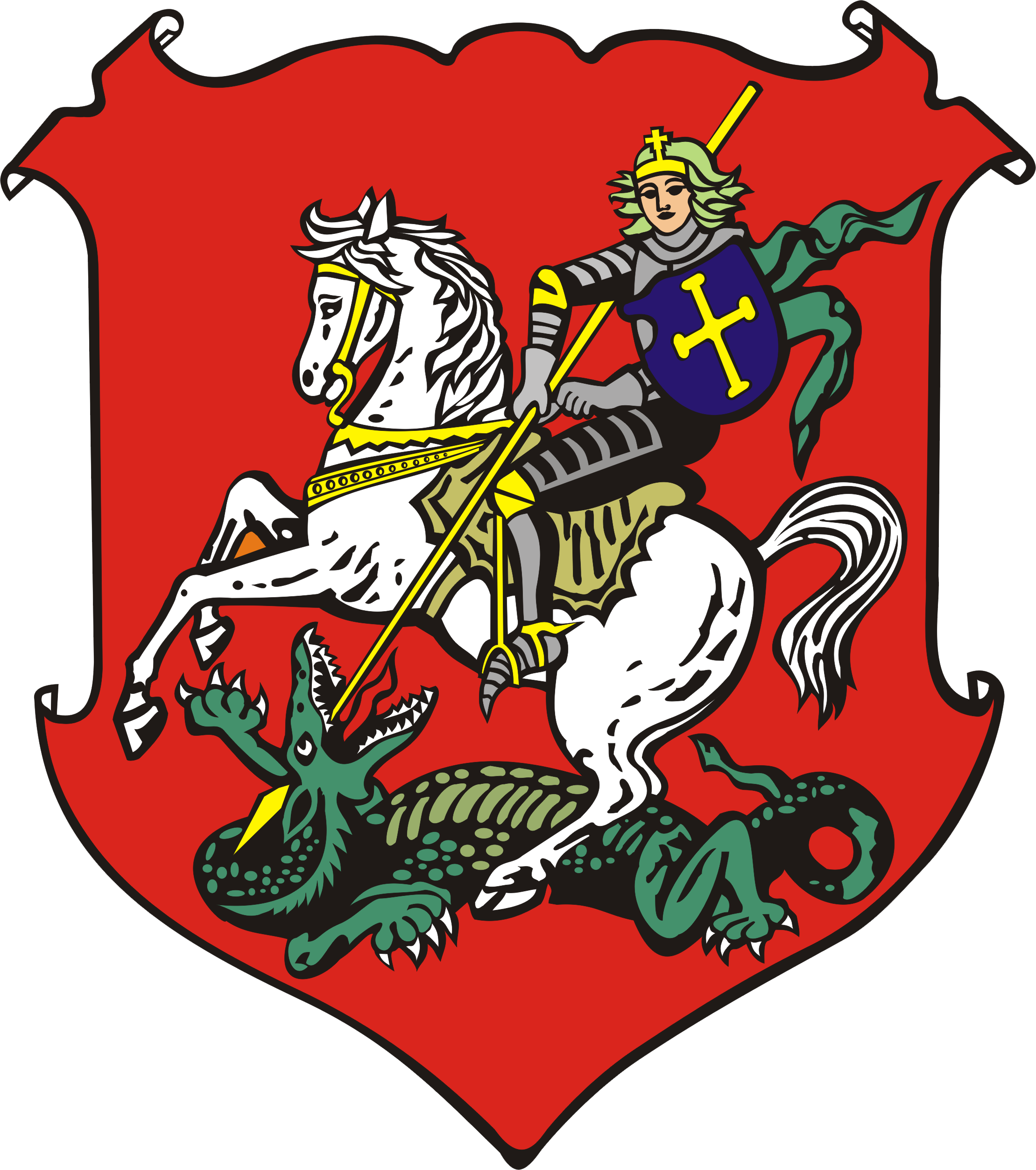
- Flag Coat of arms

- Location in the Czech Republic
- Coordinates: 49°57′12″N 16°9′42″E
- Country: Czech Republic
- Region: Pardubice
- District: Ústí nad Orlicí
- First mentioned: 1265

Government
  - Mayor: František Jiraský

Area
  - Total: 42.03 km^{2} (16.23 sq mi)
- Elevation: 284 m (932 ft)

Population (2026-01-01)
  - Total: 12,849
  - Density: 305.7/km^{2} (791.8/sq mi)
- Time zone: UTC+1 (CET)
  - Summer (DST): UTC+2 (CEST)
- Postal code: 566 01
- Website: www.vysoke-myto.cz

Vysoké Mýto (Czech pronunciation: [ˈvɪsokɛː ˈmiːto]; German: Hohenmaut, also Hohenmauth) is a town in Ústí nad Orlicí District in the Pardubice Region of the Czech Republic. It has about 13,000 inhabitants. The town is located on the Loučná River in the Svitavy Uplands. It is known for an Iveco Bus factory.

In the Middle Ages, Vysoké Mýto was a dowry town administered by Bohemian queens. It has one of the largest town squares in the Czech Republic. The historic town centre is well preserved and is protected as an urban monument zone. The main landmark of Vysoké Mýto is the Church of Saint Lawrence. The Vysoké Mýto Regional Museum is the oldest town museum in the country.

== Administrative division ==
Vysoké Mýto consists of ten municipal parts (in brackets population according to the 2021 census):

- Vysoké Mýto-Město (807)
- Choceňské Předměstí (1,677)
- Litomyšlské Předměstí (6,275)
- Pražské Předměstí (2,706)
- Brteč (98)
- Domoradice (166)
- Knířov (46)
- Lhůta (102)
- Svařeň (85)
- Vanice (107)

== Etymology ==
The predecessor of the town was a small settlement by a trade route called Mýto (literally 'toll' in Czech). After a new town was founded, it adopted the privilege of collecting the toll. The old settlement was renamed to Staré Mýto ('old toll') and the new town was called Vysoké Mýto ('high toll'), probably referring to its location above the old settlement.

== Geography ==
Vysoké Mýto is located about 27 kilometres (17 mi) southeast of Pardubice. It lies in the Svitavy Uplands. The highest point is at 436 m (1,430 ft) above sea level. The Loučná River flows through the town.

== History ==
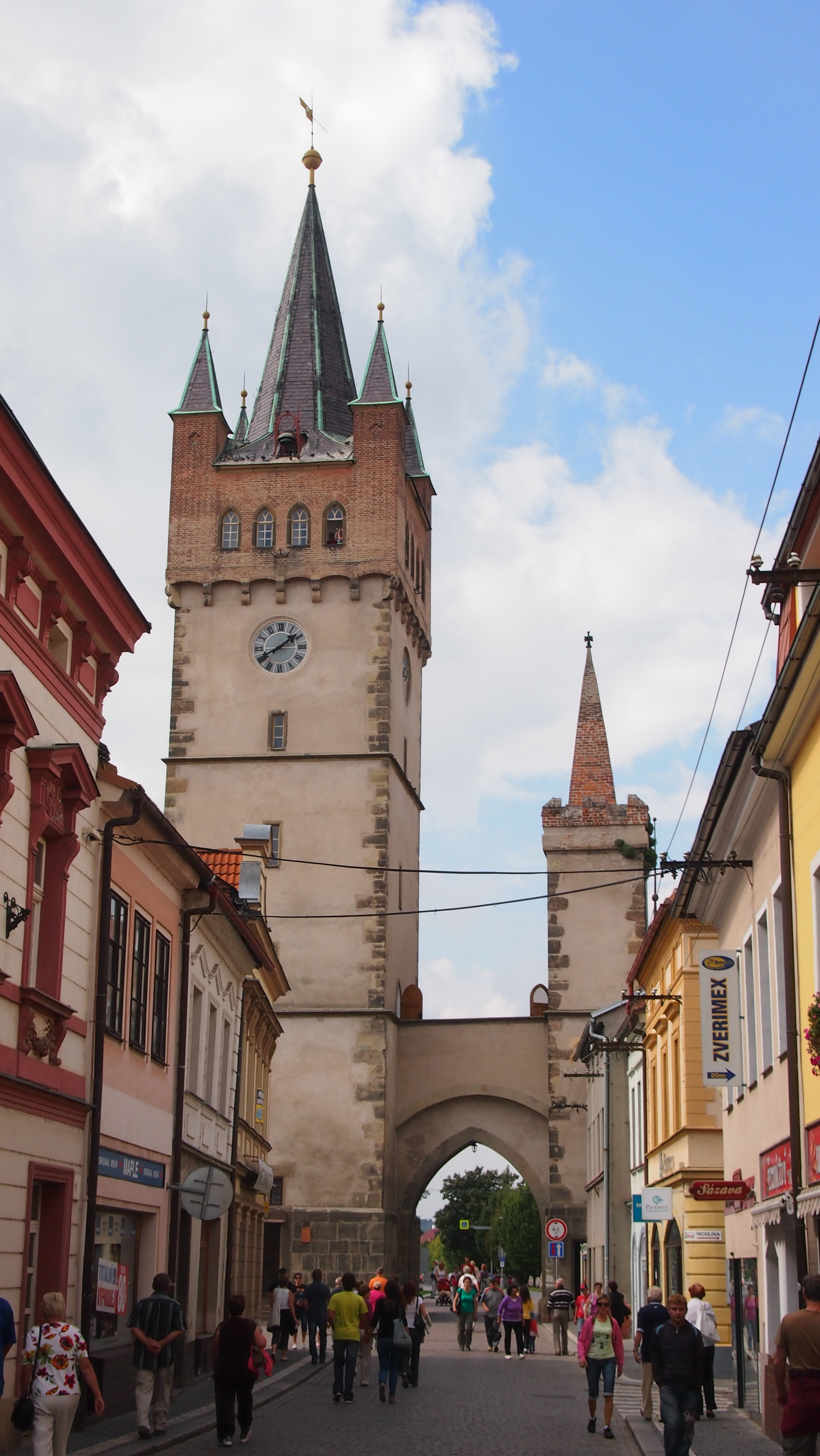
Prague Gate

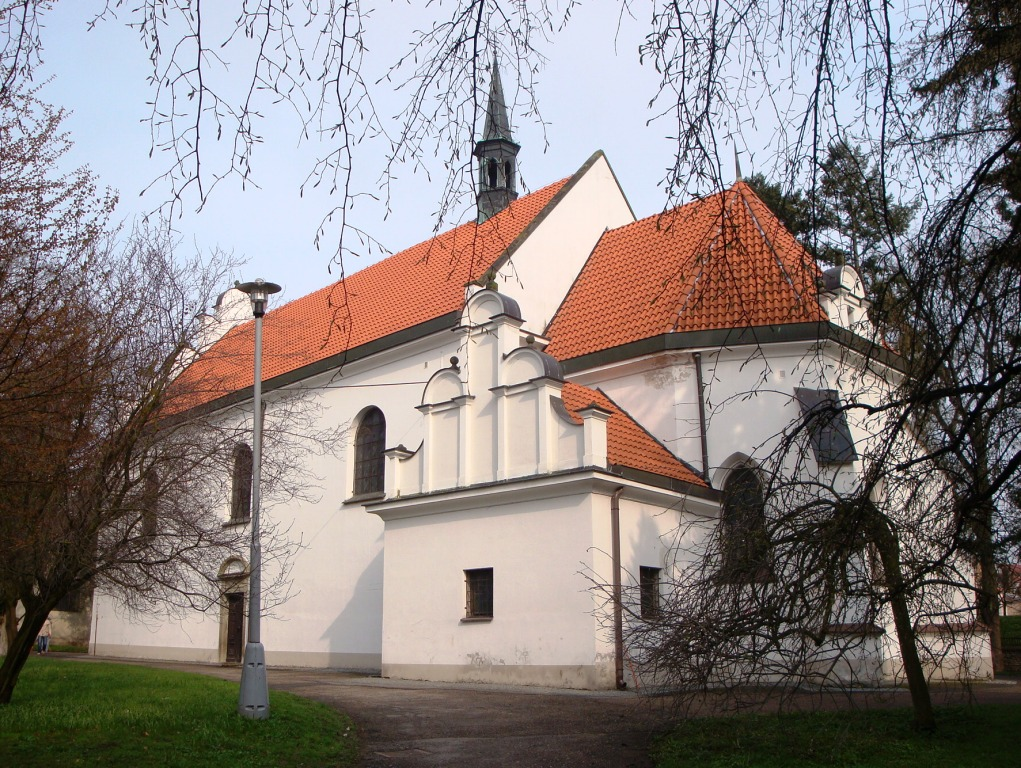
Church of the Holy Trinity

The first written mention of Vysoké Mýto is from 1265. It was founded shortly before this year by King Ottokar II as one of the trading centres on the trade route from Bohemia to Moravia, and was inhabited by German settlers. The town square and the network of streets were built in a regular shape, which is preserved to this day. Stone walls with three gates were gradually built around the whole town.

In the early 14th century, Vysoké Mýto became a dowry town administered by Elizabeth Richeza of Poland. Thanks to its location on a busy mercantile road, it soon became rich. During the Hussite Wars, the town was occupied several times. Most of the German population left the town and Czech citizens became the majority. After the wars, it became royal town of King Sigismund, who donated it to his wife Barbara of Cilli and it became again a dowry town.

Vysoké Mýto was devastated by fires between 1461 and 1517. Thanks to its wealth, the town recovered and new buildings were building, including stone houses on the square, the new town hall, and the Church of the Holy Trinity. In the 16th century, the town prospered and crafts developed. Cloth and knives were exported abroad. The prosperity ended with the Thirty Years' War and several fires in the 18th century.

During the 19th century, new development occurred, and the town became a cultural centre. A Czech-language theatre was established in 1825, the first public library in the region was established in 1839, and the town museum was founded in 1871. At the end of the 19th century, Vysoké Mýto was industrialised and two big engineering and machine-building companies were founded.

Until 1918, Vysoké Mýto was part of Austria-Hungary, head of the district of the same name, one of the 94 Bezirkshauptmannschaften in Bohemia.

== Demographics ==
Historical population

Year	Pop.	±%
1869	7,170	—
1880	8,337	+16.3%
1890	9,033	+8.3%
1900	10,643	+17.8%
1910	12,026	+13.0%

Year	Pop.	±%
1921	11,810	−1.8%
1930	11,947	+1.2%
1950	10,328	−13.6%
1961	9,827	−4.9%
1970	9,716	−1.1%

Year	Pop.	±%
1980	11,152	+14.8%
1991	10,987	−1.5%
2001	12,279	+11.8%
2011	12,428	+1.2%
2021	12,069	−2.9%

Source: Censuses

== Economy ==
The most important employer in the town is Iveco Czech Republic and its Iveco Bus factory (previously Karosa), which produces buses under the brands Irisbus Crossway, Irisbus Arway and Iveco Urbanway. With more than 3,000 employees, Iveco Czech Republic is the largest industrial company in the Pardubice Region.

== Transport ==
The I/35 road (part of the European route E442), which replaces the unfinished section of the D35 motorway from Olomouc to the Hradec Králové Region, runs through the town.

Vysoké Mýto lies on a railway line heading from Litomyšl to Choceň.

== Sport ==
The town's football club is SK Vysoké Mýto. It plays in lower amateur tiers.

== Sights ==
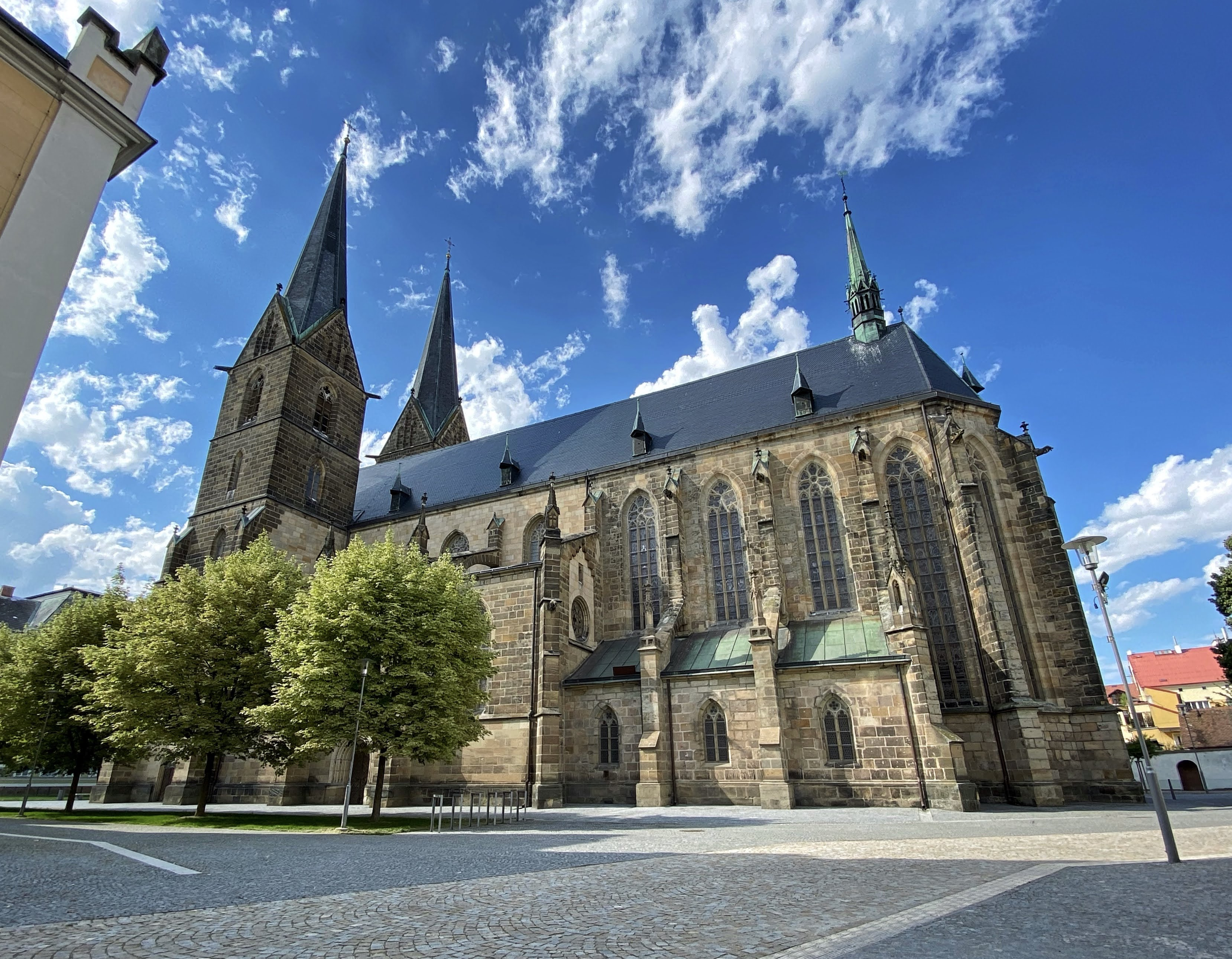
Church of Saint Lawrence

The quadrangle square named Přemysla Otakara II. Square is the largest square of its type in the Czech Republic. The Old Town Hall from 1433 is one of the oldest stone buildings in the town. It was rebuilt several times, last in 1828 in the Empire style. Today it houses the tourist information centre, the Town Art Gallery and an exposition on the manufacture of car bodies. In the middle of the square is a Baroque Marian column from 1714.

The Church of Saint Lawrence is a large cathedral from the second half of the 13th century. It was reconstructed after the fire in the 16th century, and the near Renaissance belfry was erected in 1585. The current appearance of the church is result of purist restoration from the late 19th century. Nowadays the premises of the belfry are used by the Town Art Gallery.

The Church of the Holy Trinity was built in the Renaissance style with Gothic elements in 1543.

Most of the town fortifications from the 14th century were demolished in the 18th century. Some fragments are preserved to this day, including the Prague Gate and Litomyšl Gate. The tower of the Prague Gate is open to the public as a lookout tower.

The Vysoké Mýto Regional Museum, which was founded in 1871, is the oldest town museum in the country.

== Notable people ==
- Bedřich Bridel (1619–1680), writer, poet and missionary
- Dismas Hataš (1724–1777), violinist and composer
- Alois Vojtěch Šembera (1807–1882), linguist and literary historian
- Josef Jireček (1825–1888), scholar
- Hermenegild Jireček (1827–1909), jurist and historian
- Hermann Škorpil (1858–1923), Czech-Bulgarian archaeologist and museum worker
- Karel Škorpil (1859–1944), Czech-Bulgarian archaeologist and museum worker
- František Ventura (1894–1969), equestrian, Olympic winner
- Maria Tauberová (1911–2003), opera singer
- Ladislav Trpkoš (1915–2004), basketball player
- Zdeněk Mlynář (1930–1997), politologist and politician
- Marie Málková (born 1941), actress
- Josef Krečmer (born 1958), violoncellist
- Luboš Kubík (born 1964), football player and coach
- Jan Jiraský (born 1973), pianist and pedagogue
- Lukáš Horníček (born 2002), footballer

== Twin towns – sister cities ==
Vysoké Mýto is twinned with:

- Dolni Chiflik, Bulgaria
- Korbach, Germany
- Odessos District (Varna), Bulgaria
- Ozorków, Poland
- Pyrzyce, Poland
- Spišská Belá, Slovakia
