= Jan Jiraský =

Czech pianist and pedagogue (born 1973)

Jan Jiraský (born 1973 Vysoké Mýto) is a Czech pianist and pedagogue. He studied the piano playing at the Janáček Academy of Music and Performing Arts in Brno with Alena Vlasáková.

He fulfilled his studies with obtaining doctor diploma for his comprehensive study on the Leoš Janáček Piano Works. Along with publishing of the book he recorded that repertoire on CD using both modern and authentic Janáček's own Ehrbar piano (at the Janáček Museum). He was awarded by several prizes for that act, including Janáček Premium Award.

He received numerous prizes at the piano competitions and as a performer he made himself famous by playing whole cycles of piano music, including complete Bach's Well-Tempered Clavier, Mozart's piano sonatas and pieces by Czech composers. He was also twice awarded by the prestigious Classic prize. As a pianist he believes a lot in importance of musicological research often using original autographs while studying new composition. He performs worldwide regularly and also devote himself to teaching.

In 2007 he was named the headmaster of the Piano Department of the Janáček Academy of Music as the youngest person ever achieving that status.
