= Jirák =

Jirák (feminine: Jiráková) is a Czech surname derived from the given name Jiří. A diminutive form of the surname is Jiráček. Notable people with the surname include:

- Karel Boleslav Jirák (1891–1972), Czech composer and conductor
- Ota Jirák (1949–2026), Czech actor, voice actor and comedian
