= Hromádka =

Hromádka is a Czech surname. Notable people with the surname include:

- Eduard Hromádka (1909–1966), Czech alpine skier
- Josef Hromádka (1889–1969), Czech Protestant theologian
- Karel Hromádka (1887–1956), Czech chess player
