= Josef Jireček =

Czech scholar, ethnographer, linguist and literature historian (1825–1888)

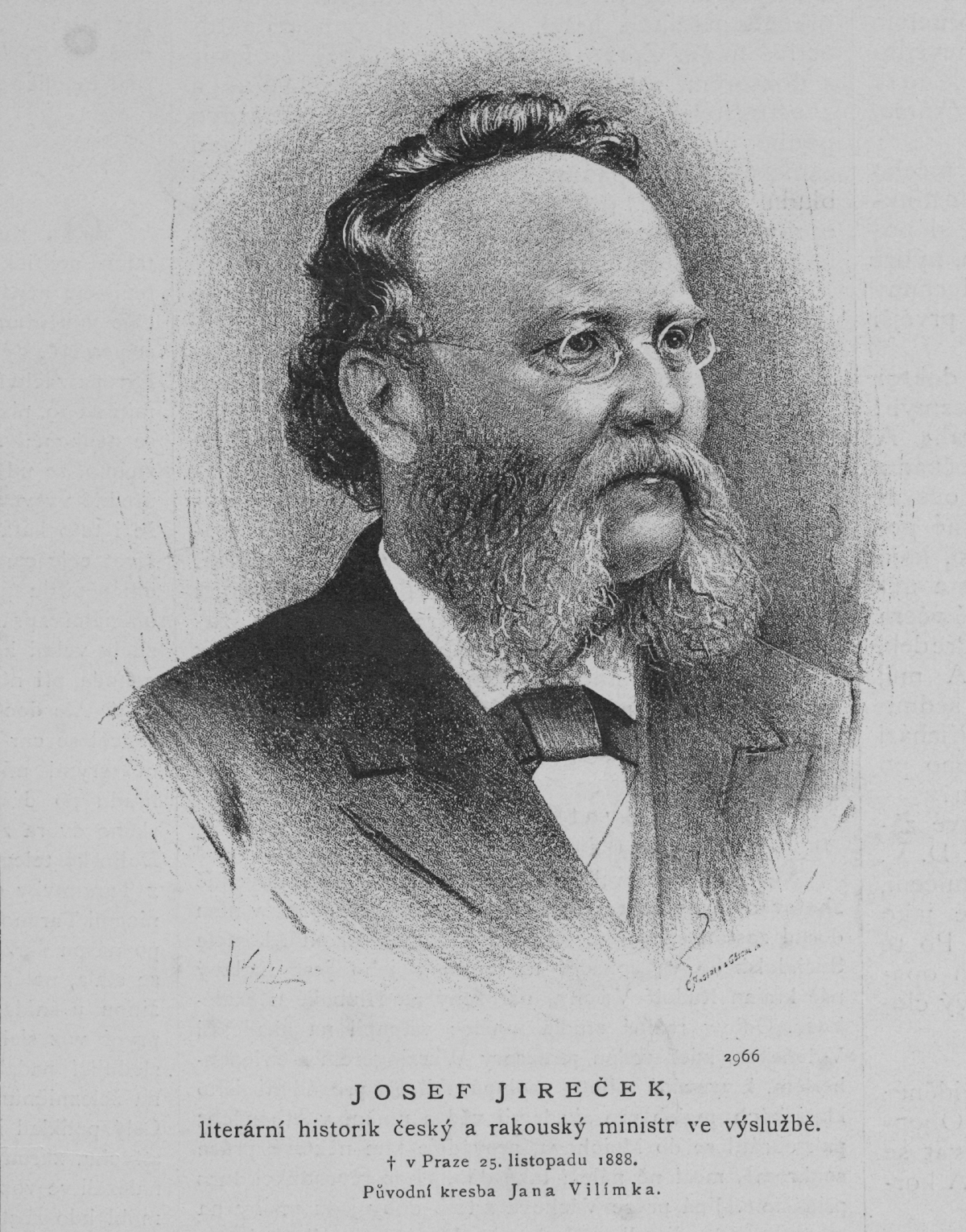
Josef Jireček (1888)

Josef Jireček (9 October 1825, in Vysoké Mýto – 25 November 1888, in Prague) was a Czech scholar. He was born in Vysoké Mýto (then part of the Austrian Empire). He entered the Prague Bureau of Education in 1850 and became department minister in the Hohenwart cabinet in 1871. His efforts to secure equal educational privileges for the Slav nationalities in the Austrian dominions brought him into disfavour with the German element. He became a member of the Bohemian Landtag in 1878 and of the Austrian Reichsrat in 1879. His merits as a scholar were recognized in 1875 by his election as president of the Royal Czech Society of Sciences. He died in Prague on 25 November 1888.

In 1862, he and his brother Hermenegild Jireček strove to defend the genuineness of the Königinhof Manuscript discovered by Václav Hanka. He published in Czech an anthology of Czech literature (3 volumes, 1858–1861), a biographical dictionary of Czech writers (2 volumes, 1875–1876), a Czech hymnology, editions of Jan Blahoslav's Czech grammar and some Czech classics, and of the works of his father-in-law Pavel Jozef Šafařík (1795–1861).

His son was the Slavic specialist Konstantin Josef Jireček, and his brother was the historian Hermenegild Jireček.
