= Hanková =

Municipality of Slovakia

Hanková Annafalva
- Municipality
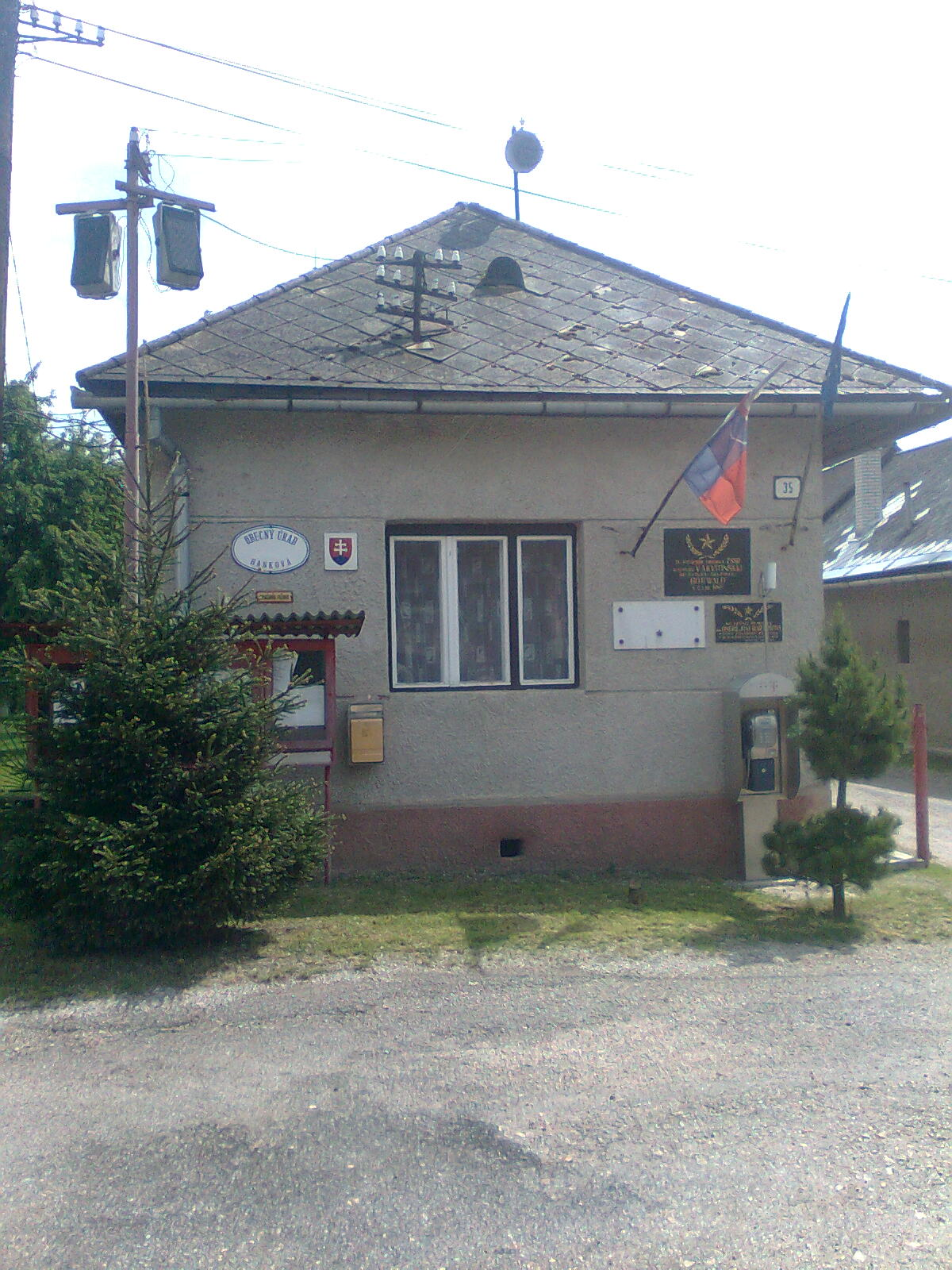

- Flag

- Location of Hanková in the Košice Region Location of Hanková in Slovakia
- Coordinates: 48.75°N 20.32°E
- Country: Slovakia
- Region: Košice Region
- District: Rožňava District
- First mentioned: 1556

Area
  - Total: 10.87 km^{2} (4.20 sq mi)
- Elevation: 489 m (1,604 ft)

Population (2025)
  - Total: 81
- Time zone: UTC+1 (CET)
  - Summer (DST): UTC+2 (CEST)
- Postal code: 493 4
- Area code: +421 58
- Vehicle registration plate (until 2022): RV
- Website: www.hankova.sk

Hanková (Hungarian: Annafalva, German: Hankendorf) is a village and municipality in the Rožňava District in the Košice Region of middle-eastern Slovakia.

== History ==
In historical records the village was first mentioned in 1556. It was founded under Vlach law. Before the establishment of independent Czechoslovakia in 1918, Hanková was part of Gömör and Kishont County within the Kingdom of Hungary. From 1939 to 1945, it was part of the Slovak Republic.

== Geography ==
The municipality lies at an altitude of 489 metres (1,604 ft) and covers an area of 10.87 km^{2} (4.20 sq mi) (2025).

== Population ==
Population statistic (10 years)
Year	1995	2005	2015	2025
Count	72	52	88	81
Difference		−27.77%	+69.23%	−7.95%

Population statistic
Year	2024	2025
Count	78	81
Difference		+3.84%

It has a population of 81 people (31 December 2025).

=== Ethnicity ===
Census 2021 (1+ %)
Ethnicity	Number	Fraction
Slovak	74	89.15%
Not found out	6	7.22%
Hungarian	3	3.61%
Romani	1	1.2%
Other	1	1.2%
Total	83	

In year 2021 was 83 people by ethnicity 74 as Slovak, 6 as Not found out, 3 as Hungarian, 1 as Romani and 1 as Other.

Note on population: The difference values of population numbers in the table "Population statistic" and in the sections "Ethnicity" & "Religion" is caused by the use of various statistical methods.

=== Religion ===
Census 2021 (1+ %)
Religion	Number	Fraction
None	52	62.65%
Evangelical Church	19	22.89%
Not found out	6	7.23%
Roman Catholic Church	4	4.82%
Calvinist Church	1	1.2%
Other	1	1.2%
Total	83	

In year 2021 was 83 people by religion 52 from None, 19 from Evangelical Church, 6 from Not found out, 4 from Roman Catholic Church, 1 from Calvinist Church and 1 from Other.

== Culture ==
The village has a public library and a football pitch.

== Genealogical resources ==
The records for genealogical research are available at the state archive "Statny Archiv in Kosice, Slovakia"

- Lutheran church records (births/marriages/deaths): 1706-1949 (parish B)

== See also ==
- List of municipalities and towns in Slovakia
