= Jik-e Sofla =

Jik-e Sofla جيك سفلي
- Village
- Location within Iran
- Coordinates: 32°18′32″N 59°30′02″E
- Country: Iran
- Province: South Khorasan
- County: Sarbisheh
- Bakhsh: Mud
- Rural District: Naharjan

Population (2006)
  - Total: 70
- Time zone: UTC+3:30 (IRST)
  - Summer (DST): UTC+4:30 (IRDT)

Jik-e Sofla (Persian: جيك سفلي, also Romanized as Jīk-e Soflá and Jīg-e Soflá; also known as Jīk, Jirag, Jīrak, and Jirg) is a village in Naharjan Rural District, Mud District, Sarbisheh County, South Khorasan Province, Iran. In the 2006 census, its population was 70 people across 21 families.
