= Stamic Quartet =

The Stamic Quartet (Czech: Stamicovo kvarteto) is a Czech string quartet. The ensemble is named after the composer Jan Václav Antonín Stamic, because both violinists of the original line-up were born in the same town as him, in the East Bohemian town of Havlíčkův Brod. The Stamic Quartet was founded in 1985. The ensemble focuses on performing compositions of Czech classical and foreign composers from classicism to modern music. In recent times they have also concentrated on other works of chamber music in cooperation with other musicians. The quartet has won international awards, including two Grand Prix du Disque for recordings of complete quartets by Antonín Dvořák and Bohuslav Martinů.

== Links ==
- Stamic Quartet official webpage
