= Václav Čermák =

Czech Slavist (born 1974)

- Born: 1974 (age 51–52)
- Education: Palacký University Olomouc; Charles University
- Known for: Research on medieval Glagolitic manuscripts
- Scientific career
- Fields: Slavic studies, Old Church Slavonic philology, textual criticism
- Workplaces: Institute of Slavonic Studies of the Czech Academy of Sciences; Charles University

Václav Čermák (born 1974) is a Czech Slavist and philologist specialising in Old Church Slavonic literature, textual criticism and the medieval Glagolitic manuscript tradition. He has directed the Institute of Slavonic Studies of the Czech Academy of Sciences since 2017 and became chair of the International Committee of Slavists in August 2025.

His research has focused particularly on Glagolitic writing in medieval Bohemia and its connections with Croatian manuscript culture. His monograph Hlaholské písemnictví v Čechách doby lucemburské (2020) examines Glagolitic literary production under the House of Luxembourg and includes editions of medieval manuscript fragments. The book received reviews in several scholarly journals.

== Education and academic career ==
Čermák completed a master's degree in Czech and Latin at Palacký University Olomouc in 1997. He received a Ph.D. in Slavic philology from Charles University in Prague in 2002. The linguist Radoslav Večerka included him in his 2008 biographical and bibliographical survey of Czech linguists.

He has worked in the institute's Department of Palaeoslavic and Byzantine Studies since 1999 and headed the department from 2003 to 2012. Between 2008 and 2017, he was an odborný asistent (university teaching and research staff member) at the Faculty of Arts, Charles University. He became director of the Institute of Slavonic Studies in 2017.

== Research ==
Čermák's research interests include Old Church Slavonic lexicography and textual studies, Slavic manuscript transmission in the Czech lands under the Přemyslids and Luxembourgs, Croatian Glagolitic literature, and the history of Czech scholarship on early Slavic texts.

His 2020 monograph, whose title may be translated as Glagolitic Literature in Bohemia during the Luxembourg Period, examines the Glagolitic literary tradition in fourteenth- and fifteenth-century Bohemia, including Church Slavonic and Old Czech material. Particular attention is given to the Emmaus Monastery (Na Slovanech) in Prague and to literary contacts with Croatia. Alongside the historical-philological study, Čermák edited approximately thirty Church Slavonic Glagolitic manuscript fragments of the Croatian recension preserved in Czech and Moravian collections. Not all of the fragments can be linked to the monastery.

In a detailed review in the Croatian journal Slovo, Martina Kramarić highlighted the publication of previously unedited Glagolitic material and assessed the work as a substantial contribution to Palaeoslavic studies and Czech and Croatian philology. The monograph was also reviewed by Bohumil Vykypěl in Opera Slavica (2022), Julia Verkholantsev in Česká literatura (2023), and Dana Zapletalová in Slavia (2024).

Čermák was one of seven contributors to the first volume of Řecko-staroslověnský index (Index verborum graeco-palaeoslovenicus, 2014). He also contributed to a collective catalogue of manuscript fragments in the National Museum library (2016). His research on biblical manuscript transmission includes a study of the Old Testament readings in the Glagolitic section of the Reims Gospel (2016).

== Scholarly organisations and editorial work ==
Čermák has chaired the Czech Committee of Slavists since 2012 and has been a member of the International Committee of Slavists since 2013. Since 2018, he has chaired the committee's Commission for Church Slavonic Dictionaries, succeeding Zdenka Ribarova. He has also served on the committee's Biblical Commission and on the boards of several Czech scholarly organisations.

He was elected chair of the International Committee of Slavists at its meeting in Paris on 28 August 2025. The committee announced that the next regular International Congress of Slavists would be held in Prague in 2029, the centenary year of the first congress.

Čermák is editor-in-chief of Slavia, a peer-reviewed journal of Slavic philology founded in 1922. He has also served on the editorial boards of Slavica Slovaca and the Zagreb journal Slovo.

== Selected publications ==
=== Monograph ===
- Čermák, Václav (2020). Hlaholské písemnictví v Čechách doby lucemburské (in Czech). Prague: Slovanský ústav AV ČR. ISBN 978-80-86420-75-2.

=== Articles ===
- Čermák, Václav (2005). "Emauzský hlaholský nápis – příspěvek k hlaholské epigrafice". Slavia (in Czech). 74: 343–358.
- Čermák, Václav (2016). "Starozákonní lekce v hlaholské části Remešského evangeliáře. Příspěvek k církevněslovanskému písemnictví středověkých Čech". Slavia (in Czech). 85: 303–320.

=== Collaborative and edited volumes ===
- Bláhová, Emilie; Čermák, Václav; Chromá, Martina; Pilát, Štefan; Ribarova, Zdenka; Spurná, Kateřina; Vařeková, Jarmila (2014). Řecko-staroslověnský index = Index verborum graeco-palaeoslovenicus. Tomus I: Prolegomena. Tabellae synopticae monumentorum slavicorum. A–G (in Czech). Prague: Slovanský ústav AV ČR. ISBN 978-80-86420-33-2.
- Šlaufová, Eva; Skwarska, Karolína; Čermák, Václav, eds. (2020). Proměny české slavistiky po roce 1989 (in Czech). Prague: Slovanský ústav AV ČR. ISBN 978-80-86420-68-4.
