= Emmaus Monastery =

Abbey in Prague

Coordinates: 50°04′20″N 14°25′03″E

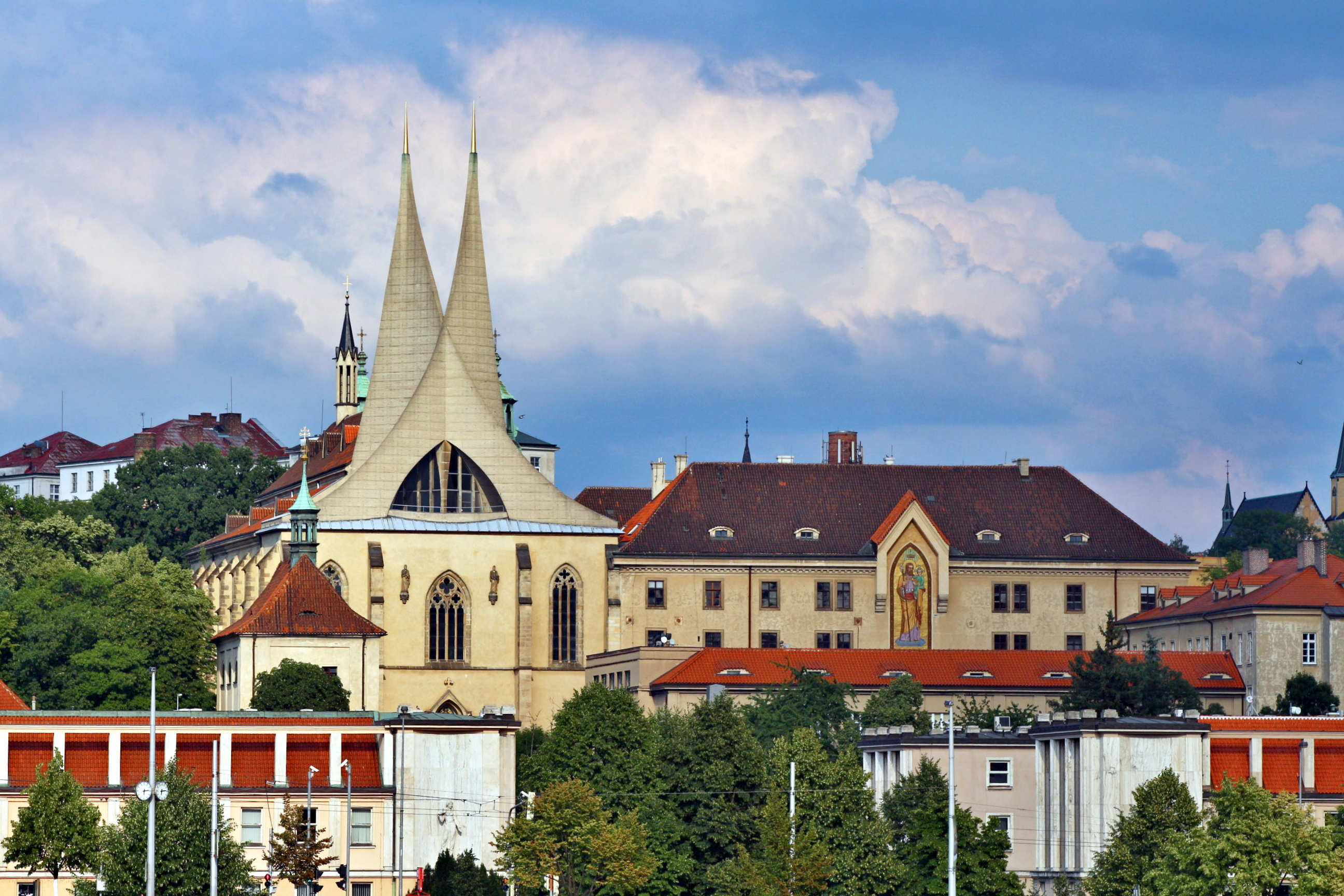
Emmaus monastery

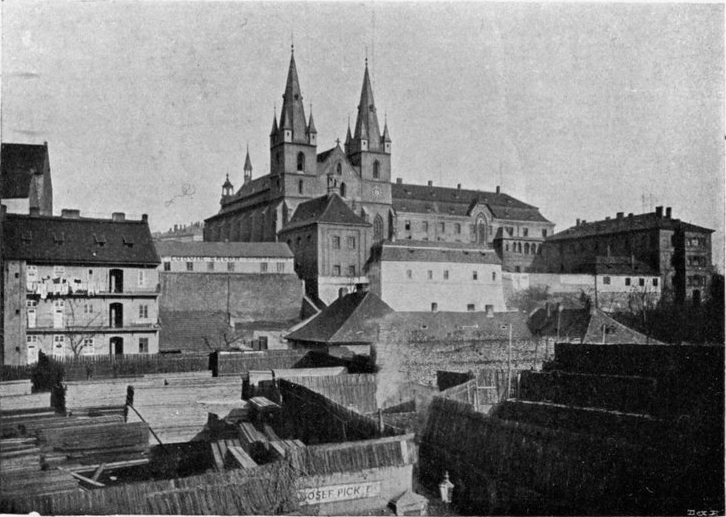
Monastery at the end of the 19th century

The Emmaus Monastery (Czech: Emauzy or Emauzský klášter), called Na Slovanech in the Middle Ages, is a Benedictine abbey established in 1347 in Prague.

In the 1360s, the cloisters of the Monastery were decorated with a cycle of 85 Gothic wall paintings with parallels from the Old and New Testaments. The Gothic cloisters also feature original faded frescoes with bits of Pagan symbolism from the 14th century. The monastery was baroquised in the 17th–18th centuries and the two church towers were added.

Charles IV, Holy Roman Emperor gave to the just-founded monastery the manuscript Reims Gospel, it was probably lost from Prague in the time of the Hussite Wars, the manuscript later became part of the Reims Cathedral treasury. The monastery became a center of culture and art, students of Saints Cyril and Methodius studied there in addition to Jan Hus.

During the Second World War the monastery was seized by the Gestapo and the monks were sent to Dachau concentration camp. The monastery building and vaults were destroyed by a U.S. bombing raid on Prague on 14 February 1945. The modern roof with steeples was added in the 1960s. Returned to the Benedictine order in 1990, the monastery is administered by three monks, two of whom live there.

== Gallery ==
The Krtíš fragment of the Emmaus Glagolitic Comestor
