= Ján Kollár =

Slovak author writing in Czech (1793–1852)

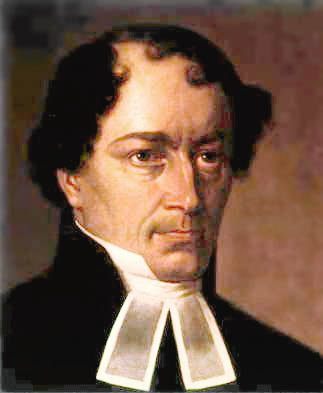
- Born: 29 July 1793; Mosóc, Kingdom of Hungary (now Mošovce, Slovakia)
- Died: 24 January 1852 (aged 58); Vienna, Austrian Empire
- Occupations: Writer, poet, pastor
- Relatives: Matej Kollár (father); Katarína Frndová (mother)
- Writing career
- Notable work: Slávy dcera

Ján Kollár (Hungarian: Kollár János; 29 July 1793 – 24 January 1852) was a Slovak writer (mainly poet), archaeologist, scientist, Lutheran pastor, politician, and major proponent of Pan-Slavism.

== Life ==
He studied at the Lutheran Lyceum in Pressburg (Pozsony, Kingdom of Hungary, now Bratislava, Slovakia). In 1817 he enrolled in the University of Jena. His attendance at the Wartburgfest (18 October 1817) has since been credited as being a formative experience with regard to his views on Pan-Slavism.

He spent most of his adult life as a chaplain to the populous but poor Slovak Lutheran community in Pest (Kingdom of Hungary, today part of Budapest, Hungary). From 1849, he was a professor of Slavic archeology at the University of Vienna, and several times he also acted as a counselor to the Austrian government for issues around the Slovaks. He entered the Slovak national movement in its first phase.

His museum (since 1974) in Mošovce was installed in the former granary, which was the only masoned part of Kollár's otherwise wooden birth-house. The rest of the house burned down in a fire on 16 August 1863. In 2009 a replica was rebuilt of the original birth-house, which is now a museum.

== Works ==
Kollár primarily wrote both verse and prose in Czech, although two texts were originally written in German (A Word on the Magyarisation of the Slavs in Hungary, 1821, and Concerning Literary Reciprocity amongst the various Tribes and Dialects of the Slavic Nation, 1836), and he wrote occasionally in Slovak. His Básně Jana Kollára (Poems of Jan Kollár) was published in 1821 and would later form the core of Slávy dcera, which he was best known for.

Slávy dcera (The Daughter of Sláva) was published in 1824 as 151 sonnets in 3 cantos, and updated in 1832 as a collection of 615 sonnets in 5 cantos, integrating aspects of Petrarch's Il Canzoniere and Dante's Divine Comedy with Slav history and identity. This work made him famous, and was a major literary and ideological contribution to emerging Pan-Slavism. This new patriotic-erotic form of poetry became a model in Czech and Slovak literature. Literary assessments have stressed its originality and connection to Romantic nationalism. Within Czech and Slovak national movements, however, Pan-Slavism never overcame the individual nationalist movements, which tended to be skeptical of sacrificing language and identity to Russian leadership.

In the sonnets, the narrator's lover Mína and his land of Slavia are one and the same. Mína, the titular daughter of the goddess Sláva, embodies the ideals of Slav reciprocity, dissolving the individual aspects of Slav identity into a collective whole. It is divided into 5 chapters with a prelude. They feature trochaic meter, influenced by Josef Jungmann's translation of Paradise Lost and of other German poets, an Italian form based on two quatrains and two tercets, and alternation of feminine and masculine line endings, which canonized this kind of alteration in Slovak poetry.

In Předzpěv (Prelude), the narrator expresses his fears that the Slovaks will disappear from the face of Europe like other Slavic tribes before. He asked the Slovaks to ask for help from the Russian nation. In Canto I, Sála, Kollár glorifies his love Mína, depicting her as an ideal of a Slavic maid, the daughter of goddess Sláva. In Canto II, Labe, Rén, Vltava, the narrator takes us to places where Slavic tribes lived before. He is disappointed because these areas belong to foreign countries now. In Canto III, Dunaj, the narrator arrives to Slovakia, disillusioned by the poverty of this area. He is highly disappointed and longs for death. In Canto IV, Léthé, the goddess Sláva welcomes Mína and she meets famous people of Slavic history. In Canto V, Acheron, Mína becomes a fairy and takes the author to Slavic heaven and hell.

== Legacy ==
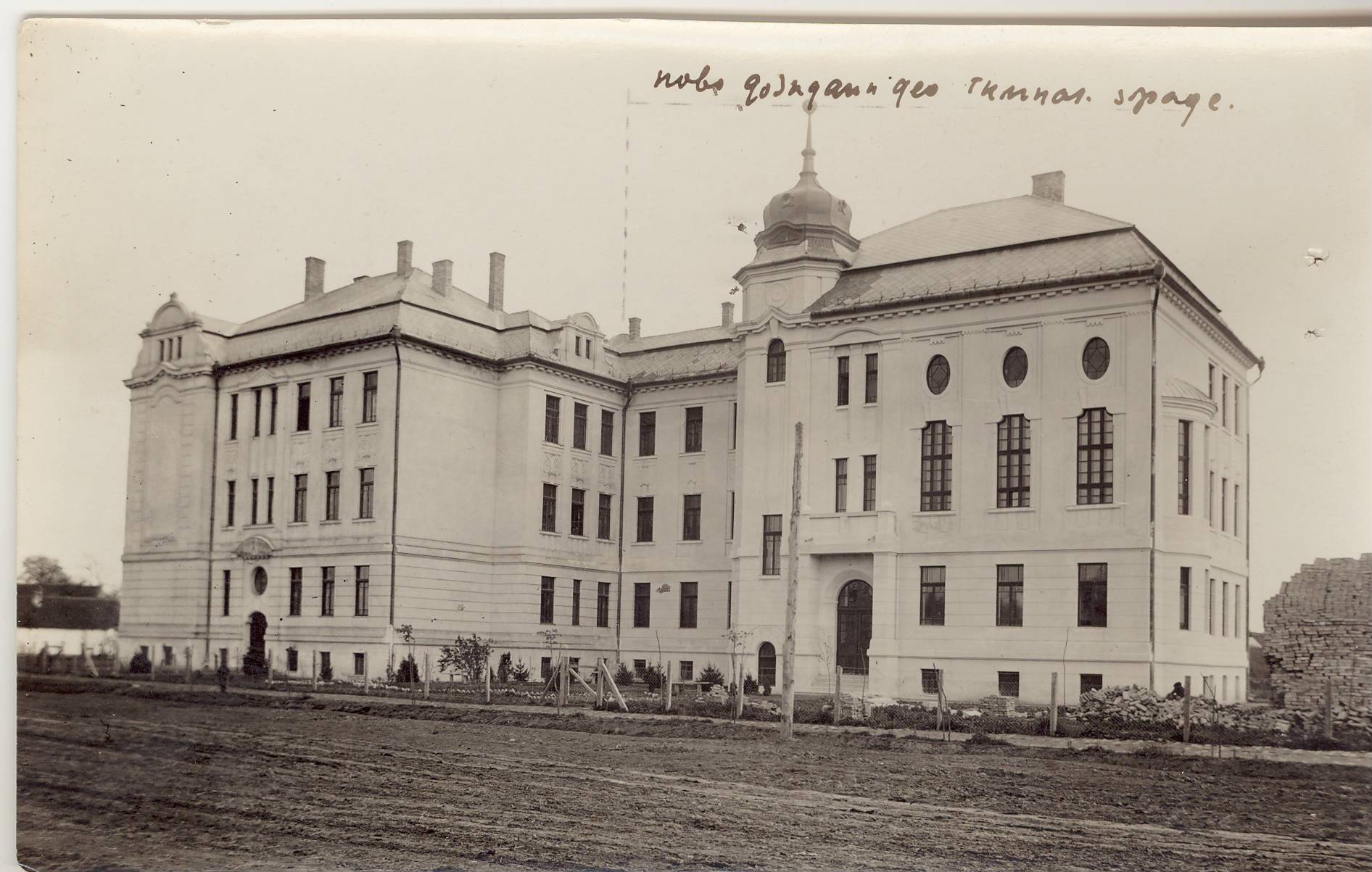
Ján Kollár Gymnasium and Students' Home in Bački Petrovac, first half of the 20th century

- Guta (Gúta) is a town in southern Slovakia with a Hungarian majority. It was renamed "Kolárovo" in 1948.
- Streets in Stara Pazova, Kisač, Padina and Belgrade in Serbia are named in his honor.
- The gymnasium in Bački Petrovac (Serbia) bears his name.

== Gallery ==
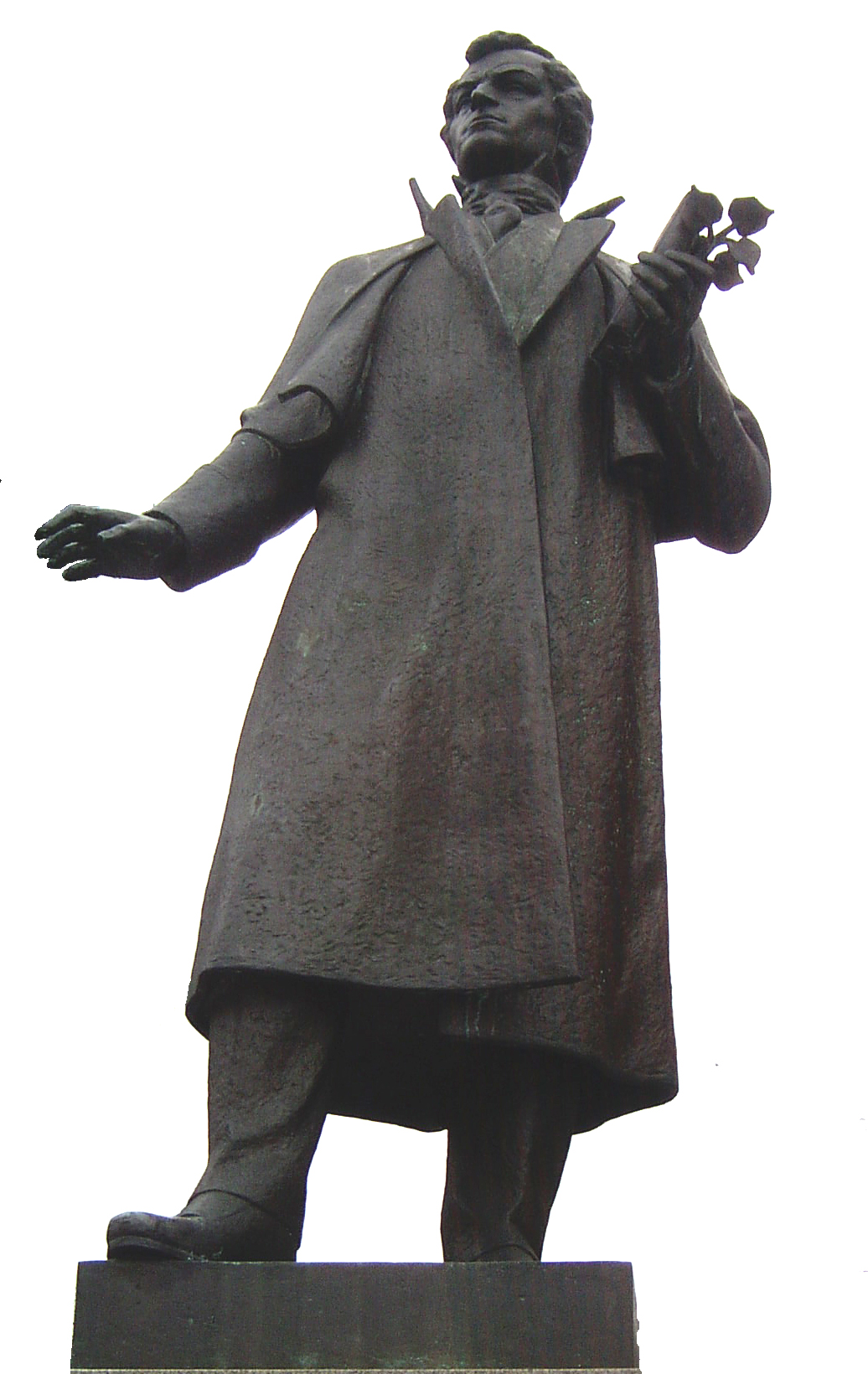
Statue of Ján Kollár in Mošovce

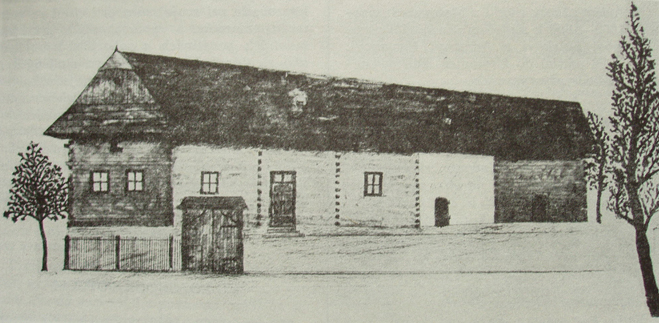
Birth-house of Ján Kollár in Mošovce

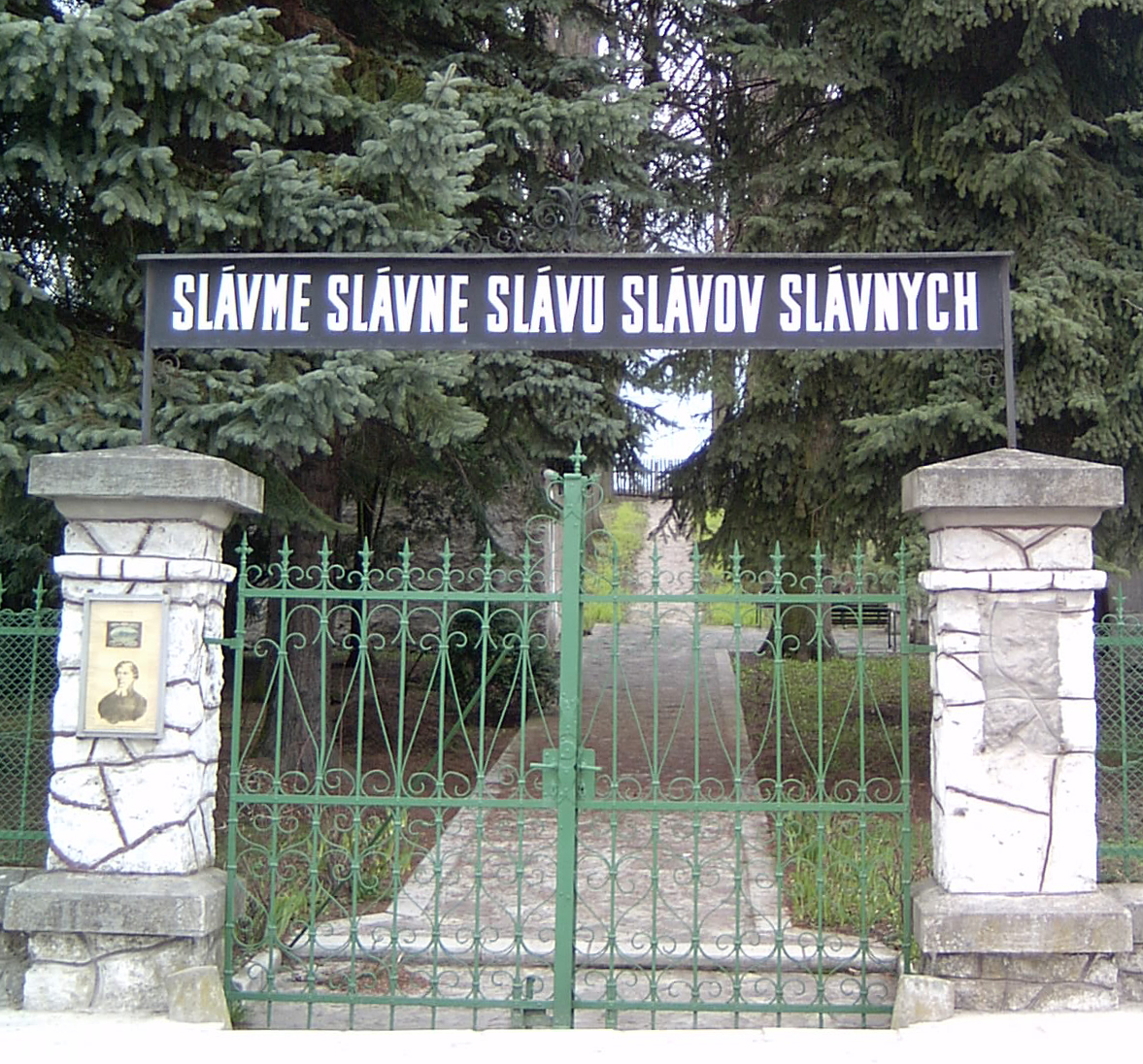
Motto

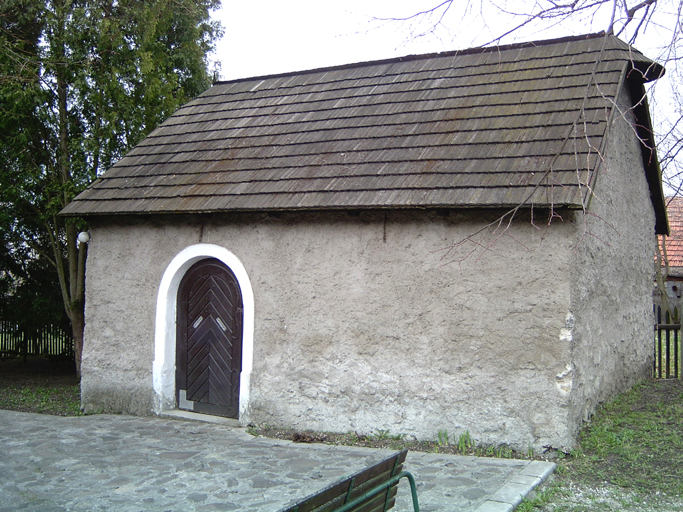
Museum of Ján Kollár in Mošovce
