= Museum of Vojvodina Slovaks =

- Музеј војвођанских Словака; Muzej vojvođanskih Slovaka; Múzeum vojvodinských Slovákov

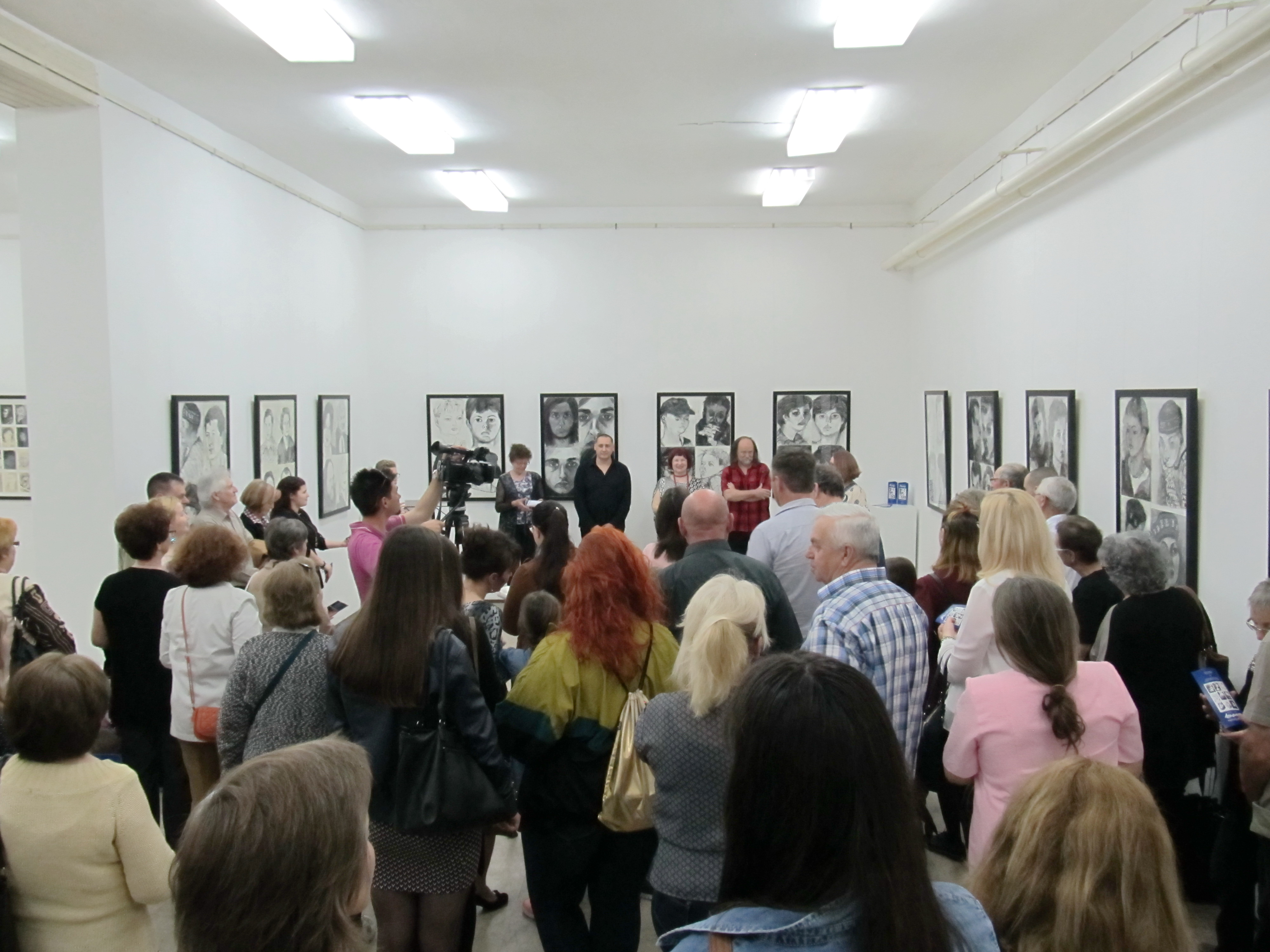
- Exhibition opening in 2018
- Established: 1949; 77 years ago (as the Museum of Bački Petrovac); 2012; 14 years ago (as the Museum of Vojvodina Slovaks)
- Location: Maršala Tita 23, 21470 Bački Petrovac, Vojvodina, Serbia
- Coordinates: 45.3613°N 19.5904°E
- Type: History museum
- Website: www.muzeumslovakov.rs

The Museum of Vojvodina Slovaks (Serbian: Музеј војвођанских Словака, Muzej vojvođanskih Slovaka; Slovak: Múzeum vojvodinských Slovákov) in Bački Petrovac in Serbian province of Vojvodina, is the central museum institution of the Slovaks in Serbia. Under its current name and with its contemporary mission the museum was established in 2012 as the direct successor of the Museum of Bački Petrovac. The museum's mission is to study, document, present, and preserve ethnological, historical, and artistic artifacts related to the Slovak community in Vojvodina.

The initiative to create a museum dedicated to the Slovak minority in the former Yugoslavia began in 1946, led by Matica slovenská during preparations for an exhibition at the Slovak National Festival. In 1949, the Slovak Museum in Yugoslavia officially opened in Bački Petrovac, showcasing artifacts such as traditional Slovak rooms and tools related to flax processing and brewing. Over the decades, the museum evolved to focus on cultural and historical collections, despite challenges during the 1990s. It reopened to the public in 2004.

== History ==
The National Museum in Bački Petrovac was founded in 1949 to preserve and promote the cultural heritage of Slovaks in Vojvodina. Initially comprising five departments—ethnographic, cultural-historical, archaeological-numismatic, natural history, and art—the museum has since focused on its ethnographic and cultural-historical collections. Highlights include traditional Slovak clothing, historical documents, and artifacts reflecting Slovak life in the region. The museum also collaborates with the Zuzka Medveđová Gallery established in 1989.

In April 2012, the Museum of Vojvodina Slovaks was established as an independent institution after over 60 years during which it was nominally a section of the Museum of Bački Petrovac, following an agreement between the Provincial Secretariat for Culture and Public Information and the Municipality of Bački Petrovac. On June 13, 2019, representatives of the Archives of Vojvodina met with the director of the Museum of Slovaks of Vojvodina to discuss collaboration.

== See also ==
- List of museums in Serbia
- Ján Kollár Gymnasium and Students' Home
