= Statue of Josef Jungmann =

Statue in Prague, Czech Republic

- Pomník Josefa Jungmanna (Czech)
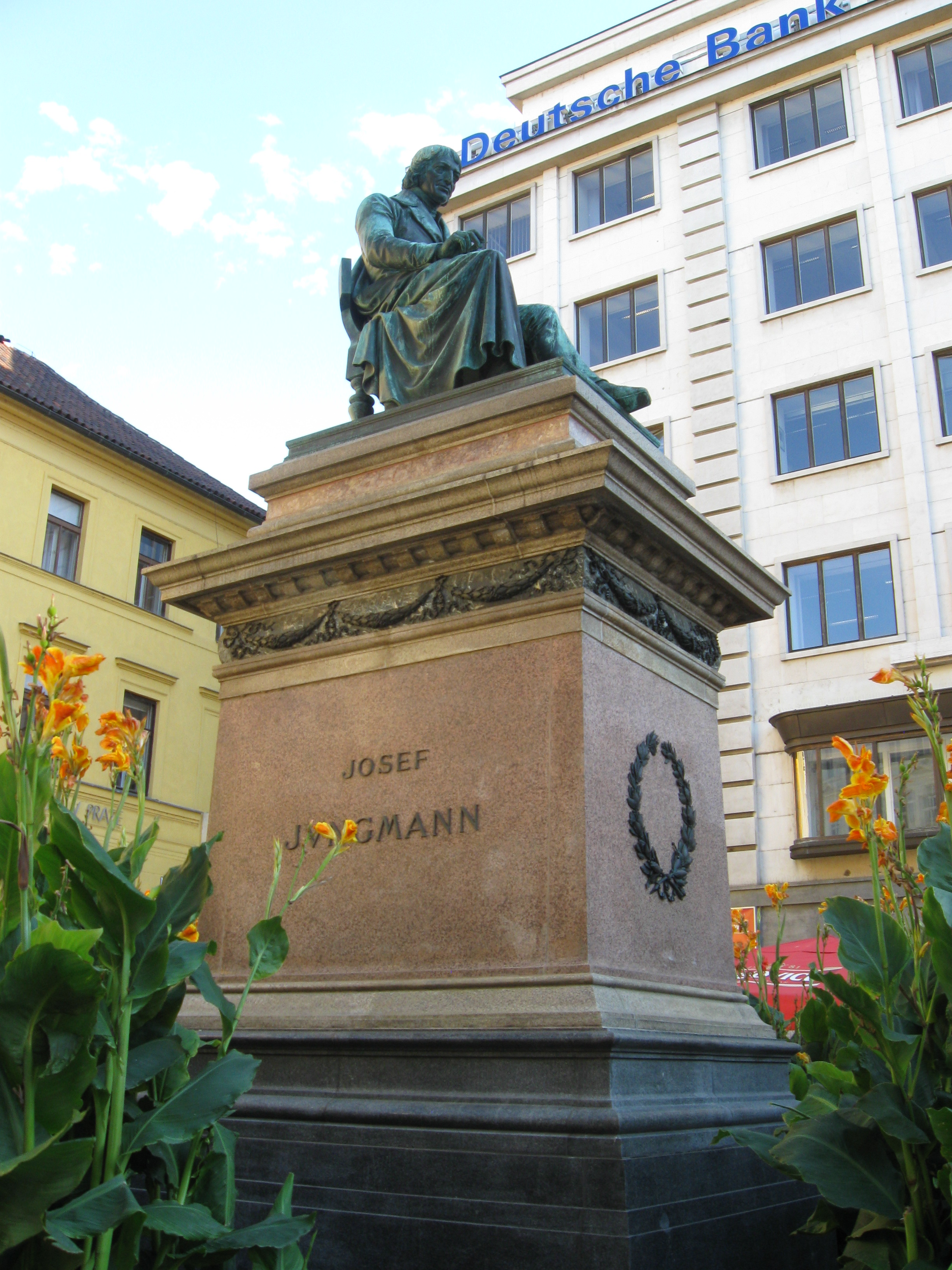
- The memorial in 2012
- Type: Sculpture
- Location: Prague, Czech Republic; 50°4′58.43″N 14°25′20.82″E

A statue of Josef Jungmann (Czech: Pomník Josefa Jungmanna) is installed in Prague, Czech Republic.

The construction of the monument was initiated by František Palacký and František Ladislav Rieger in 1866. They approached the sculptor Václav Levý, who was working in Rome at the time, and the architect Antonín Viktor Barvitius. Levý made a sketch and a small model of the statue, depicting Jungmann as a seated figure with a scroll and pen. Work on the monument was interrupted by Levy's illness and sudden death in 1870. The commission was then taken over by Ludvík Šimek, who used the original sketch and completed the statue, cast in Vienna, in 1872. The pedestal was made by Erhard Ackermann according to a design by Barvitius.The foundation stone for the monument was laid in 1873 by Palacký. The monument was unveiled in 1878.
