= Antonín Jan Jungmann =

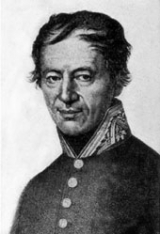
Antonín Jan Jungmann

Antonín Jan Jungmann (German: Anton Johann Ritter von Jungmann; 19 May 1775 – 10 April 1854) was a Czech obstetrician and educator. He was a younger brother to linguist Josef Jungmann (1773–1847).

== Life ==
Jungmann was born in Hudlice, Kingdom of Bohemia. In 1811, he was appointed professor of obstetrics to the medical faculty at Charles University in Prague, and in 1838 he became university rector. He gave lectures in German and Czech, and collaborated with his brother on the latter's linguistic projects. He remained at the University of Prague until his retirement in 1850.

Jungmann was a Czech pioneer of Sanskrit studies, being the author of O sanskrtu (On Sanskrit, 1821).

== Medical works ==
- Lehrbuch der Geburtshülfe, (1812) – Textbook of obstetrics.
- Das Technische der Geburtshülfe, zum Gebrauche bei Vorlesungen über Operationen, für Mediciner und Wundärzte, (1824) – Technical obstetrics, for use in lectures on surgery for medical students and surgeons.
- Uměnj porodnické, k užitku ženám při porodu obsluhugjcým, (1827).

Educational offices
| Preceded by Václav Vilém Václavíček | Rector of Charles University in Prague; 1839 | Succeeded by Josef Jungmann |
