= Hudlice =

- Municipality
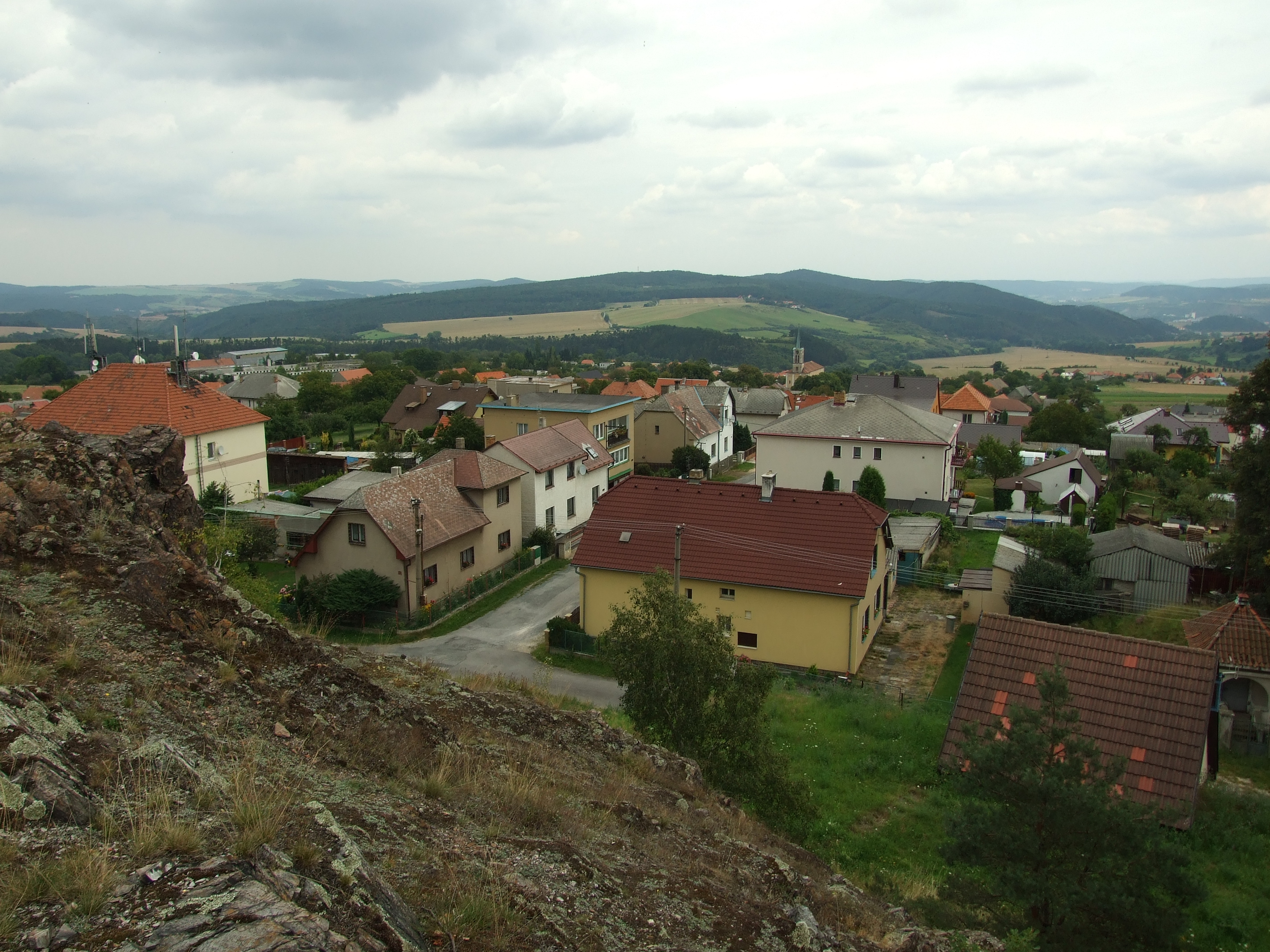
- General view of Hudlice

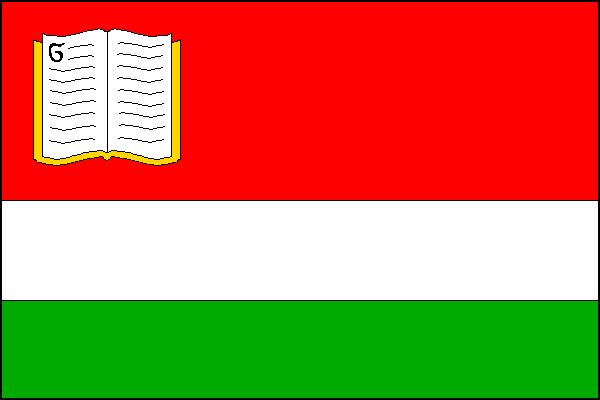
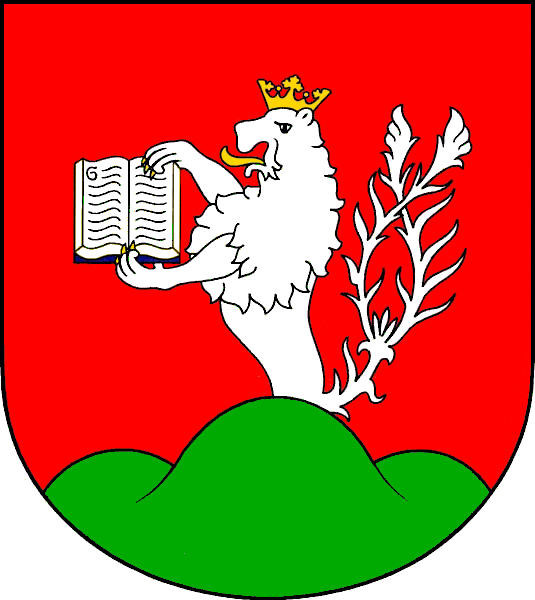
- Flag Coat of arms

- Location in the Czech Republic
- Coordinates: 49°57′40″N 13°58′15″E
- Country: Czech Republic
- Region: Central Bohemian
- District: Beroun
- First mentioned: 1341

Area
  - Total: 20.75 km^{2} (8.01 sq mi)
- Elevation: 401 m (1,316 ft)

Population (2026-01-01)
  - Total: 1,266
  - Density: 61.01/km^{2} (158.0/sq mi)
- Time zone: UTC+1 (CET)
  - Summer (DST): UTC+2 (CEST)
- Postal code: 267 03
- Website: www.obec-hudlice.cz

Hudlice is a municipality and village in Beroun District in the Central Bohemian Region of the Czech Republic. It has about 1,300 inhabitants. It is known as the birthplace of Josef Jungmann, who is considered to be one of the creators of the modern Czech language.

== Geography ==
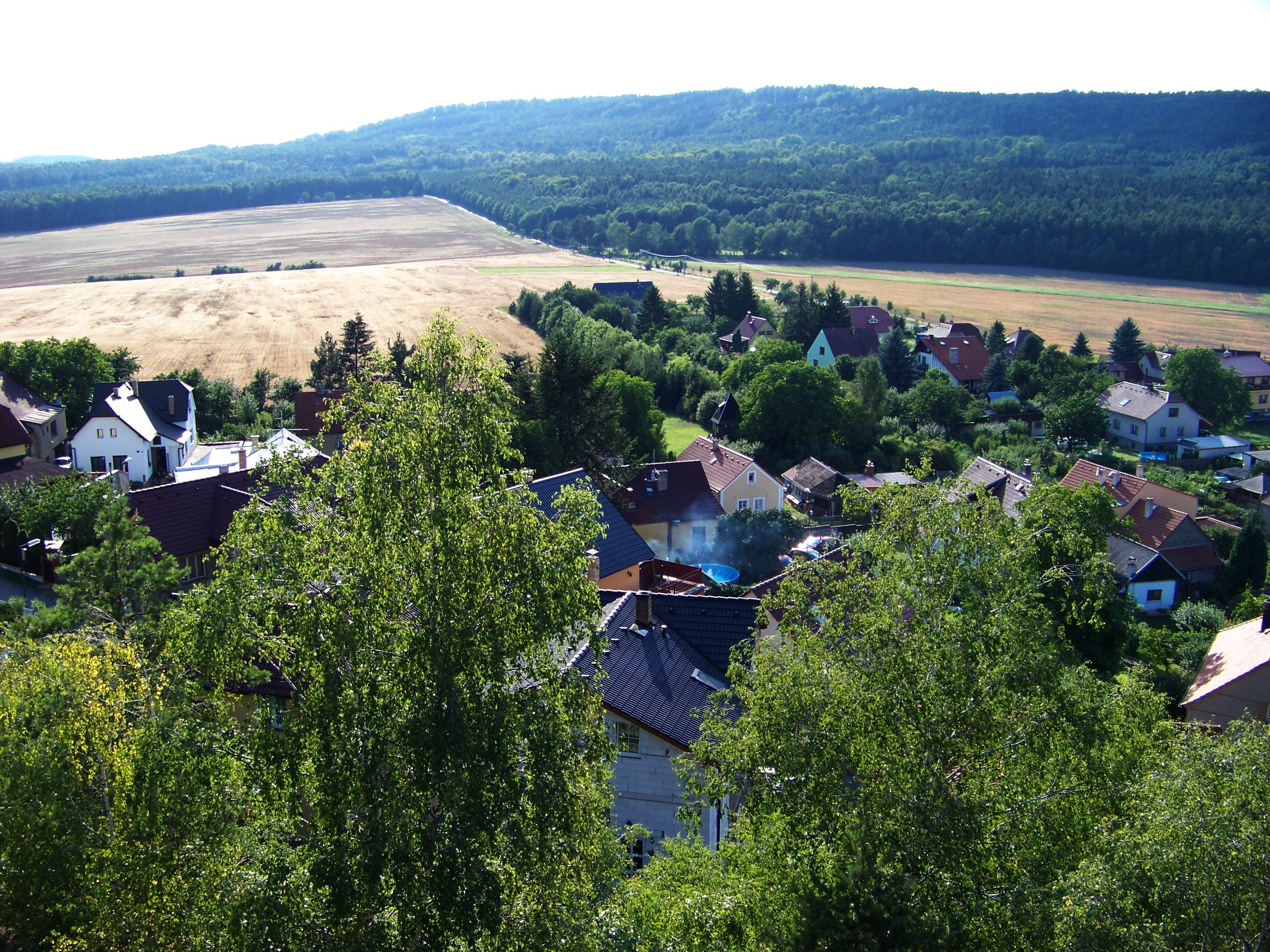
Krušná hora as viewed from the Hudlická skála Rock

Hudlice is located about 5 kilometres (3 mi) west of Beroun and 28 km (17 mi) west of Prague. It lies in the Křivoklát Highlands, in the Křivoklátsko Protected Landscape Area. The highest point is the hill Krušná hora at 609 m (1,998 ft) above sea level. Other significant peaks are the rocks Hudlická skála at 475 m (1,558 ft), an isolated cobblestone cliff, and Kozlí skála at 381 m (1,250 ft).

The main watercourse is the stream Dibeřský potok, which flows through the southern part of the municipal territory. The brook Libotický potok originates in the northern part of Hudlice, supplies three small fishponds and flows into the Dibeřský potok near the eastern municipal border. A nameless brook, which is a right tributary of the Libotický potok, flows through the built-up area.

== History ==
Wenceslaus Hajek writes in his chronicle the village was gifted by Duke Jaromír to his servant Hovora. This story is considered as a romantical fabulation. The first written mention of Hudlice is from 1341.

After Karlštejn Castle was founded in 1348, Hudlice was part of its estate. Later it transferred to the Křivoklát estate. From 1425 to 1437 there was a knight's court in Hudlice. The village changed its owners several times and its development was interrupted by the Hussite Wars and the Thirty Years' War.

It was not until around 1656 that the village flourished with the development of the ironworks. Iron ore and vermilion were mined and gold was panned in the streams. In the past, many miners mining iron ore lived here, the main source of which was the nearby mountain of Krušná hora until the 1960s. Charcoal was produced in the surrounding forests, which was used for iron furnaces.

== Demographics ==
Historical population

Year	Pop.	±%
1869	1,533	—
1880	1,525	−0.5%
1890	1,552	+1.8%
1900	1,686	+8.6%
1910	1,768	+4.9%

Year	Pop.	±%
1921	1,705	−3.6%
1930	1,851	+8.6%
1950	1,392	−24.8%
1961	1,389	−0.2%
1970	1,355	−2.4%

Year	Pop.	±%
1980	1,288	−4.9%
1991	1,167	−9.4%
2001	1,182	+1.3%
2011	1,254	+6.1%
2021	1,238	−1.3%

Source: Censuses

== Economy ==
A wastewater treatment plant is situated on the eastern outskirts of the village.

== Transport ==
There are no railways or major roads passing through the municipality. Hudlice is connected to Beroun by a public bus line.

== Sights ==
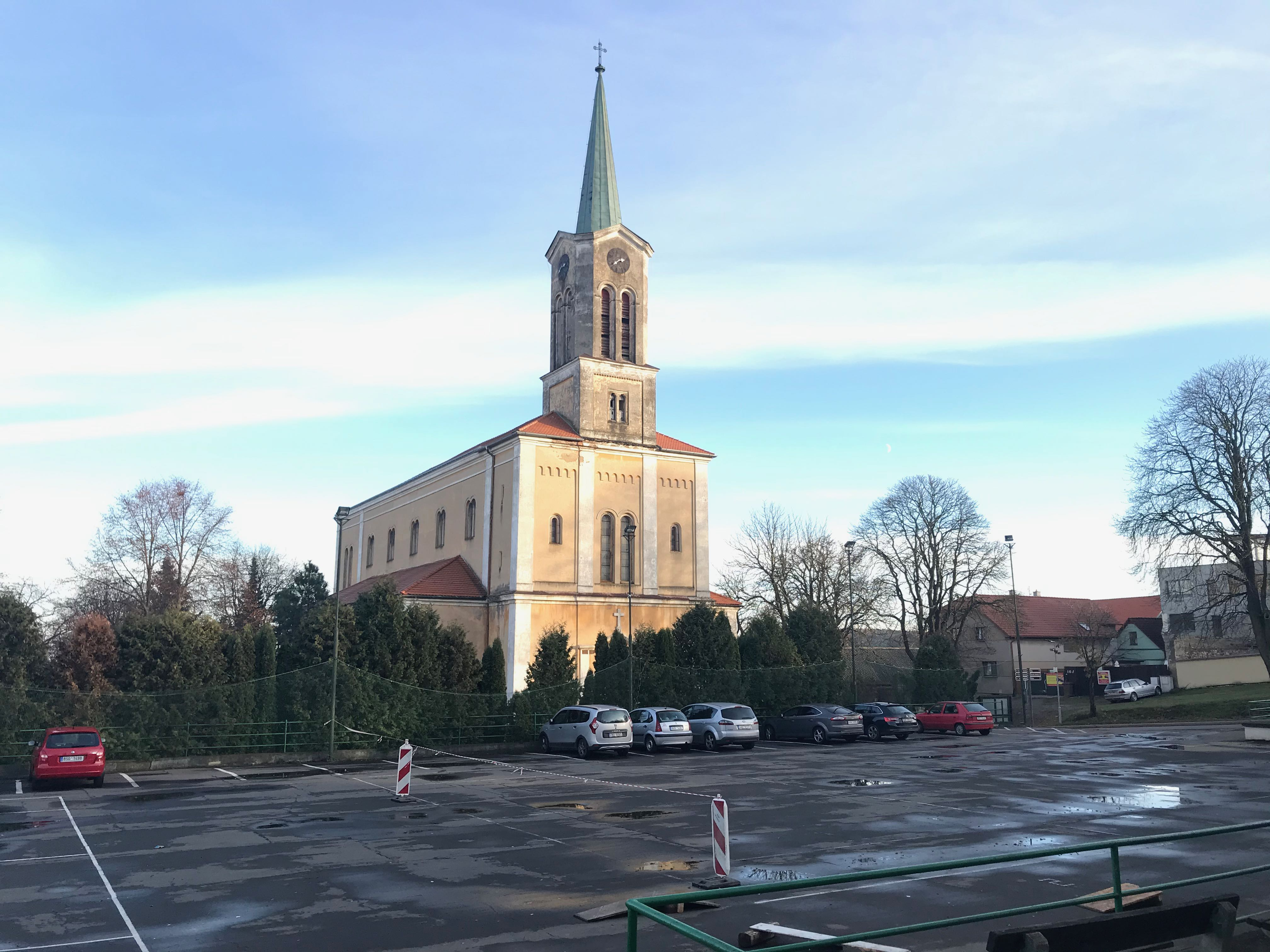
Church of Saint Thomas

The main landmark of Hudlice is the Church of Saint Thomas. It was built in the neo-Romanesque style 1874–1876, when it replaced an old wooden church.

On the hill Krušná hora is situated the wooden observation tower Máminka. It is 33 metres (108 ft) high.

The rock Hudlická skála is popular for tourists as a natural landmark of the municipality. Below the top of the rock is the entrance to the only non-karst cave in the Beroun District.

In the birthplace of Josef Jungmann, the Josef Jungmann Monument is located. It is a typical old Czech timbered cottage from 1718. It contains original furniture, and an exhibition of his life and work is installed.

== Notable people ==
- Josef Jungmann (1773–1847), poet and linguist
- Antonín Jan Jungmann (1775–1854), medical doctor and educator
