= Josef Jungmann =

Czech poet and linguist

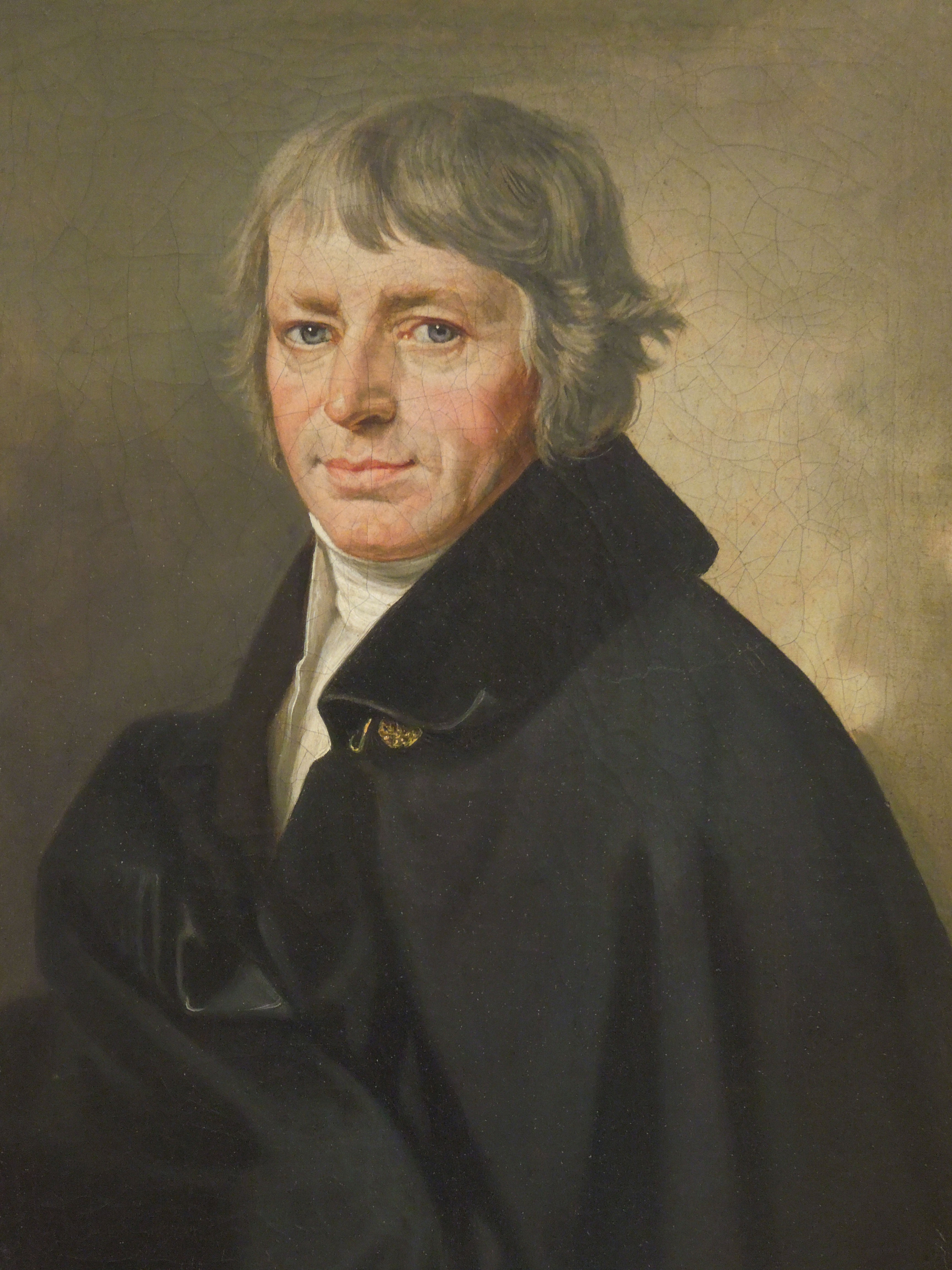
Portrait of Josef Jungmann by Antonín Machek (1833)

Josef Jungmann (16 July 1773 – 14 November 1847) was a Czech linguist and poet. He was a leading figure of the Czech National Revival and together with Josef Dobrovský, he is considered to be a creator of the modern Czech language. The Josef Jungmann Award for the best translation into Czech is named after him.

== Life ==
Josef Jungmann was born on 16 July 1773 in Hudlice near Beroun. He was the sixth child (out of ten) of a cobbler. His father was of Bohemian German descent and his mother was of Czech descent. The children grew up speaking both languages at home, which contributed heavily to Jungmann's later role as a revivalist of the Czech language. In his youth, he wanted to become a priest. After he completed grammar school in 1788-1792 however, he went on to study Philosophy and Law. Beginning in 1799, he started teaching at the local high school in Litoměřice (today known as Josef Jungmann Gymnasium), which had a German majority at that time. In 1815, he moved to Prague, where he worked until 1845 in the Old Town Academic Grammar School as a Czech professor. He earned a doctorate in Philosophy and Mathematics in 1817; he was the dean of the Faculty of Arts in 1827 and 1838. In 1840, he became the rector of Charles University in Prague. He died on 14 November 1847 in Prague.

== Work ==
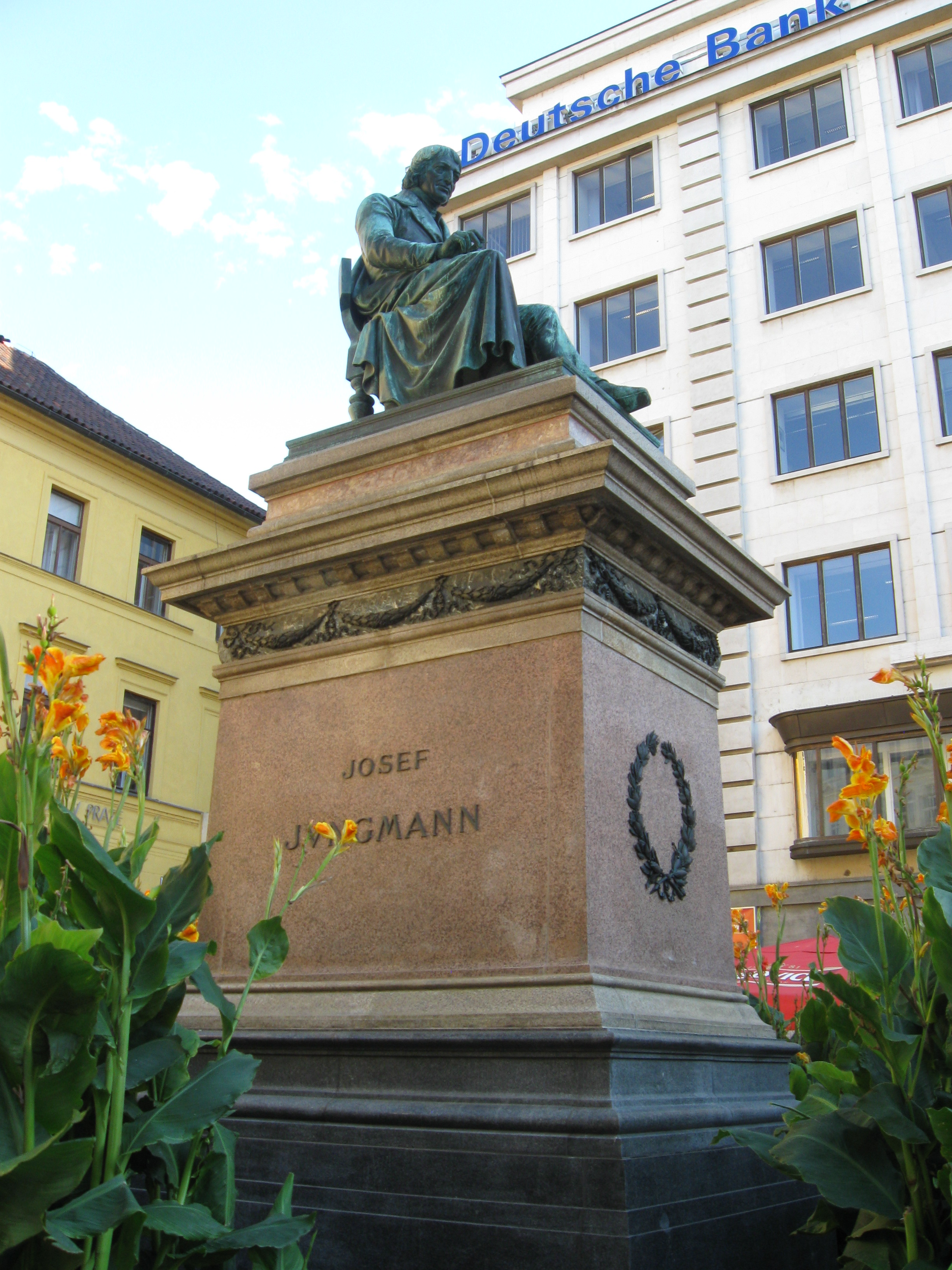
Statue of Josef Jungmann in Prague

Jungmann was a rigorous advocate of the rebirth of the written Czech language. In contrast to his teacher, Josef Dobrovský, he also wrote his works in Czech. In 1805, he published a translation of Chateaubriand's Atala. By this, he intended to prove that the Czech language is suitable for complicated artistic texts. Later, he published translations of Johann Wolfgang Goethe, Friedrich Schiller and John Milton. His translation of Paradise Lost by Milton was called by Derek Sayer "the cornerstone" of the modern literary Czech language. Jungmann's original poems are few, but include two early Revival sonnets and the short narrative poem Oldřich a Božena.

In following years, he published a series of polemic texts, most notably the "Talks on Czech Language". In 1820, he published "Slovesnost", which was a kind of a stylistic textbook. In 1825, a "History of Czech literature" followed.

His most important work is the Czech–German dictionary in five volumes (1834–39). In this dictionary, he laid out the basis for the modern Czech vocabulary. In order to achieve the stylistic range of vocabulary he desired, for poetic effect, and in order to expand the lexical resources of Czech, Jungmann revived archaic words, for which he studied historical documents, or borrowed from other Slavic languages, and created neologisms. Many of his words became a permanent part of the language.

== Honours ==
Jungmannova Street and Jungmannovo náměstí (Jungmann's Square) in Prague are named after him; the square contains a large statue of Josef Jungmann. There is also a Jungmannova Street named for him in the Petržalka district of Bratislava, Slovakia.

=== Literature ===
- Antibohemia, 1814
- Historie literatury české aneb Soustavný přehled spisů českých, s krátkou historií národu, osvícení a jazyka, 1825
  - History of Czech Literature, or Systematic Survey of Czech Writings, with a Short History of the Nation, Enlightenment and Language, 1825
- Krok
- Nepředsudečné mínění o české prozódii, 1804
- O jazyku českém, 1806
  - On the Czech Language, 1806
- O klasičnosti literatury a důležitosti její
  - On Classical Literature and Its Importance
- Oldřich a Božena, 1806
- Rozmlouvání o jazyku českém
  - Talks on the Czech Language
- Slovesnost aneb Sbírka příkladů s krátkým pojednáním o slohu, 1820
- Slovník česko-německý, 1834–1839 (5 dílů)
  - Czech-German Dictionary, 1834–1839 (5 editions)
- Slovo ke statečnému a blahovzdělanému Bohemariusovi, 1814
- Zápisky, 1871
  - Notes, 1871

== Biographies ==
- Emanuel Chalupný: Jungmann, Prague 1909
- Julius Dolanský: Jungmannův odkaz (Z dějin české slovesnosti), Prague 1948

Educational offices
Preceded by Antonín Jan Jungmann	Rector of Charles University in Prague; 1840	Succeeded by Antonín Karel Mudroch
