= Bački Petrovac =

Bački Petrovac Бачки Петровац (Serbian) Báčsky Petrovec (Slovak)
- Town and municipality
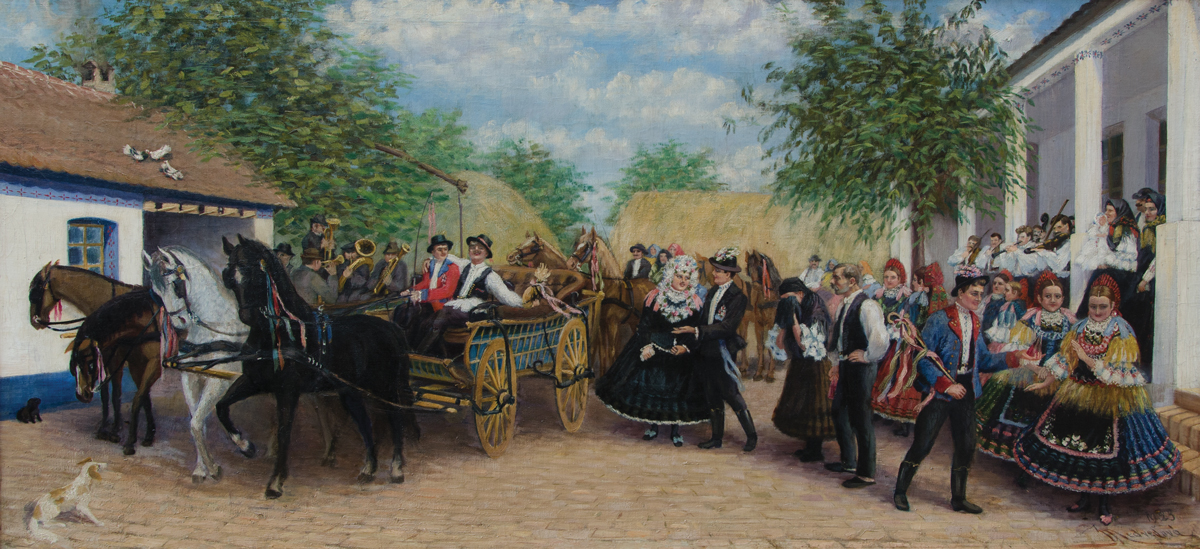
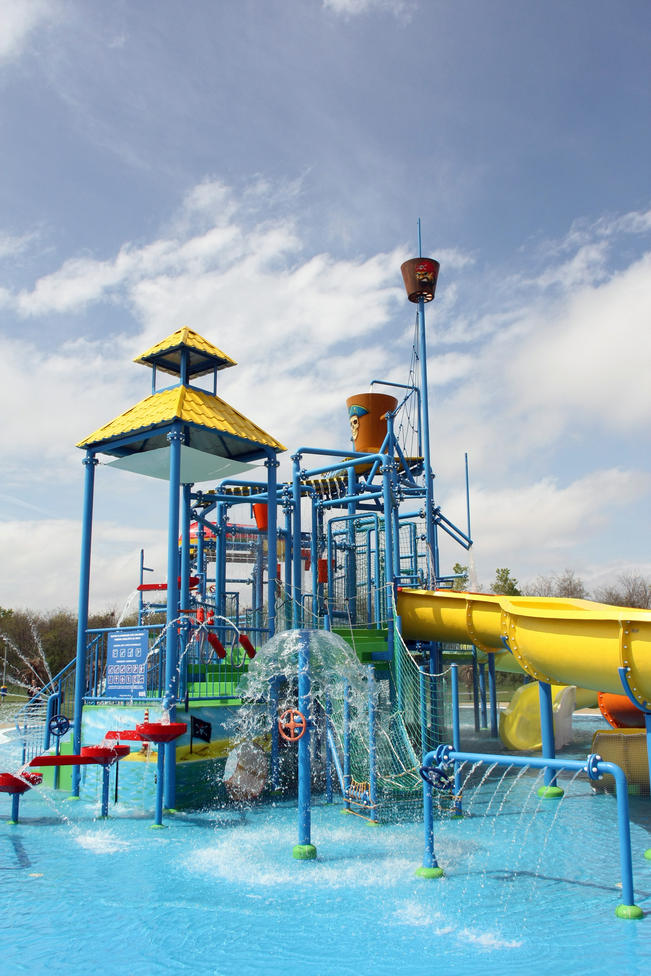
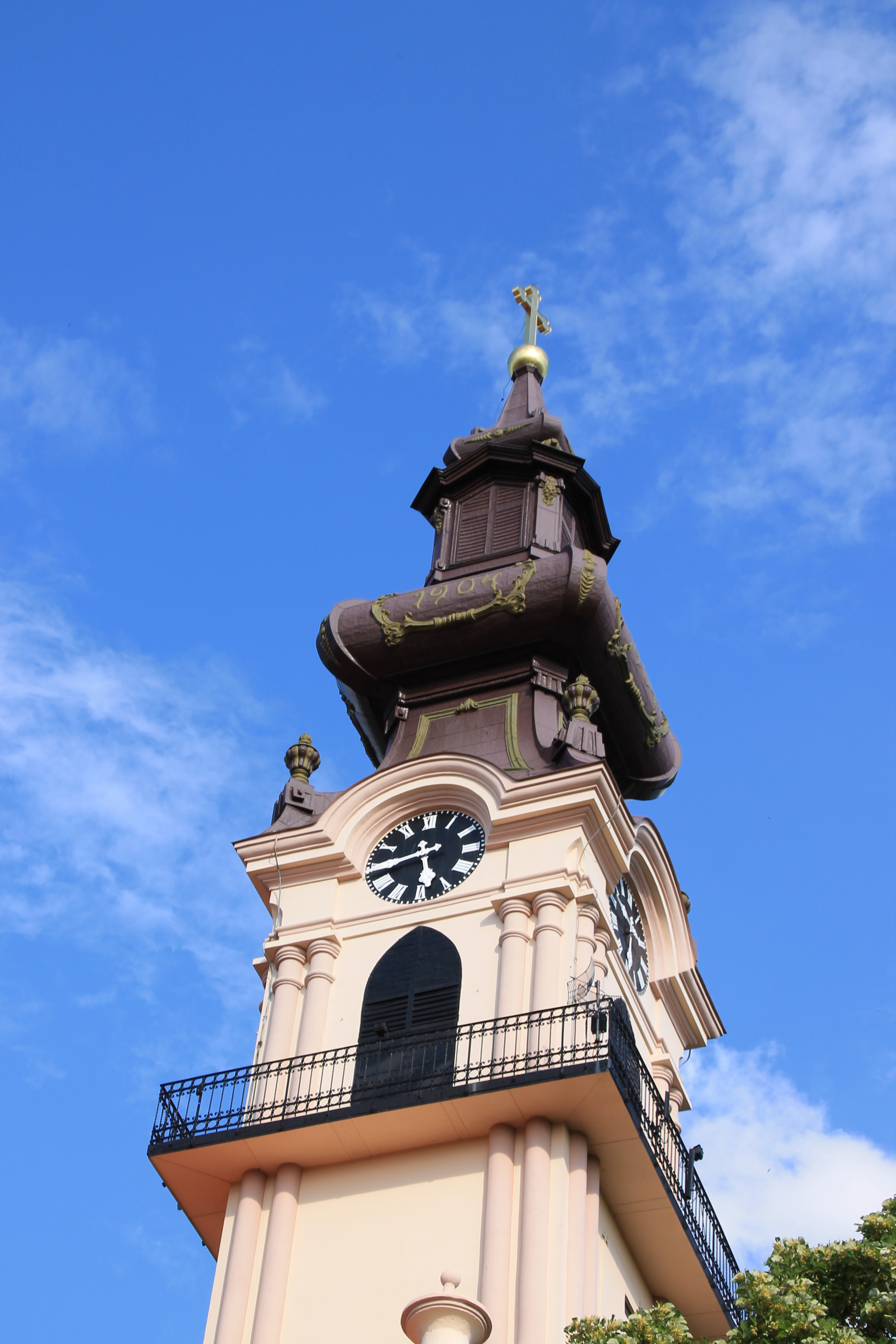
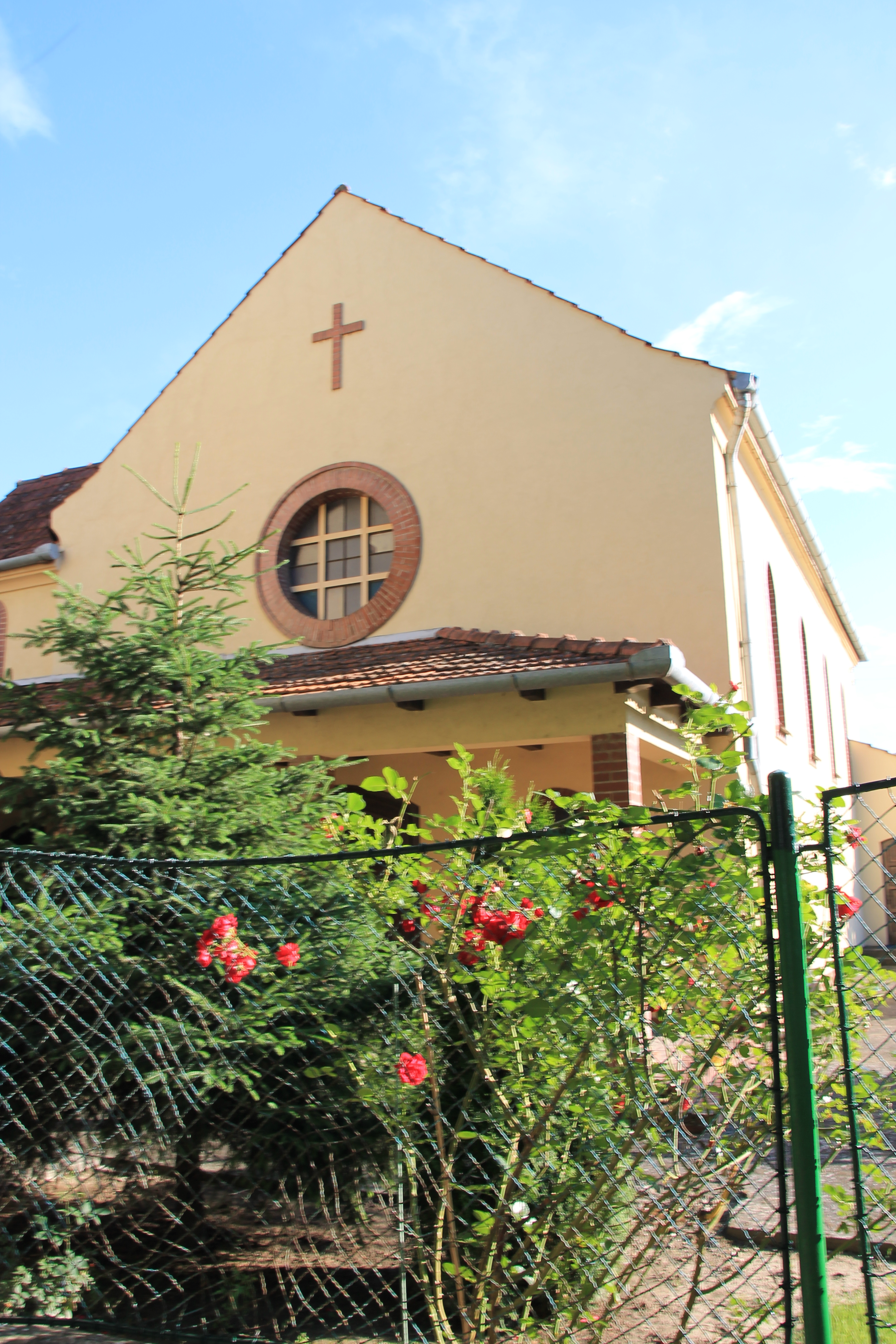
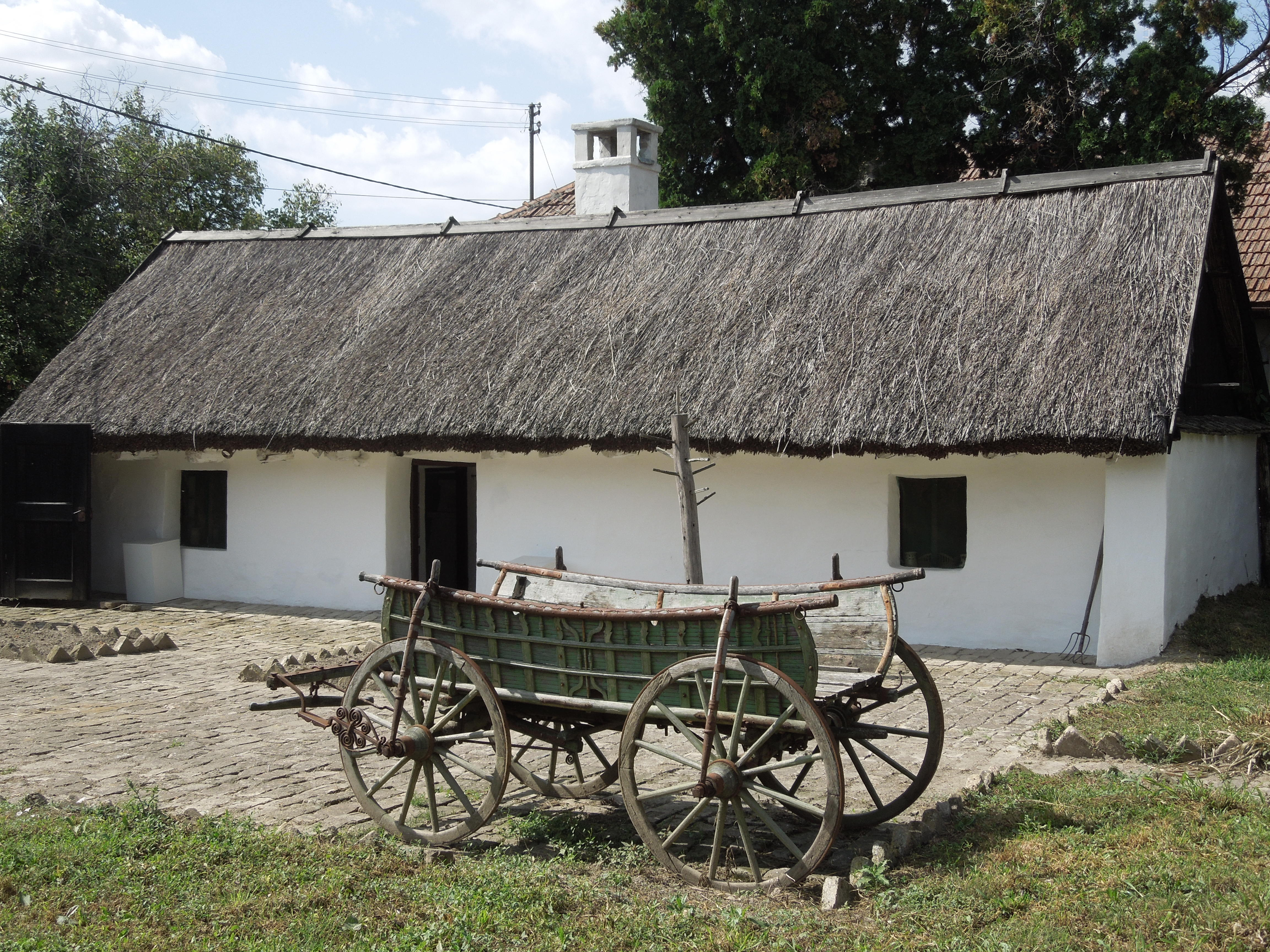
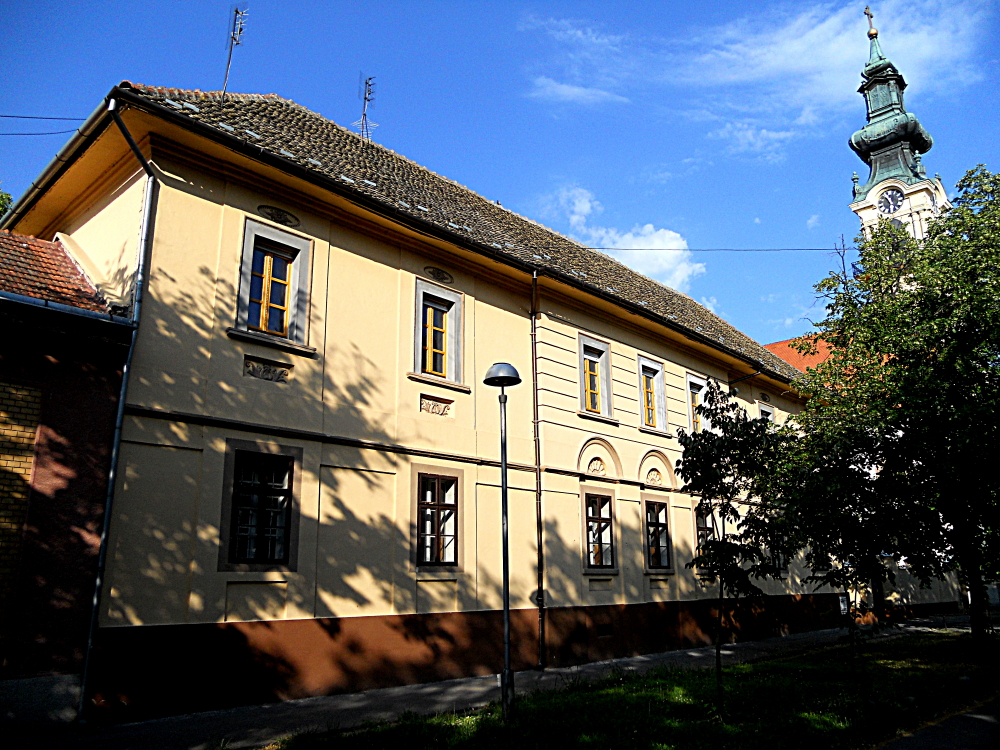
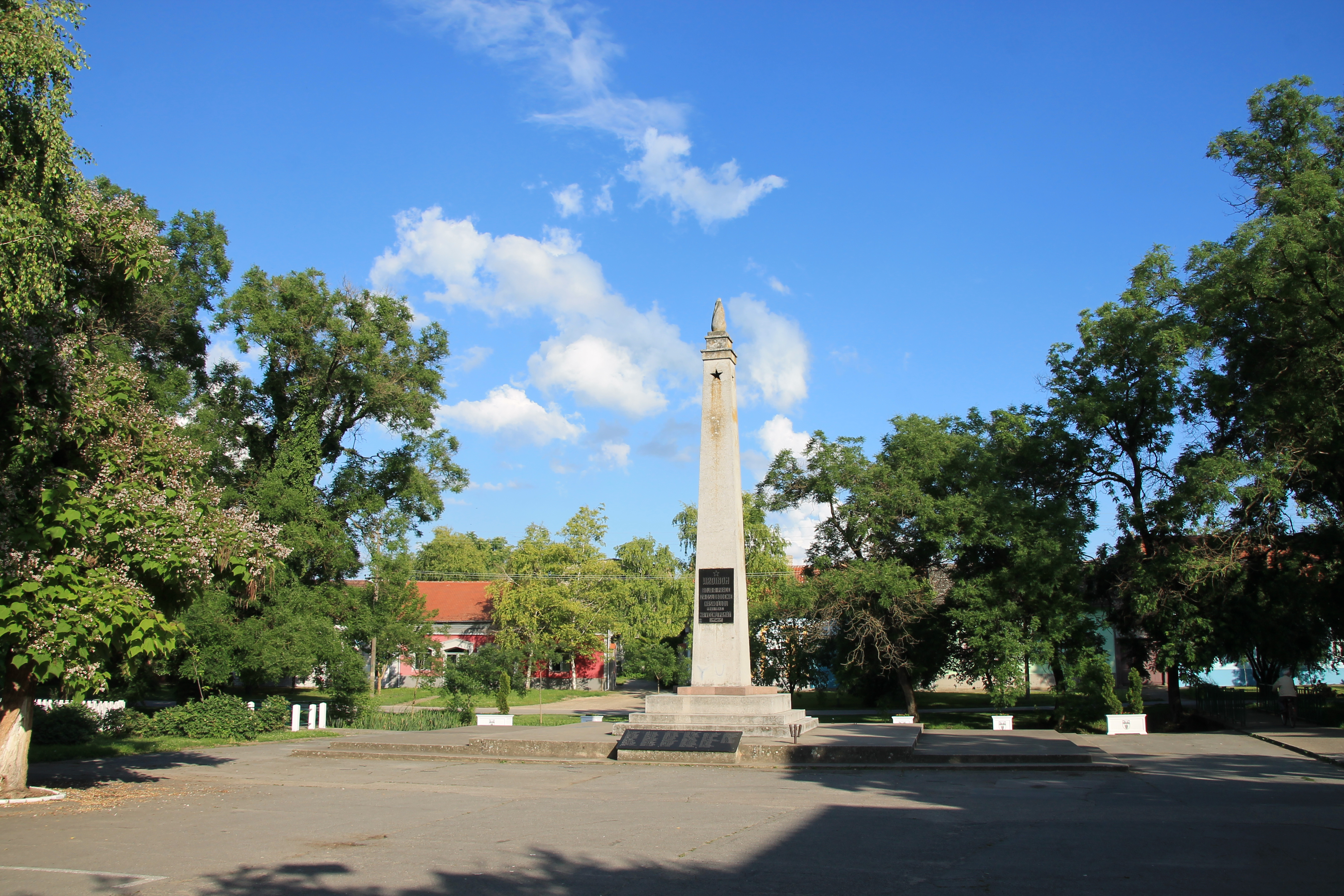
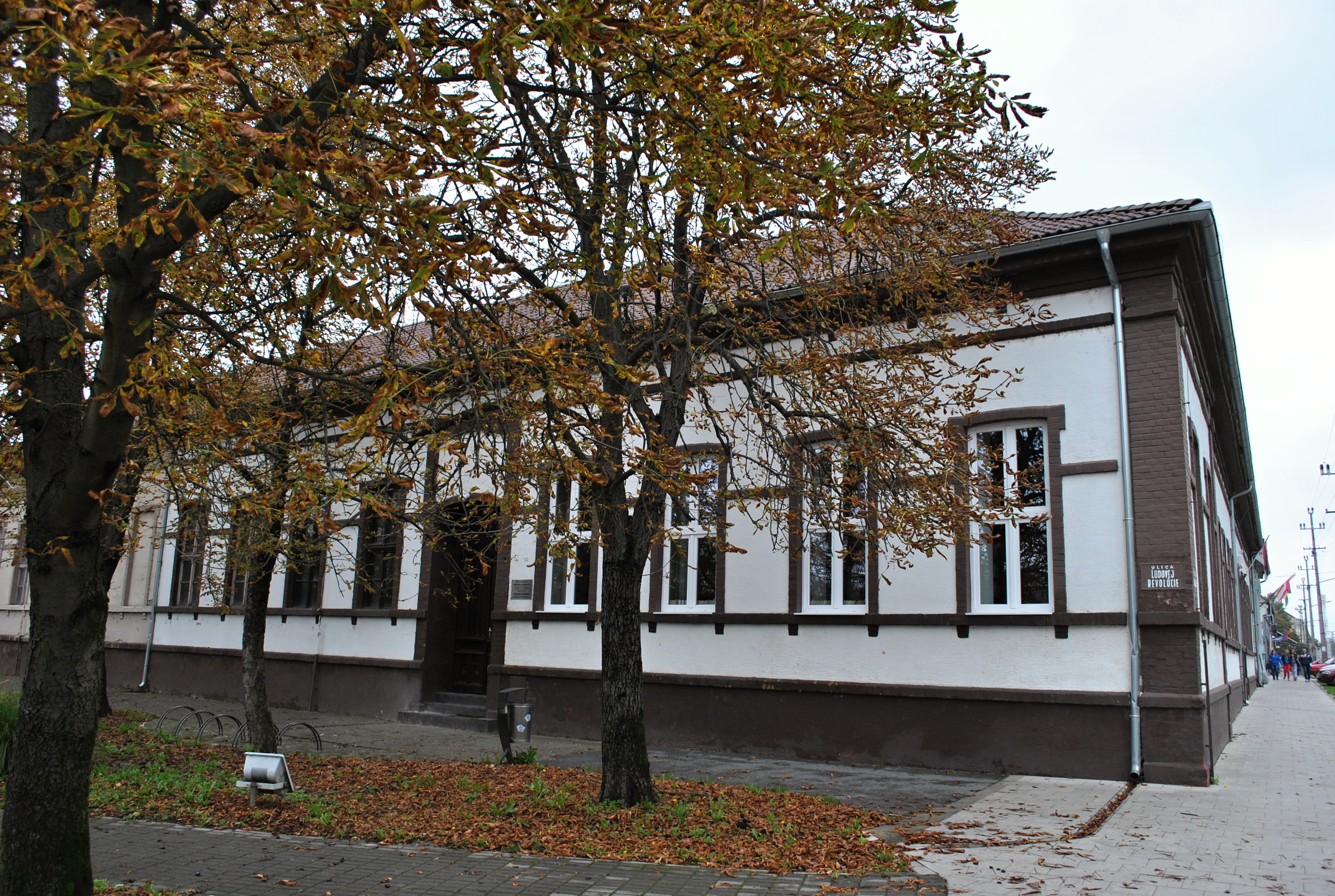
- Bački Petrovac

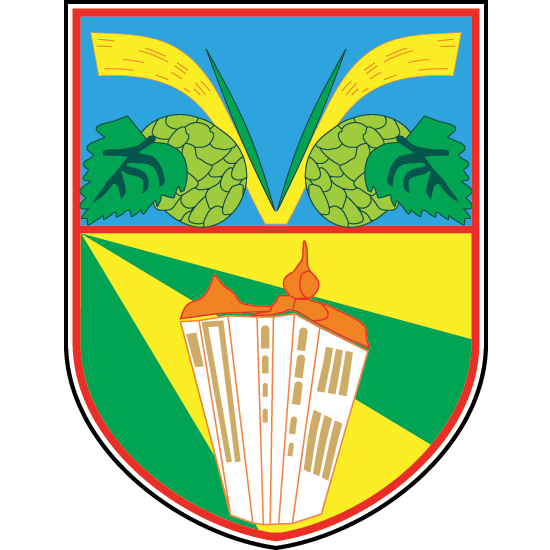
- Coat of arms

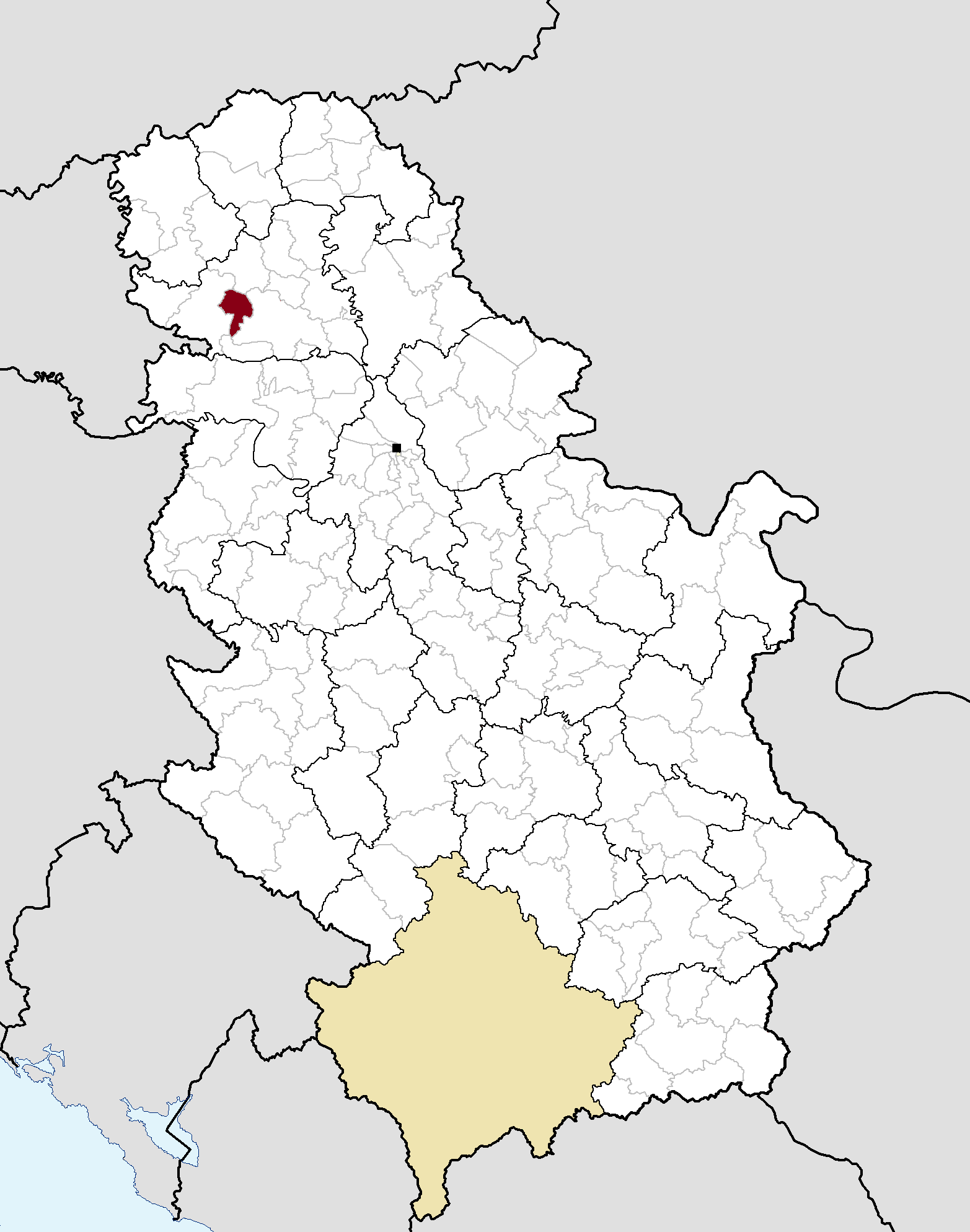
- Location of Bački Petrovac within Serbia
- Coordinates: 45°21′38″N 19°35′30″E
- Country: Serbia
- Province: Vojvodina
- District: South Bačka

Government
  - Mayor: Viera Krstovski (SNS)

Area
  - Town: 63.84 km^{2} (24.65 sq mi)
  - Municipality: 158.35 km^{2} (61.14 sq mi)
- Elevation: 86 m (282 ft)

Population (2022 census)
  - Town: 5,227
  - Town density: 81.88/km^{2} (212.1/sq mi)
  - Municipality: 11,512
  - Municipality density: 72.700/km^{2} (188.29/sq mi)
- Time zone: UTC+1 (CET)
  - Summer (DST): UTC+2 (CEST)
- Postal code: 21470
- Area code: +381(0)21
- Car plates: NS
- Official languages: Serbian together with Slovak
- Website: www.backipetrovac.rs

Bački Petrovac (Serbian Cyrillic: Бачки Петровац; Slovak: Báčsky Petrovec; Hungarian: Petrőc) is a town and municipality located in the South Bačka District, province of Vojvodina, Serbia. The town has a population of 5,227, while the municipality has 11,512 inhabitants.

== Name ==
In Serbian Cyrillic the town is known as Бачки Петровац, in Serbian Latin as Bački Petrovac, in Slovak as Petrovec or Báčsky Petrovec, in Hungarian as Petrőc, and in German as Petrovacz.

Bački Petrovac is the economical, cultural and administrative center of the municipality. It is a settlement of a town character, while the other three are villages of Pannonian type.

== History ==
Being in south Bačka which according to special climatic and other conditions is one of the most fertile parts of Serbia, very suitable for settling down, here in this region people made their settlements very early. The first written records about Petrovac appears in the 13th century when Petrovac is mentioned as a church parish belonging to Bač County. Later that name is changed into Petrovac. Its first inhabitants were the Hungarians and Serbs. In the first half of the 18th century (1745) the Slovaks settled here. Since then Petrovac developed so that it represents cultural, economic, clerical and political center of the Slovaks in this region.

The first library was founded in Petrovac in 1845, and the first theater play was performed here in 1866. Slovak Gymnasium was established in Petrovac in 1919.

== Inhabited places ==
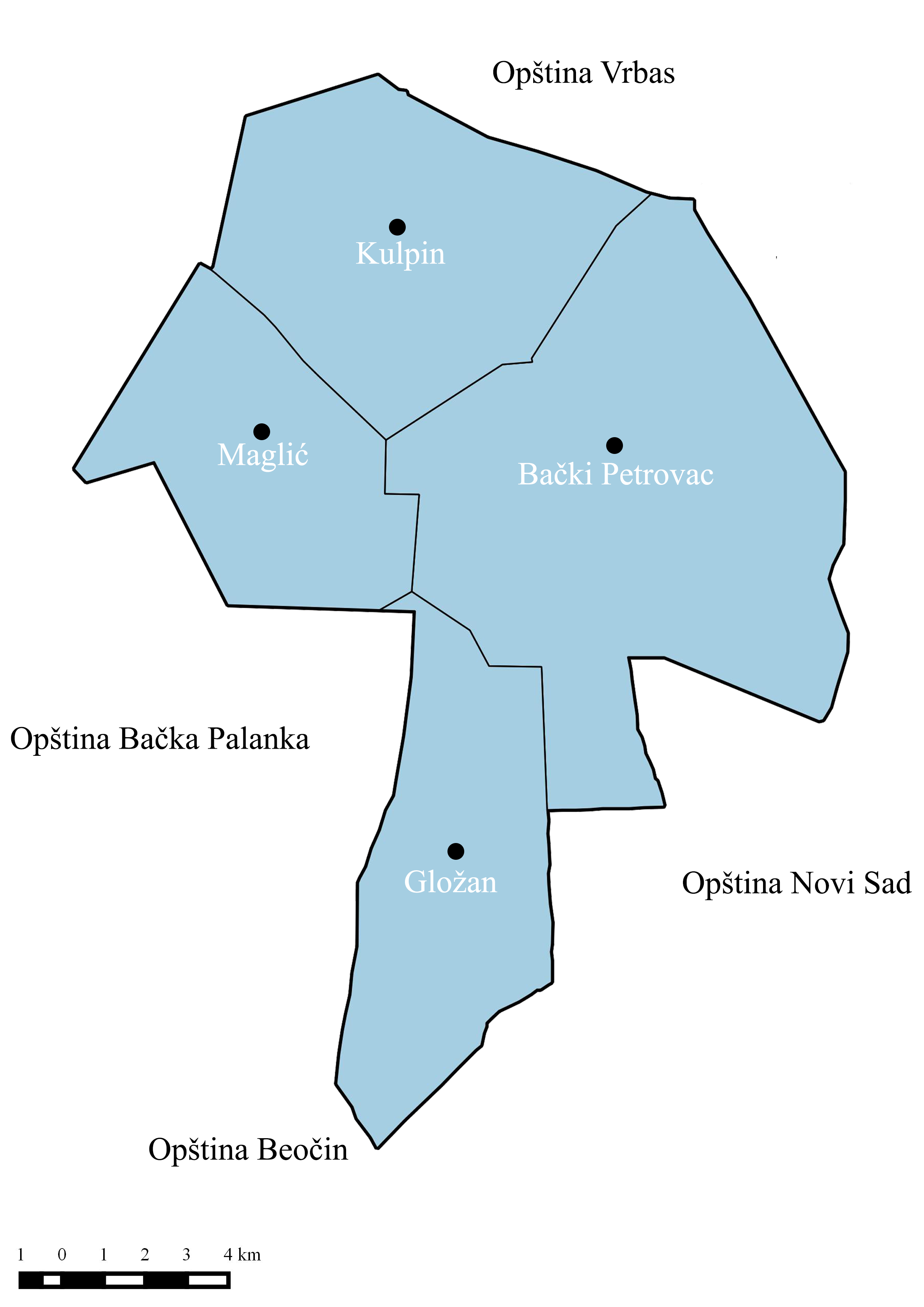
Map of Bački Petrovac municipality

Bački Petrovac municipality includes the town of Bački Petrovac and the following villages:

- Gložan (Slovak: Hložany)
- Kulpin (Slovak: Kulpín)
- Maglić

Note: for the places with Slovak majority, the names are also given in Slovak.

== Demographics ==
Historical population
Year	Pop.	±% p.a.
1948	13,814	—
1953	15,142	+1.85%
1961	16,865	+1.36%
1971	16,042	−0.50%
1981	16,095	+0.03%
1991	15,662	−0.27%
2002	14,681	−0.59%
2011	13,418	−0.99%
2022	11,512	−1.38%

According to the 2022 census results, the municipality has 11,512 inhabitants.

=== Ethnic groups ===
The ethnic Slovaks form a majority of the population in the municipality. Settlements with Slovak majorities are: Bački Petrovac (Slovak: Báčsky Petrovec), Gložan (Slovak: Hložany), and Kulpin (Slovak: Kulpín). There is one settlement with a Serb majority: Maglić. The town is located in southern Bačka (hence the name), some 25 km northwest of Novi Sad, the capital of Vojvodina. It is the cultural center of Slovaks in the province, and other places in the eponymous municipalities are also inhabited by many Slovaks.

The ethnic composition of the municipality:

Ethnic group	Population	%
Slovaks	6,975	60.6%
Serbs	3,227	28%
Roma	119	1%
Yugoslavs	91	0.8%
Hungarians	75	0.6%
Croats	71	0.6%
Albanians	24	0.2%
Others	930	8.1%
Total	11,512	

== Economy ==
Agriculture is the most important economic activity based on the production of field crops (wheat, corn, broom weed, sugar beet, hop), cattle, breeding dud ponetry and vegetable crops. Besides agriculture there is also some industry manufacture, metal and chemical. Manufacture of wood civil engineering, printing activities, etc.

The following table gives a preview of total number of employed people per their core activity (as of 2017):

Activity	Total
Agriculture, forestry and fishing	390
Mining	1
Processing industry	1,862
Distribution of power, gas and water	5
Distribution of water and water waste management	54
Construction	138
Wholesale and retail, repair	451
Traffic, storage and communication	82
Hotels and restaurants	159
Media and telecommunications	36
Finance and insurance	17
Property stock and charter	11
Professional, scientific, innovative and technical activities	216
Administrative and other services	101
Administration and social assurance	140
Education	215
Healthcare and social work	154
Art, leisure and recreation	14
Other services	42
Total	4,090

== Cultural Monuments ==
The Slovak Evangelical Church in Bački Petrovac was errected in 1783, and enlarged and refurbished in 1822. Next to the church is a one-story parish house, with two rows of windows, decorated with plant and geometric motifs. The complex is protected as a cultural monument of great importance.

The oldest house in Bački Petrovac dates back from the late 18th century. It contains typical ethnographic objects from this area and is a part of the traditional architecture complex of the Museum of Vojvodina Slovaks.

== Gallery ==
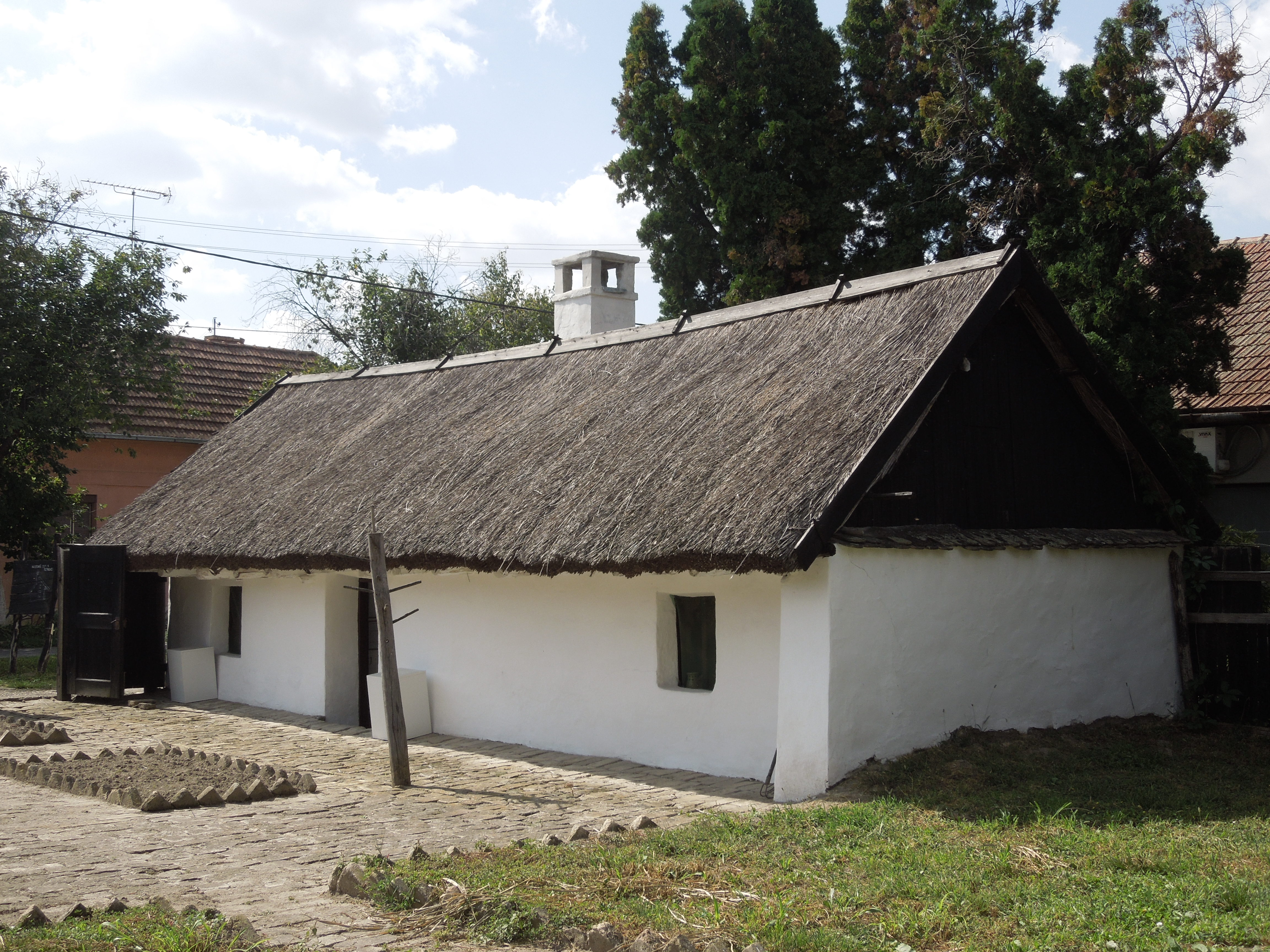
The "Oldest house in Bački Petrovac" built in 1799

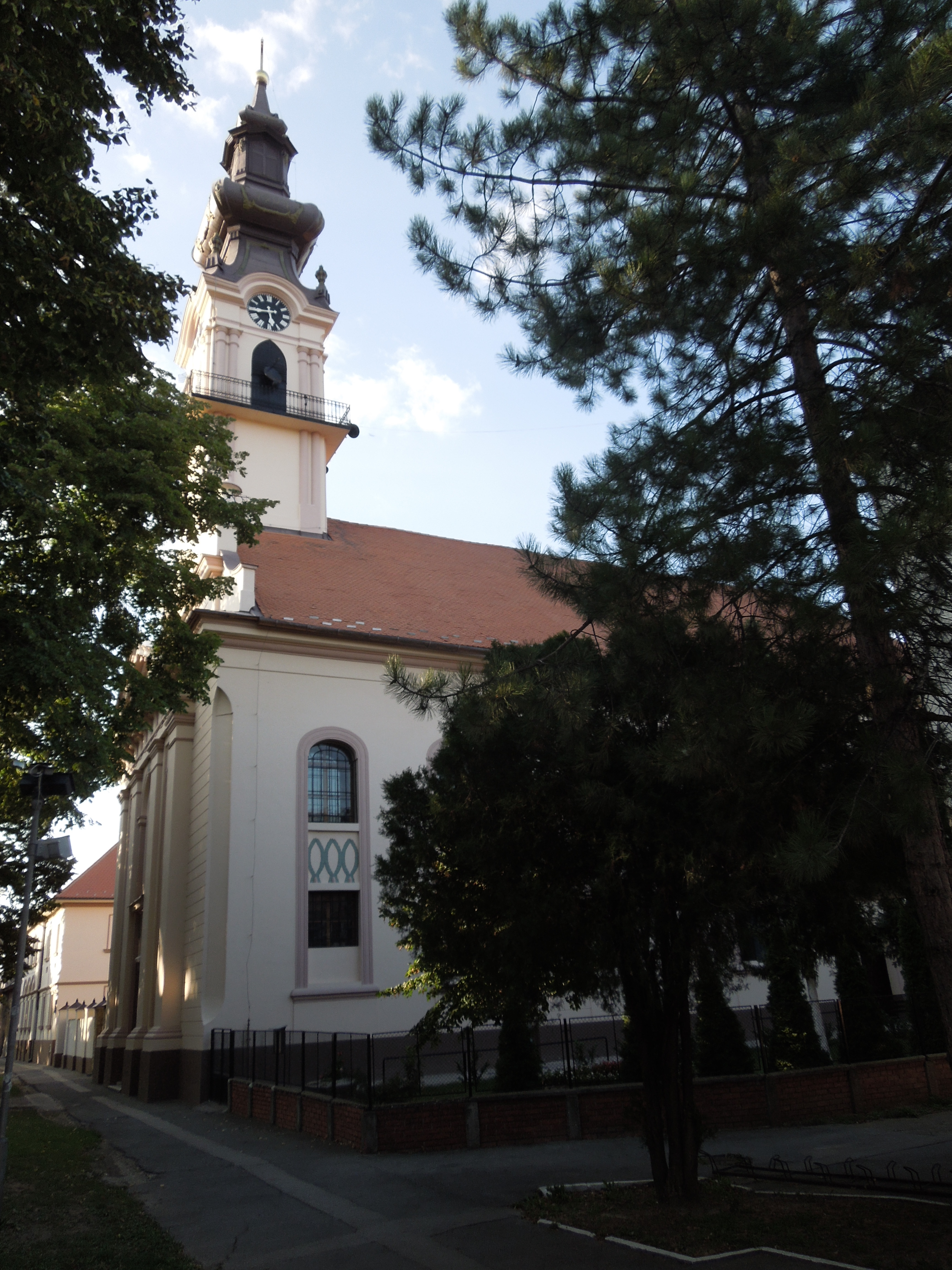
The Evangelist Church in Bački Petrovac

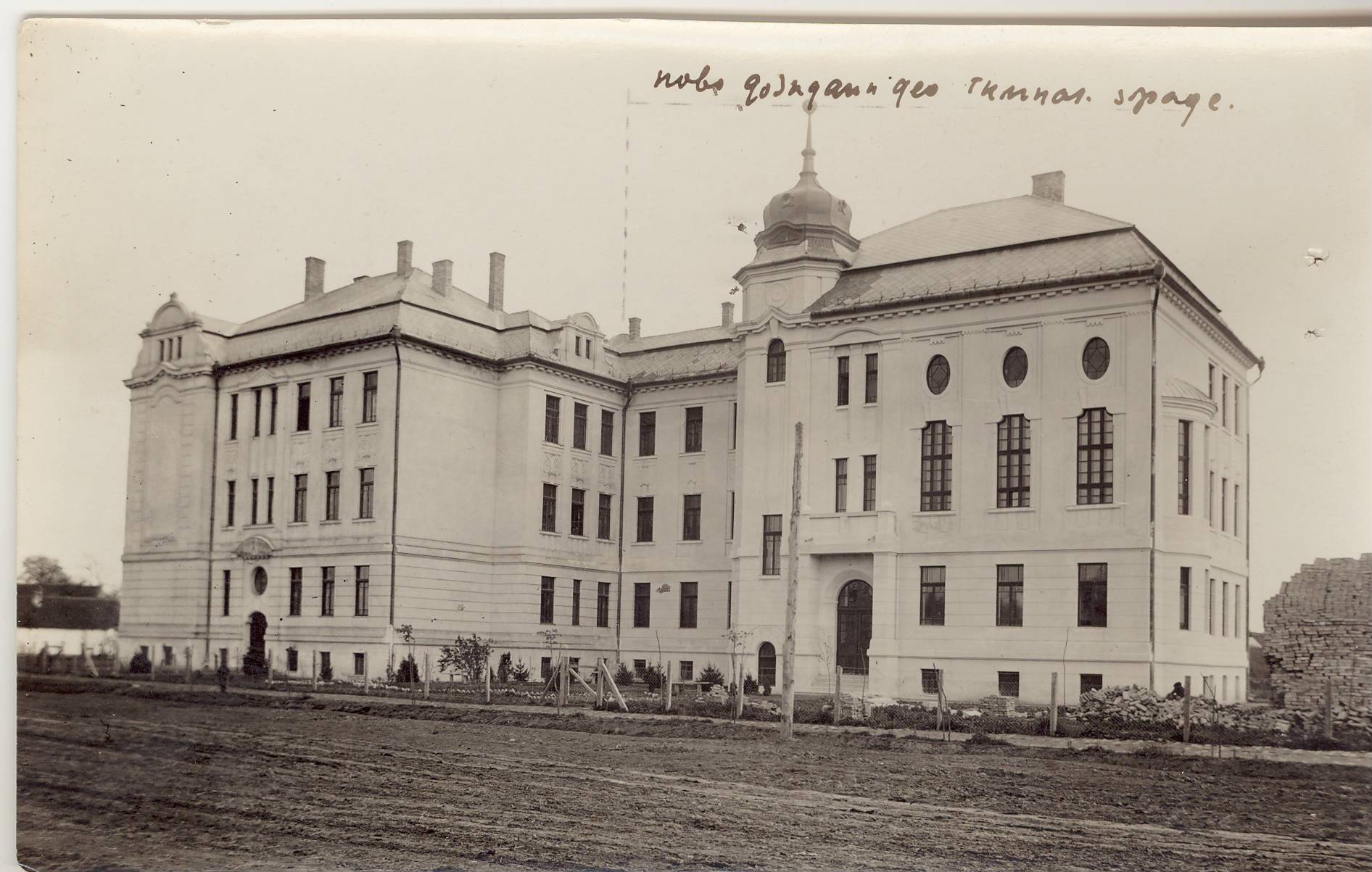
The building of the Ján Kollár Gymnasium and Students' Home in Bački Petrovac, first half of the 20th century

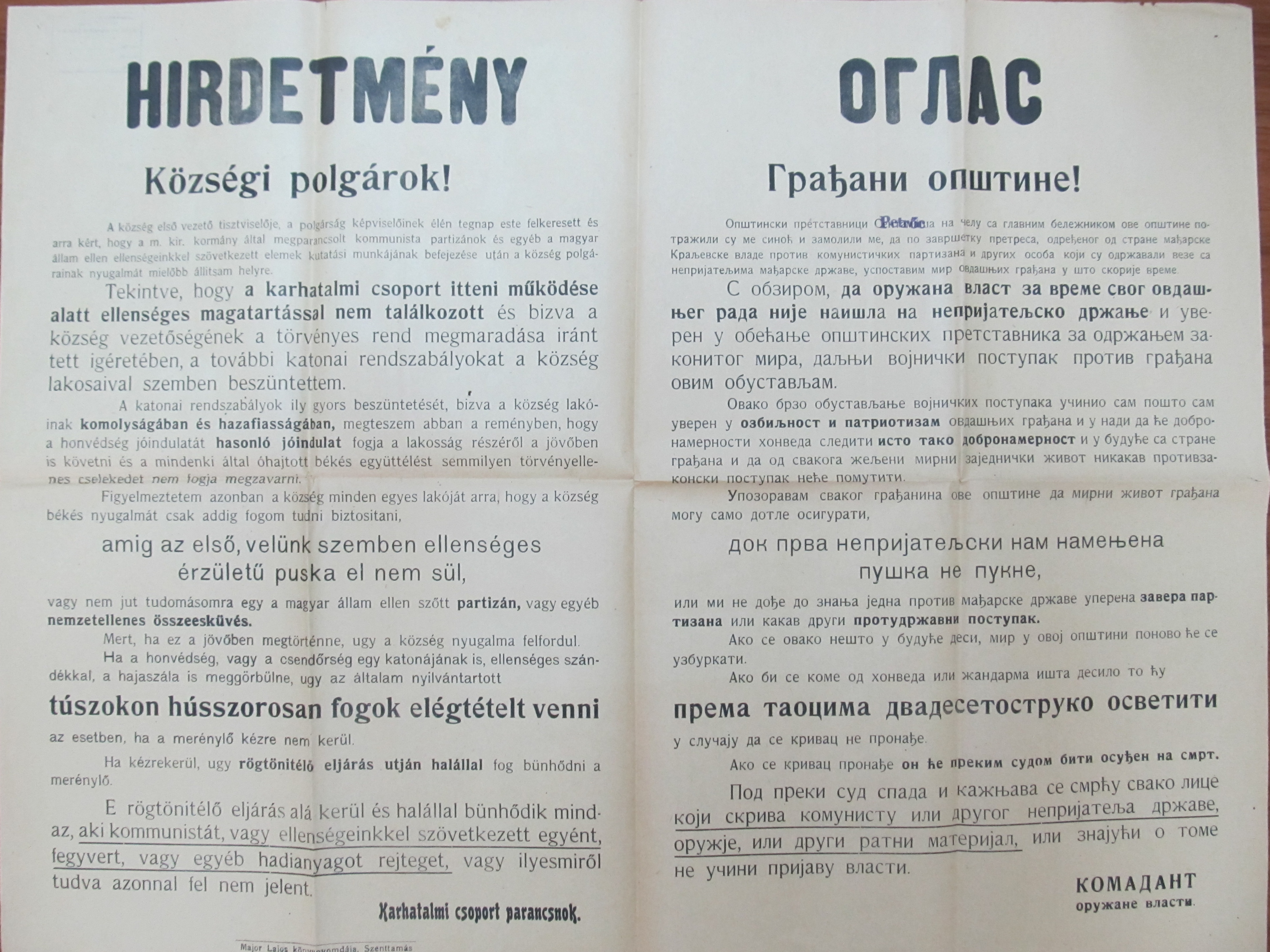
WW2-era poster from Bački Petrovac in Hungarian and Serbian, threatening twentyfold reprisal for the killing of soldiers by partisans

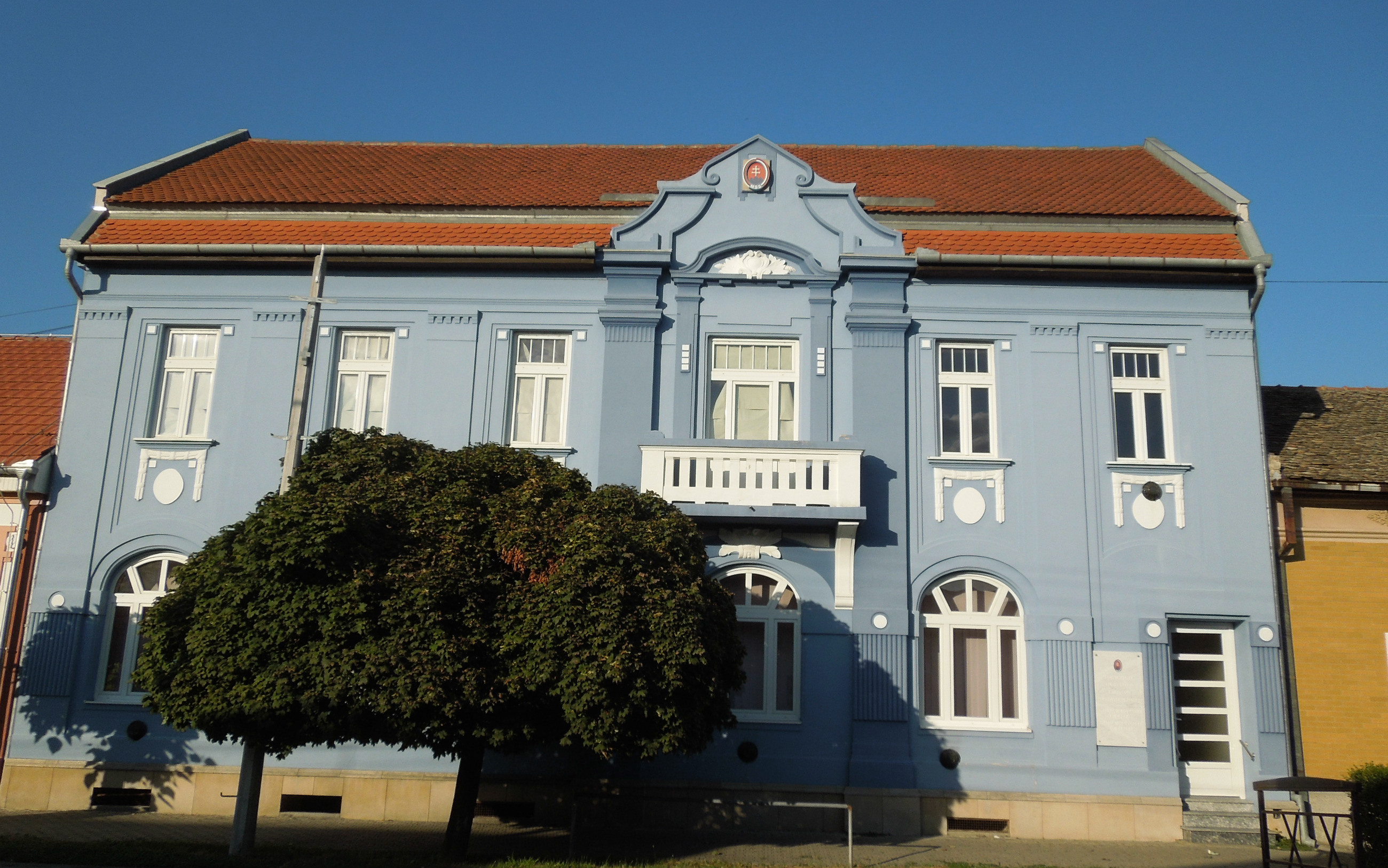
Matica slovenská in Bački Petrovac

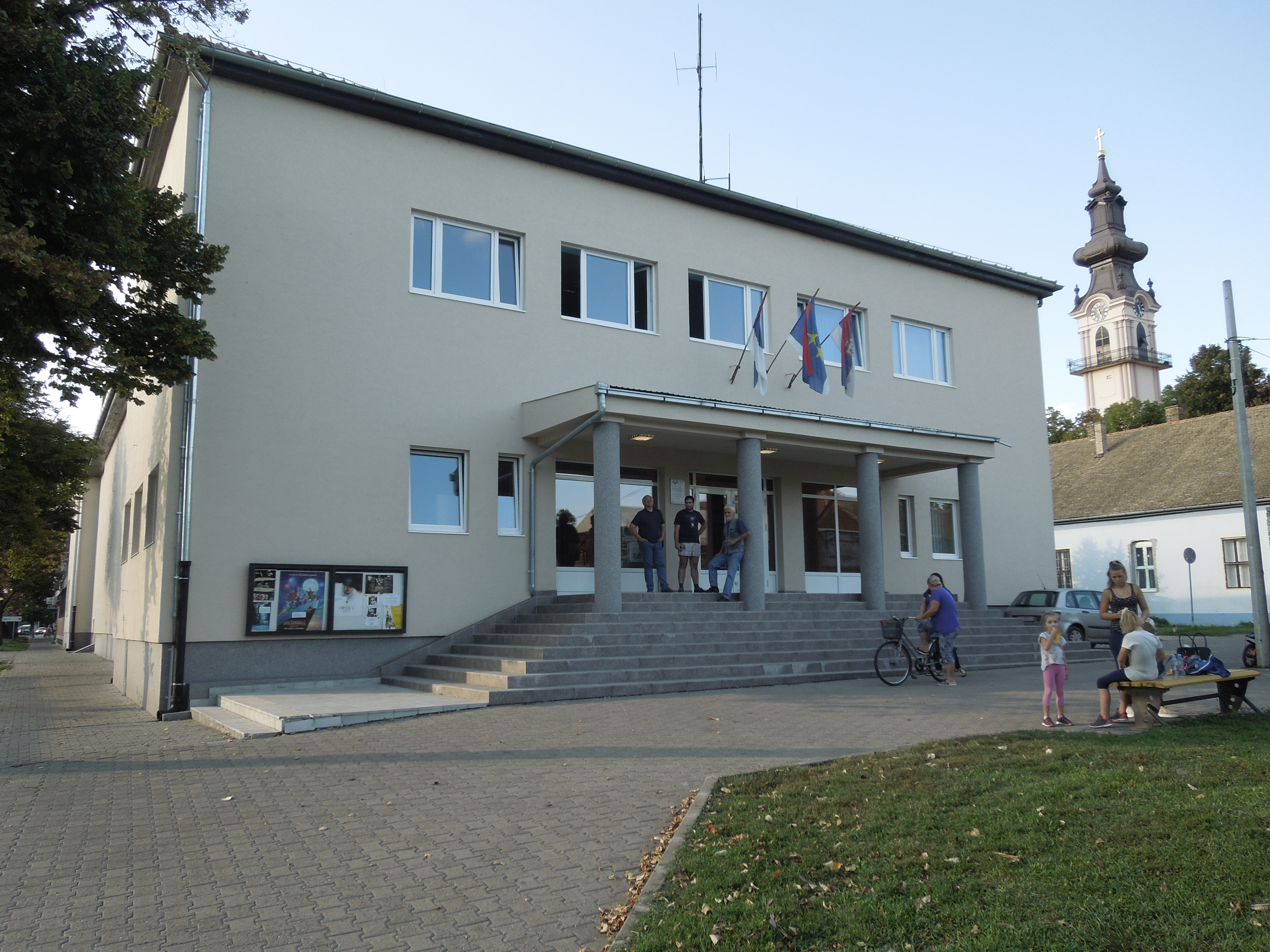
The Slovak Vojvodina Theatre in Bački Petrovac

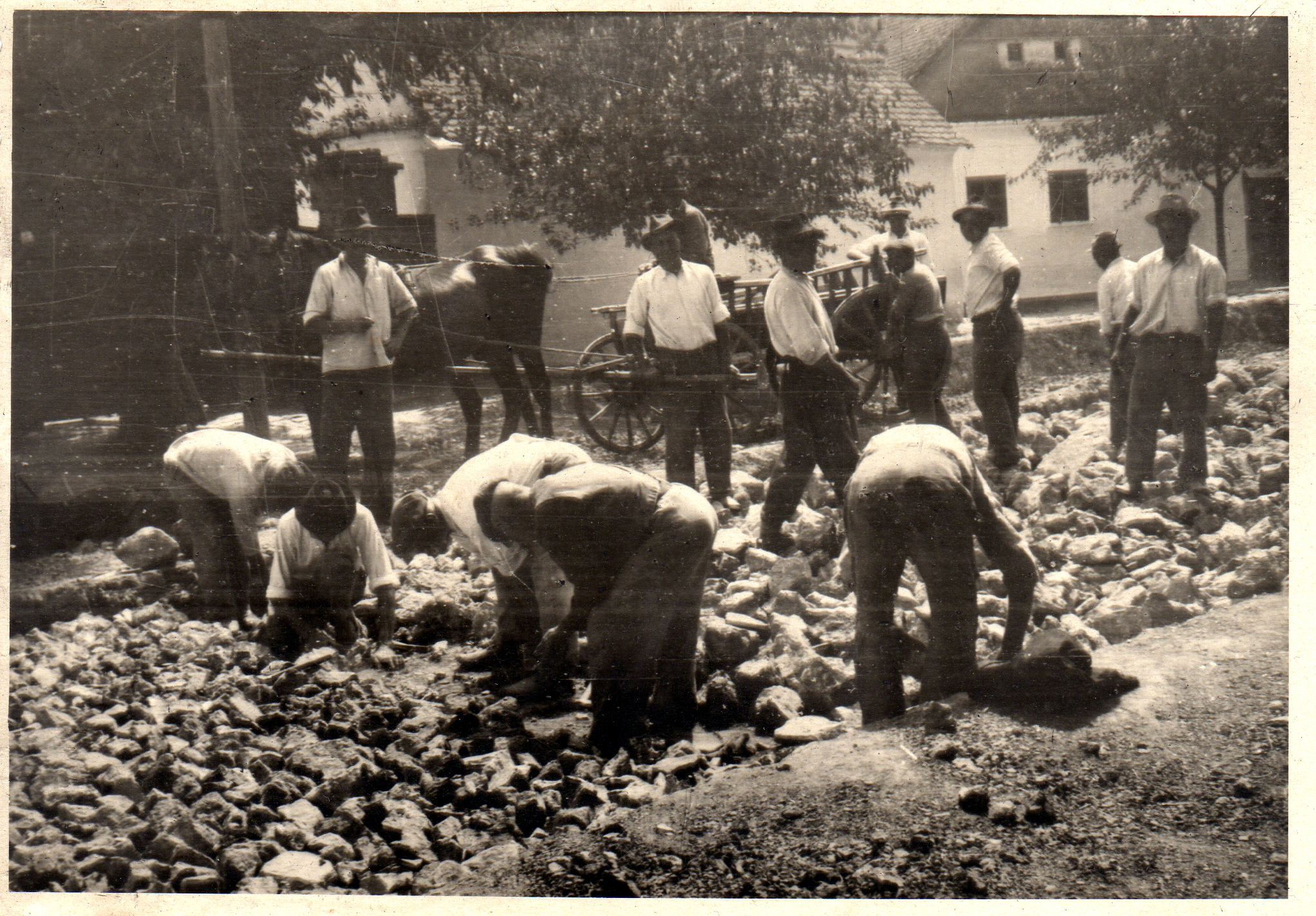
Workers building a road in Bački Petrovac

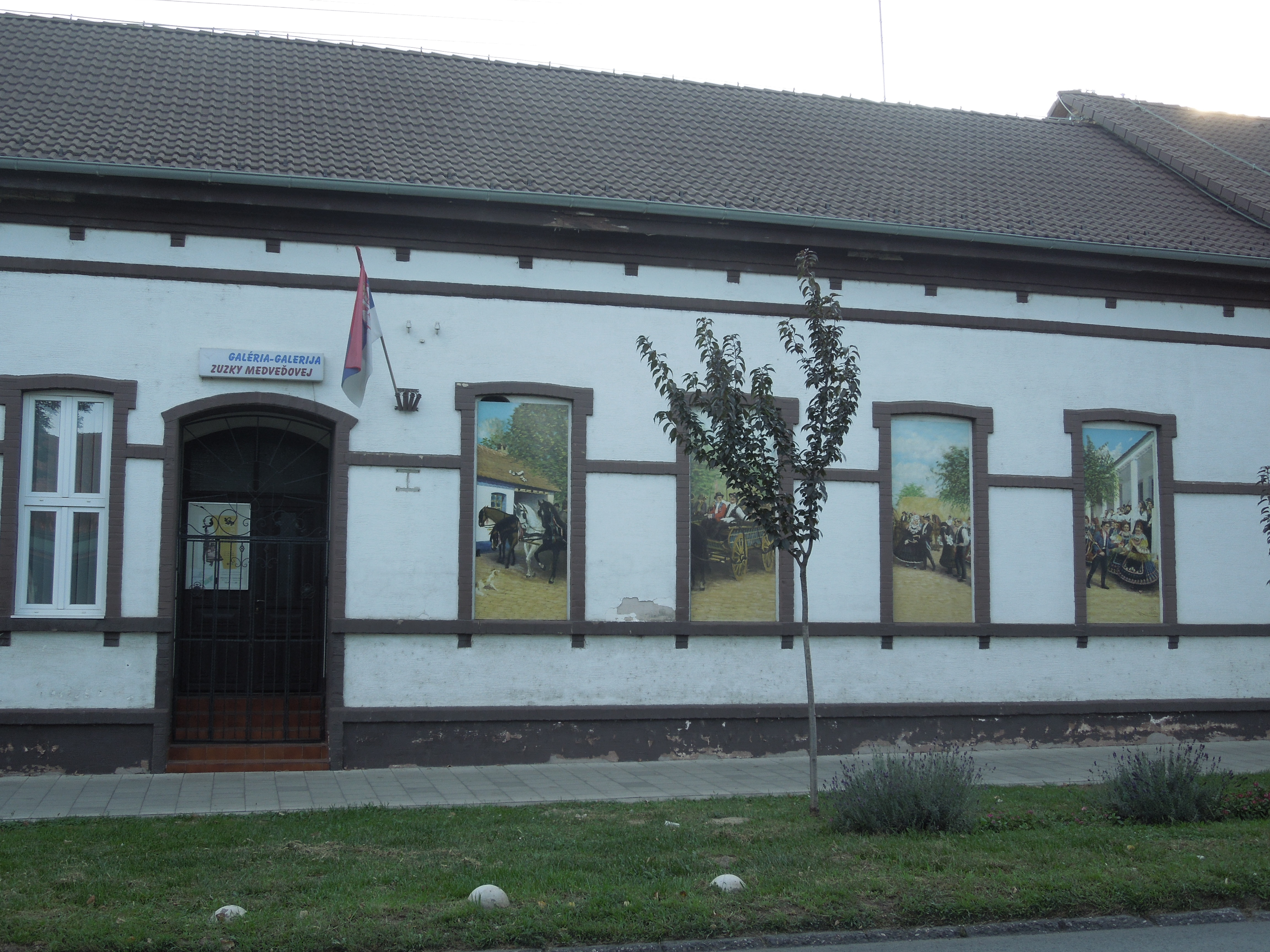
Gallery of Zuzka Medveďová in Bački Petrovac

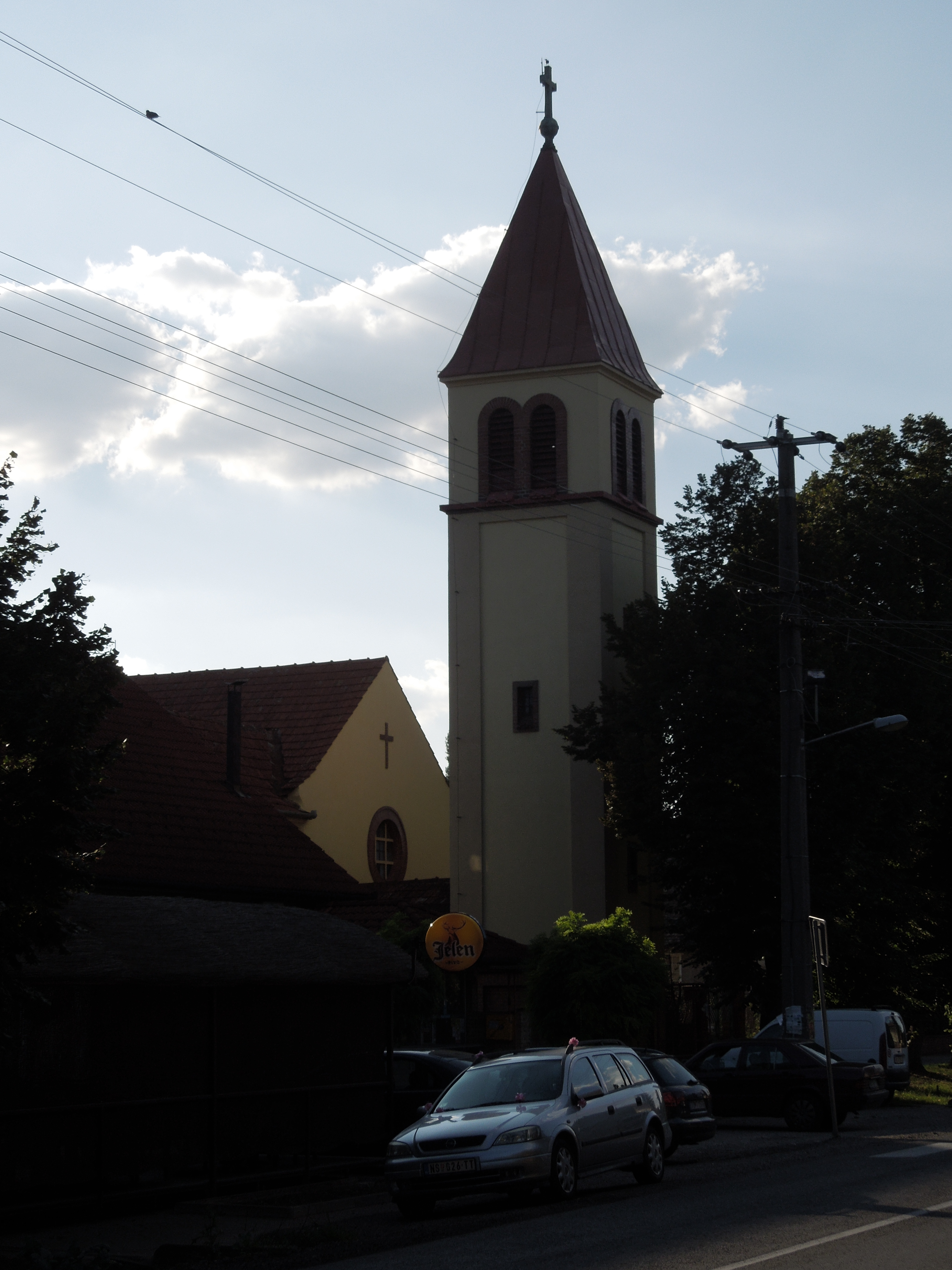
The Catholic Church in Bački Petrovac

== International relations ==
=== Twin towns — Sister cities ===
Bački Petrovac is twinned with:

- Babušnica, Serbia
- Martin, Slovakia
- Nitra, Slovakia
- Ružomberok, Slovakia
- Stará Ľubovňa, Slovakia
- Vukovar, Croatia
- Kirchheim unter Teck, Germany

== See also ==
- List of places in Serbia
- List of cities, towns and villages in Vojvodina
