= Ján Kollár Gymnasium and Students' Home =

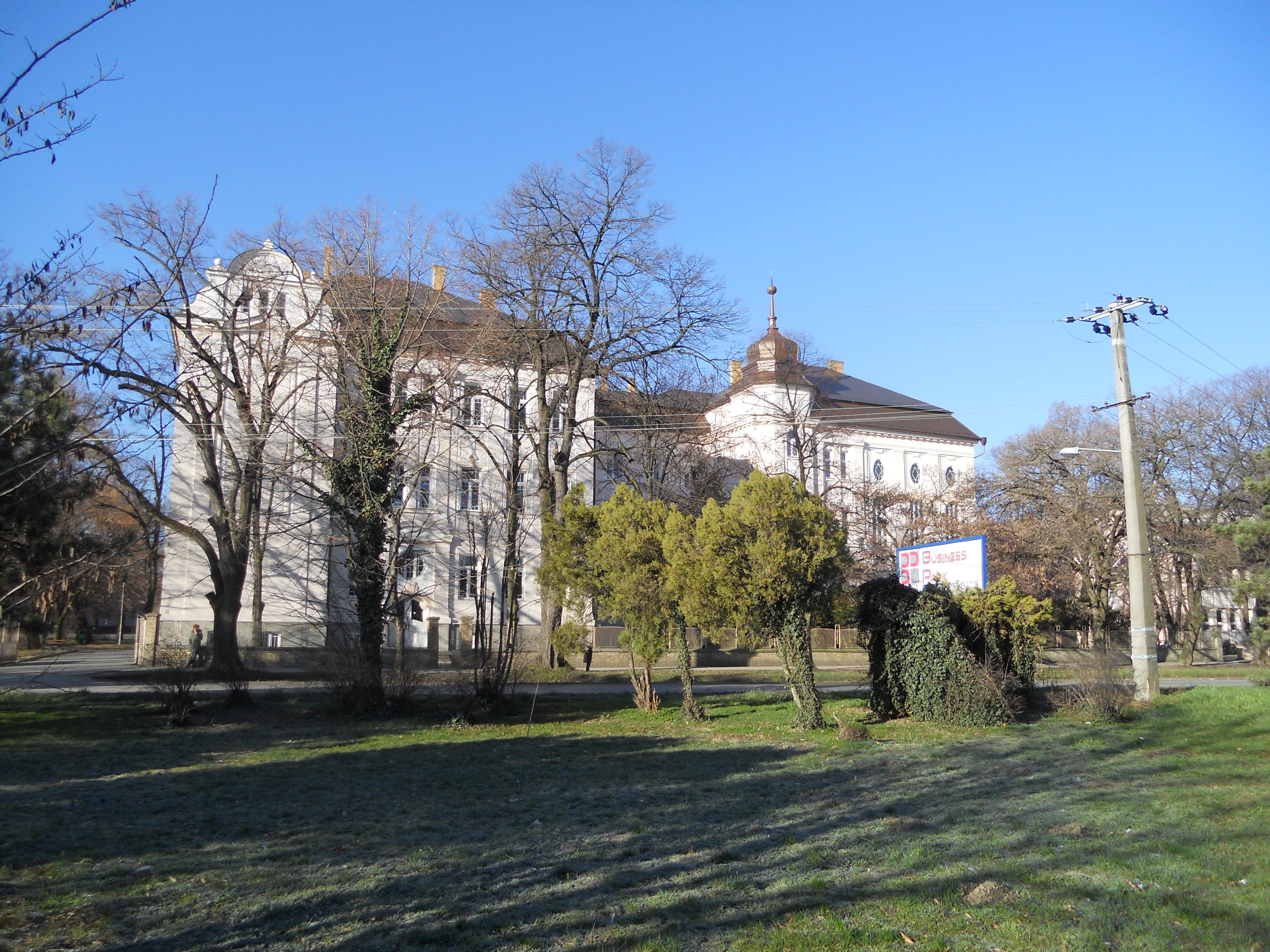

Location
- Bački Petrovac, Vojvodina; Serbia
- Coordinates: 45.3565°N 19.5949°E

Information
- Type: public school
- Established: 1919; 107 years ago
- Campus: Urban
- Website: www.jankollar.org

The Ján Kollár Gymnasium and Students' Home (Serbian: Гимназија ″Јан Колар″ са домом ученика, Gimnazija ″Jan Kolar″ sa domom učenika; Slovak: Gymnázium Jána Kollára so žiackym domovom) in Bački Petrovac in Vojvodina, Serbia, founded in 1919, is a public coeducational high school (gymnasium, similar to preparatory school) serving primarily communities of Slovaks in Serbia and the rest of the former Yugoslavia region. Initially established by the Lutheran priests Samuel Štarke and Julius Kubanyi, the gymnasium overcame early challenges, including the threat of closure due to lack of infrastructure, by constructing its building through voluntary contributions and support from Czechoslovakia and overseas Slovaks. The institution experienced growth in the interwar period in the Kingdom of Yugoslavia, developing educational facilities and a library. During World War II in Yugoslavia, it served as a resistance center against fascism despite being formally closed. In the post-war period, the gymnasium saw a significant increase in student enrolment, founded a boarding school, and opened a Slovak teacher training school. In 1969, the first Serbian language department opened, and the school was renamed after Slovak poet Jan Kolar. The Students' Home section of the institution was opened in 1997.

== See also ==
- Slovaks in Serbia
- Serbia–Slovakia relations
- Museum of Vojvodina Slovaks
