= Kravany =

Kravany may refer to several places in Slovakia:

- Kravany, village and municipality in Poprad District
- Kravany, village and municipality in Trebišov District
- Kravany nad Dunajom, village and municipality in Komárno District
