= Batizovský štít =

Mountain in the High Tatras

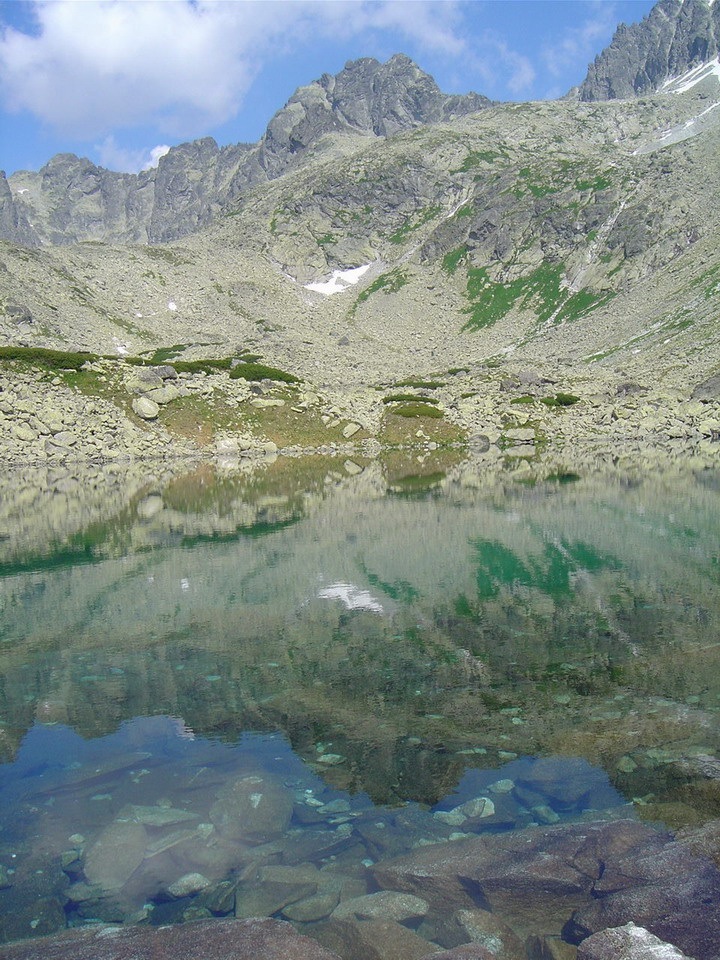

Highest point
- Elevation: 2,448 m (8,031 ft)
- Prominence: 107 m (351 ft)
- Coordinates: 49°09′55″N 20°07′26″E

Geography
- Location within Slovakia
- Location: Poprad, Prešov, Slovakia
- Parent range: High Tatras

Climbing
- First ascent: Karol Jurzyca in 1900

Batizovský štít (pol. Batyżowiecki Szczyt, ger. Botzdorfer Spitze, hung. Batizfalvi csúcs) is a 2,448 metre high double peak mountain in the High Tatras in Slovakia. Batizovský štít, just like Batizovská dolina, Batizovské pleso or the village Batizovce is named after the local 13th century aristocrat Batiz (Botiz) from the Mariáš dynasty, who used to be the owner of Mengusovská or Batizovská dolina and established the village of Batizovce.

Batizovský štít is not accessible to tourists via a marked trail, but a trail passes around the Batizovské pleso lake under the mountain. The solid rock makes it one of the best climbing spots in High Tatras containing dozens of routes in different grades of difficulty. You can however find an official tourist trail leading close to the peak, offering astonishing views to Gerlachovský štít, Končistá and Kačací štít.

== First ascends ==
Summer: Karol Jurzyca and Jozef Galko-Rusnak (1900)

Winter: Zygmunt Klemensiewics and Jezry Maslanka (1909)
