= Strabag =

Austrian construction company

Strabag SE
- Type: Societas Europaea
- Traded as: WBAG: STR; ATX component
- Industry: Construction
- Predecessor: Allgemeine Hoch- und Ingenieurbau
- Founded: 1835
- Headquarters: Vienna, Austria
- Key people: Kerstin Gelbmann (Chairwoman of the supervisory board); Stefan Kratochwill (CEO)
- Services: Building construction and civil engineering; infrastructure construction; tunnelling; facility management
- Revenue: €17,422 million (2024)
- Operating income: €1,062 million (2024)
- Net income: €828 million (2024)
- Total assets: €14,675 million (2024)
- Number of employees: 78,175 (2024)
- Website: www.strabag.com

Strabag is an Austrian international technology group for the built environment based in Spittal an der Drau, Austria, with its headquarters in Vienna. It is the largest construction company in Austria and one of the largest construction companies in Europe. The company is active in its home markets Austria and Germany and in all countries of Central, Eastern and South-Eastern Europe, in selected markets in Western Europe, on the Arabian Peninsula, as well as in Australia, Canada, Chile, China, India and Africa. In these markets Strabag has subsidiaries or operates on a project-basis.

== History ==
=== Origins ===
The business has its origins in two businesses:

- Baumeister Lerchbaumer-Isola-KG, which was founded as a craft workshop business known in 1835. The business was developed by Anton Lerchbaumer (1879–1954) and his son-in-law, Franz Isola (1901–1968). It evolved to become Baumeister Lerchbaumer-Isola-KG in 1929. In 1954 Anton Lerchbaumer senior died. Franz Isola became the sole manager of the largest private building company in Austria. In 1968 Franz Isola died and Anton Lerchbaumer junior (1913–1974) became manager of the company. The company became known as Ilbau AG in 1972.
- Strassenwalzenbetrieb was founded in 1895 and known as Strabag from 1930.

=== Holocaust profiteering ===
Strabag was one of the main profiteers of the Nazi building projects during World War II and before. It was a main contractor of Todt organisation and built concentration camps, the Westwall and Norway's Blood Road. The British Secret Service report concluded "[. . .] Enough large building firms offered their services to put the entire construction [of the Westwall, S.G.] on a voluntary basis. [. . .] Nor is there any basis later for assuming that firms in any large numbers became so reluctant to work for the OT as to make mass conscriptions of such concerns necessary. This willingness is due to the attractive profits obtainable from OT contracts."

=== Later history ===
These two businesses came under the common ownership of Bibag Bauindustrie Beteiligungs Aktiengesellschaft (subsequently renamed Strabag SE) – a company listed on the Vienna Stock Exchange – in 1998. In 1999, Strabag acquired Strabag. In the same year, the company was delisted from the Vienna Stock exchange.

In 2000, the holding company Bauholding Strabag (or Strabag SE since 2006) started a strong brand strategy throughout Europe, unifying all under the core brand "Strabag". In Austria Ilbau and Stuag merged into the new Strabag AG. The following year, the holding company became the major shareholder in German company Strabag AG, based in Cologne.

Subsequent acquisitions included Deutsche Asphalt GmbH in 2002, Walter Bau Group in 2005, a majority stake in Ed. Züblin in 2005, Adanti SpA, KIRCHNER Holding GmbH, F. Kirchhoff AG and Deutsche Telekom Immobilien und Service GmbH in 2008.

In 2007, Strabag SE launched its initial public offering on the Vienna Stock Exchange.

In December 2013 the Supreme Court of the Slovak Republic confirmed that one of Strabag's subsidiaries participated in bid rigging cartel of construction companies (together with companies of Skanska and Mota-Engil) in 2004. Illegal conduct was associated with the tender for the execution of works for the construction of the D1 highway from Mengusovce to Jánovce in Eastern Slovakia.

In May 2022, Thomas Bull, a director appointed by the third largest shareholder, Rasperia Trading, which is owned by Russian entrepreneur Oleg Deripaska, was removed from the board to ensure compliance with the EU sanctions against Deripaska.

In October 2024, Strabag sold its 6% shareholding in GySEV to the Government of Hungary.

== Structure ==
The company is organised into the following divisions: North & West, International & Special Divisions, South & East.

== Major projects ==
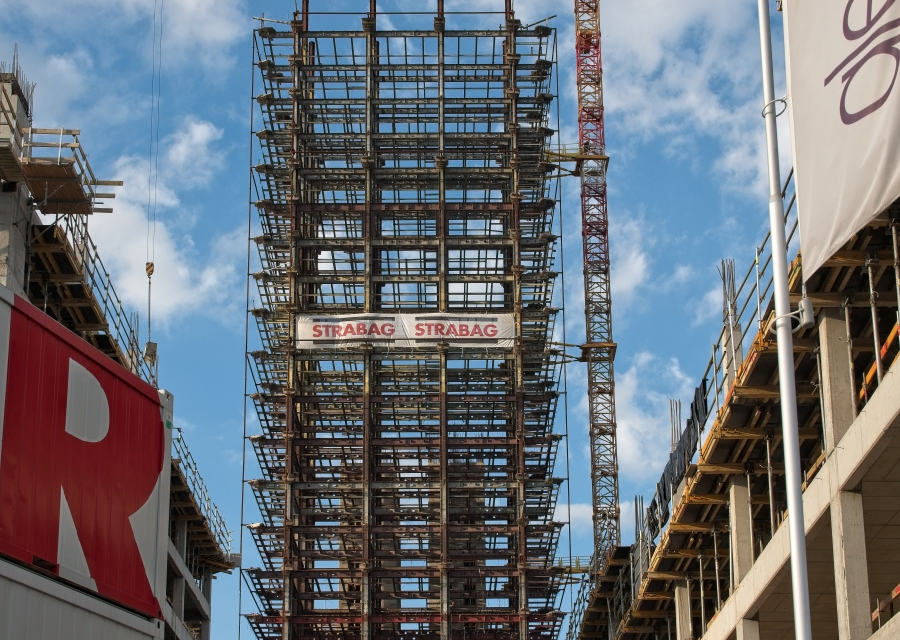
Strabag work on the Unity Tower in Krakow, Poland

Major projects have included the Alte Weser Lighthouse in the North Sea completed in 1964, Basra International Airport in Iraq completed in 1988, the Copenhagen Metro in Denmark completed in 2002, the Manapouri Second Tailrace Tunnel in New Zealand completed in 2002, the Sofia Airport Second Terminal in Bulgaria completed in 2006, the Vrmac Tunnel in Montenegro completed in 2007, the Limerick Tunnel in Ireland completed in 2010 and the Niagara Third Hydro Tunnel in Canada completed in 2013.

From 2012 to 2015, Strabag worked on the rehabilitation and extension of the Bus Rapid Transit Infrastructure in Dar es Salaam, Tanzania. Strabag is also involved in HS2 lots S1 and S2, working as part of a joint venture, due to complete in 2031.

== Shareholders ==
The largest shareholders as at April 2025 were: UNIQA Raiffeisen Group with a 31.9 % stake, Hans Peter Haselsteiner's family with a 30.7% stake and Cyprus-based Rasperia Trading with a 24.1% stake. In September 2022 the company launched a buyback program.
