= Weigsdorf =

Weigsdorf may refer to:

- Vikartovce, Czech Republic
- Višňová (Liberec District), Slovakia
- Weigsdorf, incorporated as Weigsdorf-Köblitz in Cunewalde, Germany
