= Kmeťov =

Coordinates: 49.1747°N 19.9897°E

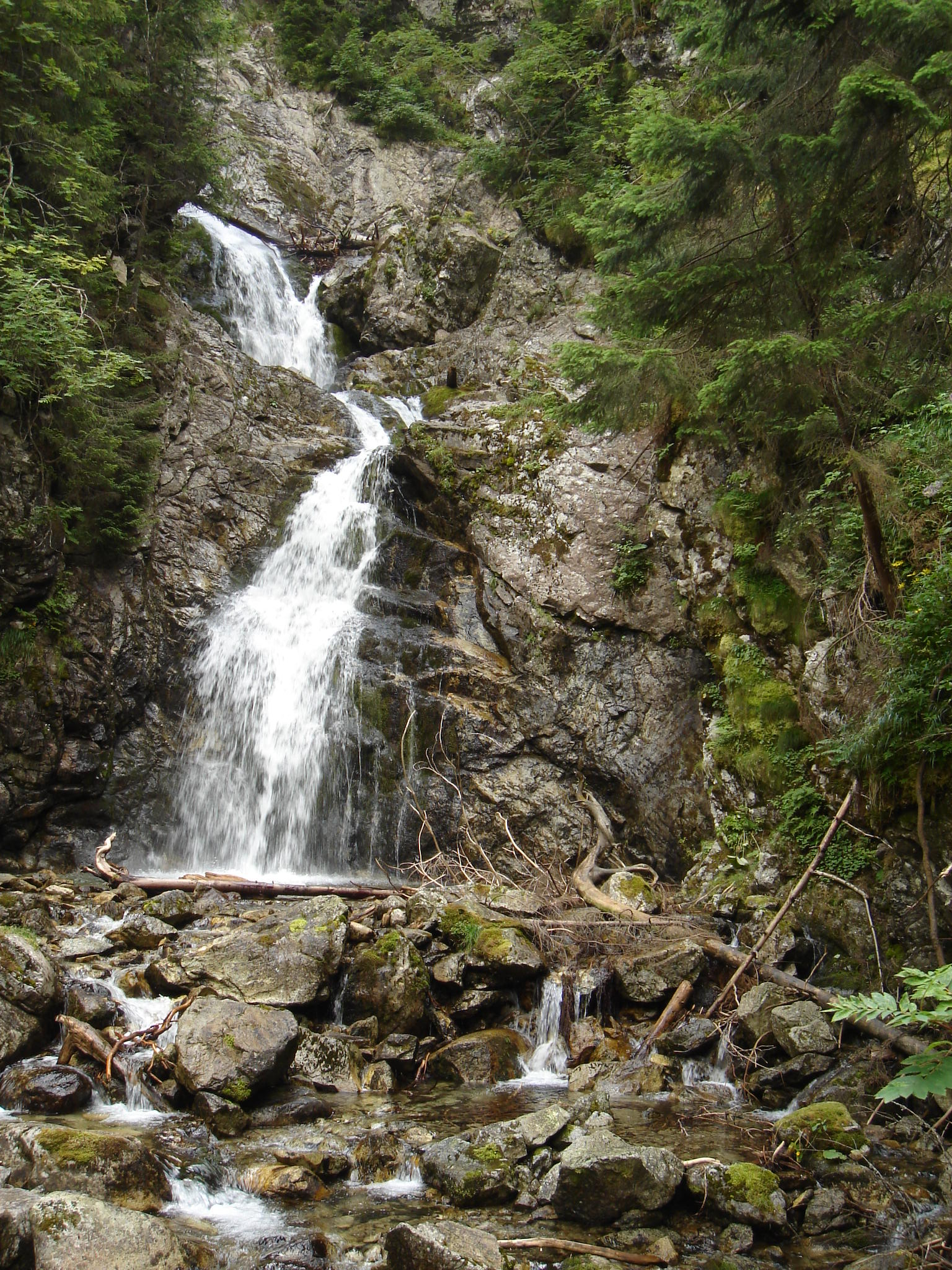
Kmeťov waterfall

Kmeťov (Slovak: Kmeťov vodopád) is glacial waterfall in the High Tatras at about 1,245 metres (4,085 ft) in Poprad District, Slovakia. At about 80 metres (260 ft) (some sources say 90 metres (300 ft)), Kmeťov is the highest waterfall in Slovakia.

== See also ==
- List of waterfalls
