= Štôla =

- Municipality
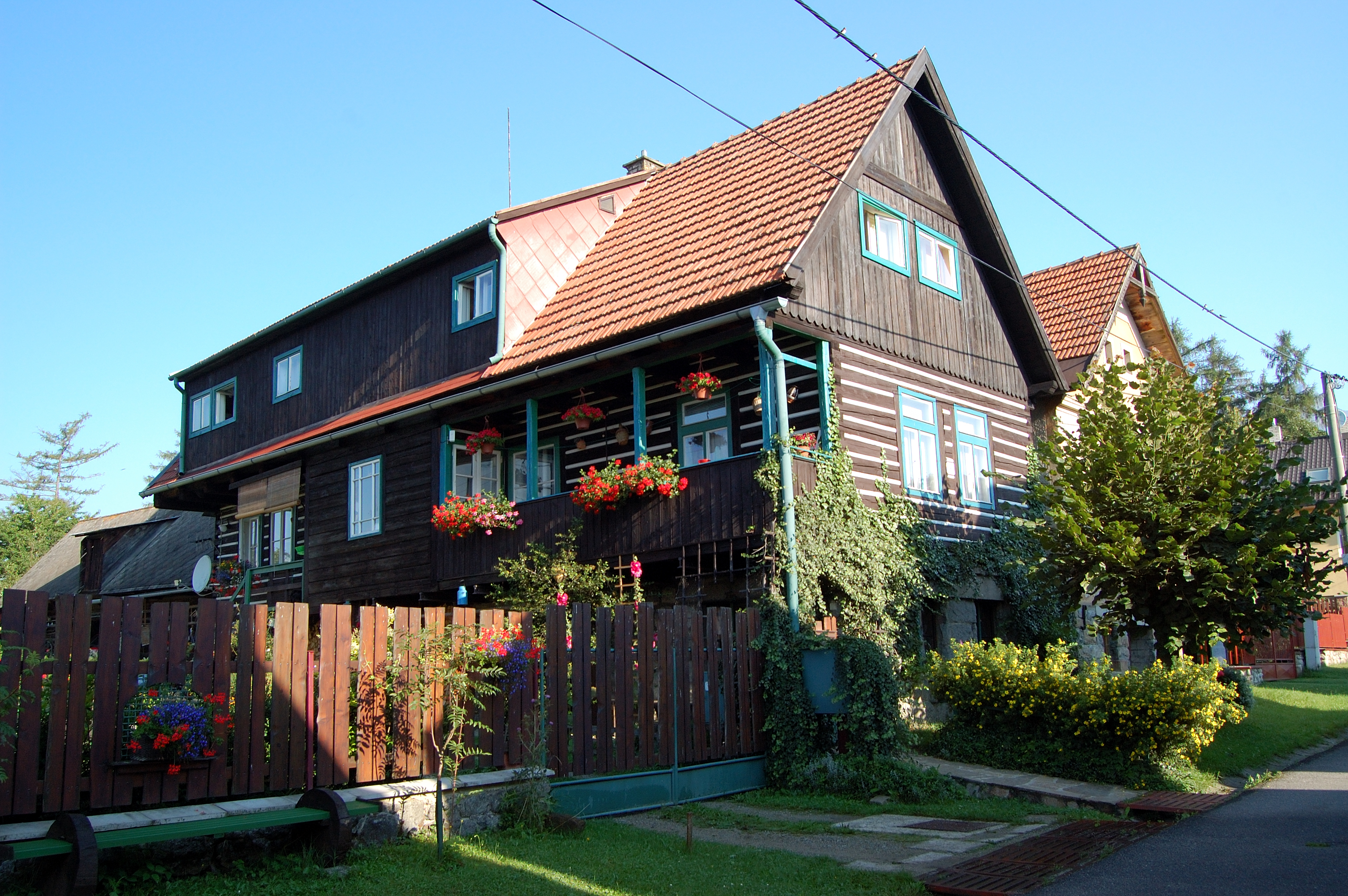

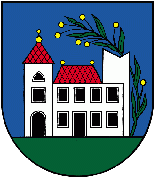
- Flag Coat of arms

- Location of Štôla in the Prešov Region Location of Štôla in Slovakia
- Coordinates: 49.09°N 20.14°E
- Country: Slovakia
- Region: Prešov Region
- District: Poprad District
- First mentioned: 1330

Area
  - Total: 2.55 km^{2} (0.98 sq mi)
- Elevation: 853 m (2,799 ft)

Population (2025)
  - Total: 515
- Time zone: UTC+1 (CET)
  - Summer (DST): UTC+2 (CEST)
- Postal code: 593 7
- Area code: +421 52
- Vehicle registration plate (until 2022): PP
- Website: www.stola.sk

Štôla (Hungarian: Stóla, German: Stollen) is a village and small municipality in Poprad District in the Prešov Region of northern Slovakia. It lies on the foothills of High Tatras.

== History ==
In historical records the village was first mentioned in 1330.

== Geography ==
The municipality lies at an altitude of 853 metres (2,799 ft) and covers an area of 2.55 km^{2} (0.98 sq mi) (2025).

== Population ==
Population statistic (10 years)
Year	1995	2005	2015	2025
Count	546	547	537	515
Difference		+0.18%	−1.82%	−4.09%

Population statistic
Year	2024	2025
Count	526	515
Difference		−2.09%

It has a population of 515 people (31 December 2025).

=== Ethnicity ===
Census 2021 (1+ %)
Ethnicity	Number	Fraction
Slovak	475	92.41%
Not found out	32	6.22%
Romani	12	2.33%
Czech	8	1.55%
Total	514	

In year 2021 was 514 people by ethnicity 475 as Slovak, 32 as Not found out, 12 as Romani, 8 as Czech, 3 as Hungarian, 3 as Other, 2 as German, 1 as Silesian, 1 as Rusyn and 1 as Bulgarian.

Note on population: The difference values of population numbers in the table "Population statistic" and in the sections "Ethnicity" & "Religion" is caused by the use of various statistical methods.

=== Religion ===
Census 2021 (1+ %)
Religion	Number	Fraction
Roman Catholic Church	180	35.02%
Evangelical Church	139	27.04%
None	95	18.48%
Baptists Church	48	9.34%
Not found out	29	5.64%
Greek Catholic Church	11	2.14%
Total	514	

In year 2021 was 514 people by religion 180 from Roman Catholic Church, 139 from Evangelical Church, 95 from None, 48 from Baptists Church, 29 from Not found out, 11 from Greek Catholic Church, 3 from Other and not ascertained christian church, 2 from Christian Congregations in Slovakia, 2 from Islam, 2 from Apostolic Church, 1 from Jewish community, 1 from Paganism and natural spirituality and 1 from Church of the Brethren.

== Economy and infrastructure ==
The village has a developed touristic infrastructure with several types and categories of accommodation. Cultural sightseeing is neo-classical evangelical church from 19th century.
