= Švábovce =

- Municipality
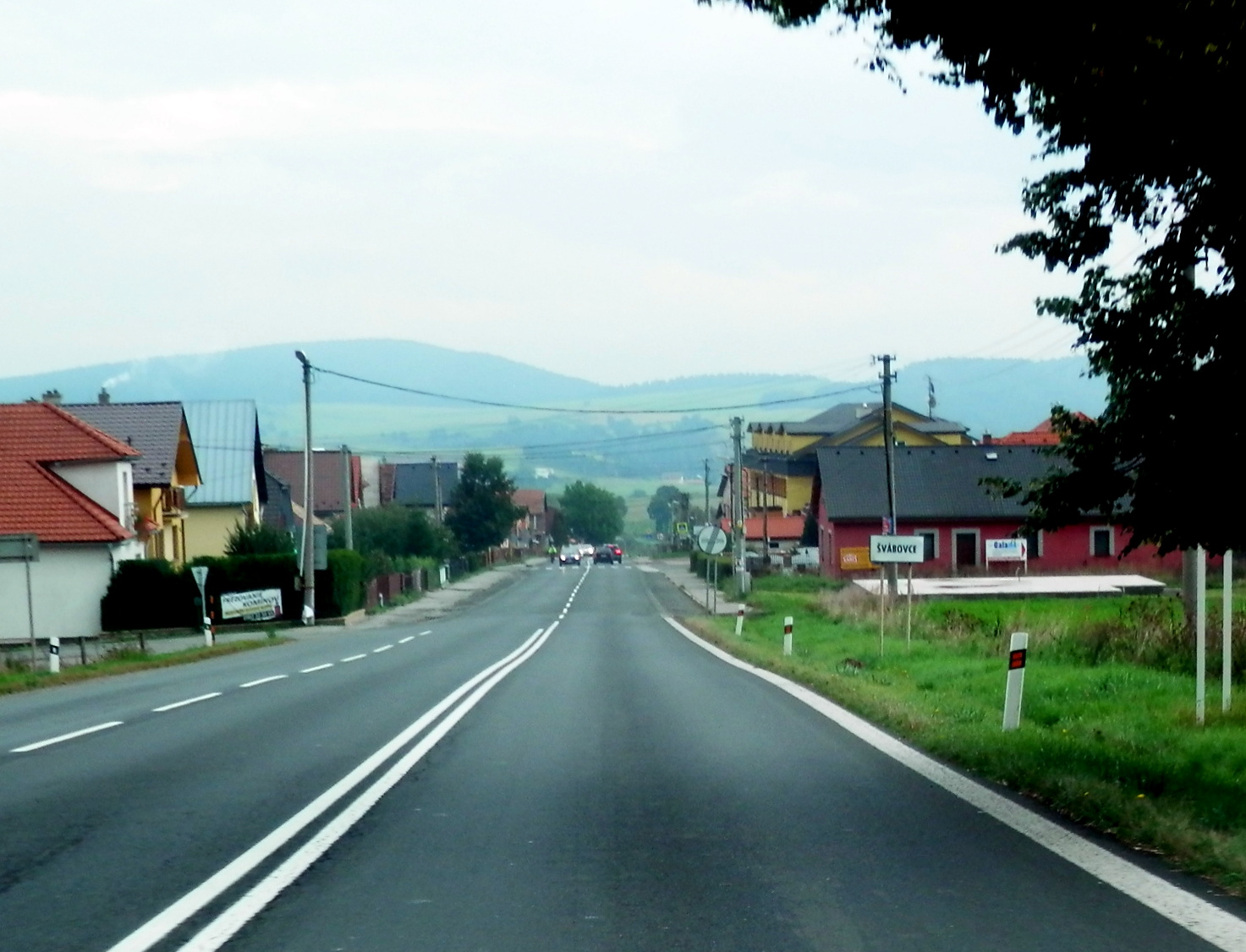

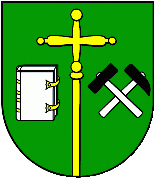
- Flag Coat of arms

- Location of Švábovce in the Prešov Region Location of Švábovce in Slovakia
- Coordinates: 49.03°N 20.36°E
- Country: Slovakia
- Region: Prešov Region
- District: Poprad District
- First mentioned: 1268

Area
  - Total: 9.06 km^{2} (3.50 sq mi)
- Elevation: 676 m (2,218 ft)

Population (2025)
  - Total: 1,692
- Time zone: UTC+1 (CET)
  - Summer (DST): UTC+2 (CEST)
- Postal code: 591 2
- Area code: +421 52
- Vehicle registration plate (until 2022): PP
- Website: obecsvabovce.sk

Švábovce (Hungarian: Svábfalva, German: Schwabsdorf) is a village and municipality in Poprad District in the Prešov Region of northern Slovakia.

== History ==
In historical records the village was first mentioned in 1268.

== Geography ==
The municipality lies at an altitude of 676 metres (2,218 ft) and covers an area of 9.06 km^{2} (3.50 sq mi) (2025).

== Population ==
Population statistic (10 years)
Year	1995	2005	2015	2025
Count	922	1109	1465	1692
Difference		+20.28%	+32.10%	+15.49%

Population statistic
Year	2024	2025
Count	1670	1692
Difference		+1.31%

It has a population of 1692 people (31 December 2025).

=== Ethnicity ===
Census 2021 (1+ %)
Ethnicity	Number	Fraction
Slovak	1528	96.16%
Romani	121	7.61%
Not found out	32	2.01%
Total	1589	

In year 2021 was 1589 people by ethnicity 1528 as Slovak, 121 as Romani, 32 as Not found out, 10 as Czech, 7 as Other, 2 as Hungarian, 1 as Ukrainian, 1 as Rusyn and 1 as German.

Note on population: The difference values of population numbers in the table "Population statistic" and in the sections "Ethnicity" & "Religion" is caused by the use of various statistical methods.

=== Religion ===
Census 2021 (1+ %)
Religion	Number	Fraction
Roman Catholic Church	899	56.58%
Evangelical Church	464	29.2%
None	130	8.18%
Greek Catholic Church	28	1.76%
Not found out	23	1.45%
Total	1589	

In year 2021 was 1589 people by religion 899 from Roman Catholic Church, 464 from Evangelical Church, 130 from None, 28 from Greek Catholic Church, 23 from Not found out, 10 from Christian Congregations in Slovakia, 5 from Other and not ascertained christian church, 5 from Baptists Church, 5 from Apostolic Church, 4 from Seventh-day Adventist Church, 3 from Eastern Orthodox Church, 3 from Other, 3 from Ad hoc movements, 2 from Calvinist Church, 2 from Islam, 1 from Old Catholic Church, 1 from Paganism and natural spirituality and 1 from Buddhism.

== Economy and infrastructure ==
Švábovce is partially a bedroom community for the Poprad. It is a modern village with ongoing construction of new dwellings. Cultural sightseeings are classical evangelical and gothic catholic churches.
