= Liptovská Teplička =

- Municipality
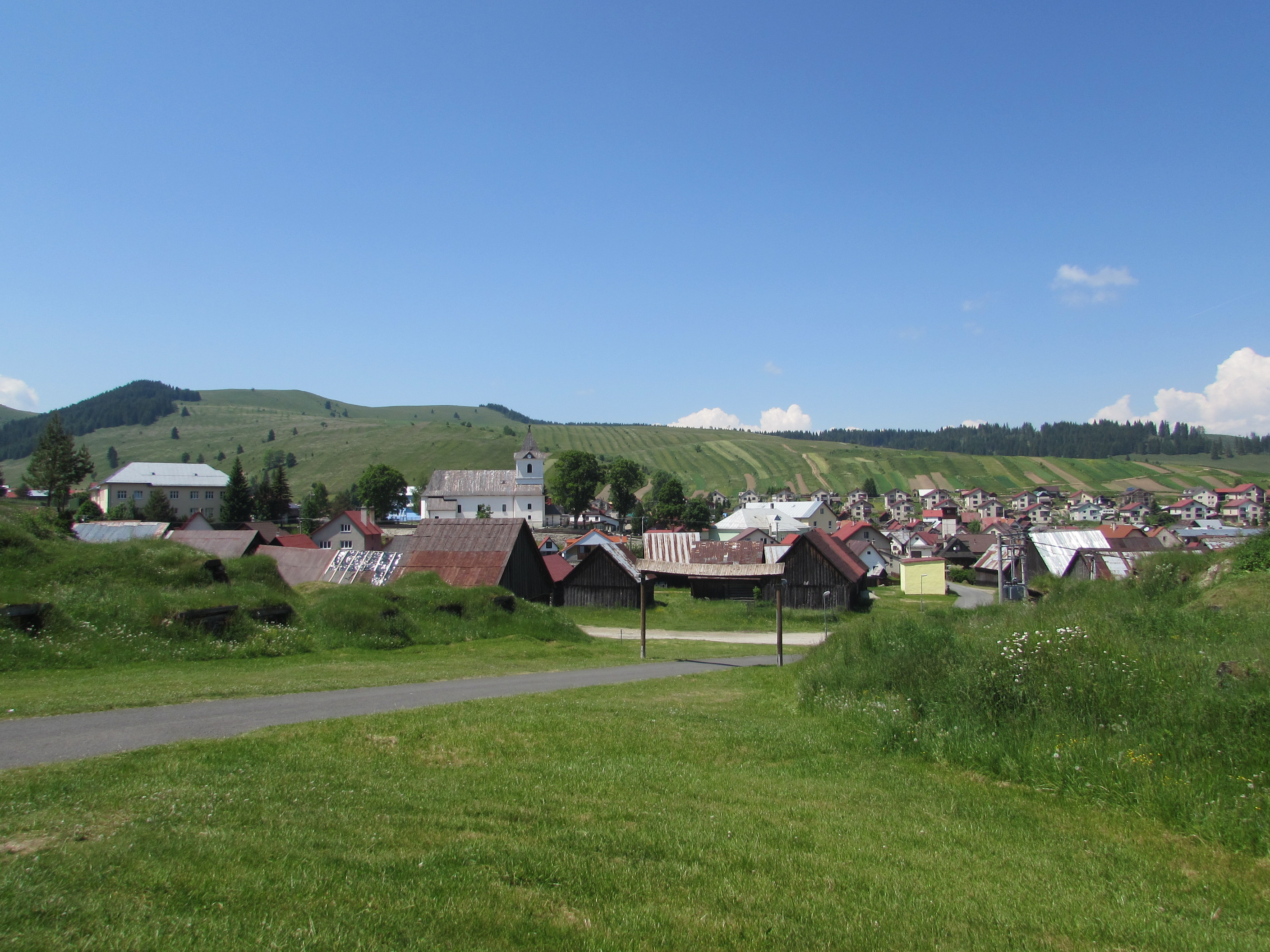

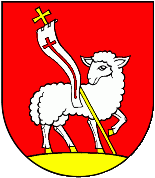
- Flag Coat of arms

- Location of Liptovská Teplička in the Prešov Region Location of Liptovská Teplička in Slovakia
- Coordinates: 48.97°N 20.08°E
- Country: Slovakia
- Region: Prešov Region
- District: Poprad District
- First mentioned: 1634

Area
  - Total: 98.68 km^{2} (38.10 sq mi)
- Elevation: 900 m (3,000 ft)

Population (2025)
  - Total: 2,364

Population by ethnicity (2021)
  - Slovak: 94.5%
  - Roma: 7.9%
  - Czech: 0.2%
  - Others: 0.5%
  - Unreported: 3.0%

Population by religion (2021)
  - Roman Catholic: 90.3%
  - Brethern: 1.3%
  - Old Catholic: 0.6%
  - Greek Catholic: 0.5%
  - Other: 1.7%
  - Non-religious: 3.1%
  - Unreported: 2.5%
- Time zone: UTC+1 (CET)
  - Summer (DST): UTC+2 (CEST)
- Postal code: 594 0
- Area code: +421 52
- Vehicle registration plate (until 2022): PP
- Website: www.liptovskateplicka.sk

Liptovská Teplička (Hungarian: Teplicska) is a large village and municipality in Poprad District in the Prešov Region of northern Slovakia.

Due to its uniqueness and successes, the village became the winner of the Village of the Year 2007 competition.

== Geography ==
The municipality lies at an altitude of 900 metres (3,000 ft) and covers an area of 98.68 km^{2} (38.10 sq mi) (2025).

== History ==
In historical records the village was first mentioned in 1634.
Settled probably before 1612 when the village Pohorelá (with that it shares the origins) was first mentioned in written records. The name Teplička (or its Hungarian transcript Teplicska) used till around 1920 when the adjective Liptovská (related to the Liptov region) had been added to distinguish it from other villages with the same name in Slovakia. A new road connecting the village with Poprad was built after World War II, and in the subsequent change of administrative divisions in 1960, the village has been integrated to the Poprad District of the then Eastern Slovakia Region, since 1996 Prešov Region. (The traditional road connecting the village with the historical Liptov region remains now inaccessible for motor cars.)

The name Teplička comes from Teplica, a small creek flowing through the village that does not freeze even in the coldest winters (teplý means 'warm' in Slovak).

Teplička is also known for its hobbit-style potato cellars, that are known for looking like the shire from the film trilogy The Lord of the Rings. There are around 400 cellars in the village.

== Population ==
Population statistic (10 years)
Year	1995	2005	2015	2025
Count	2186	2312	2429	2364
Difference		+5.76%	+5.06%	−2.67%

Population statistic
Year	2024	2025
Count	2362	2364
Difference		+0.08%

It has a population of 2364 people (31 December 2025).

=== Ethnicity ===
Census 2021 (1+%)
Ethnicity	Number	Fraction
Slovak	2272	94.46%
Romani	190	7.9%
Not found out	72	2.99%
Total	2405	

In year 2021 was 2405 people by ethnicity 2272 as Slovak, 190 as Romani, 72 as Not found out, 6 as Czech, 4 as Rusyn, 2 as Polish, 2 as Hungarian, 1 as Irish, 1 as Canadian and 1 as Other.

Note on population: The difference values of population numbers in the table "Population statistic" and in the sections "Ethnicity" & "Religion" is caused by the use of various statistical methods.

=== Religion ===
Census 2021 (1+%)
Religion	Number	Fraction
Roman Catholic Church	2172	90.31%
None	75	3.12%
Not found out	59	2.45%
Christian Congregations in Slovakia	32	1.33%
Total	2405	

In year 2021 was 2405 people by religion 2172 from Roman Catholic Church, 75 from None, 59 from Not found out, 32 from Christian Congregations in Slovakia, 15 from Old Catholic Church, 12 from Greek Catholic Church, 9 from Apostolic Church, 8 from Calvinist Church, 7 from Evangelical Church, 5 from Other and not ascertained christian church, 4 from Other, 4 from Ad hoc movements, 2 from Eastern Orthodox Church and 1 from Jehovah's Witnesses.
