= Gánovce =

- Municipality
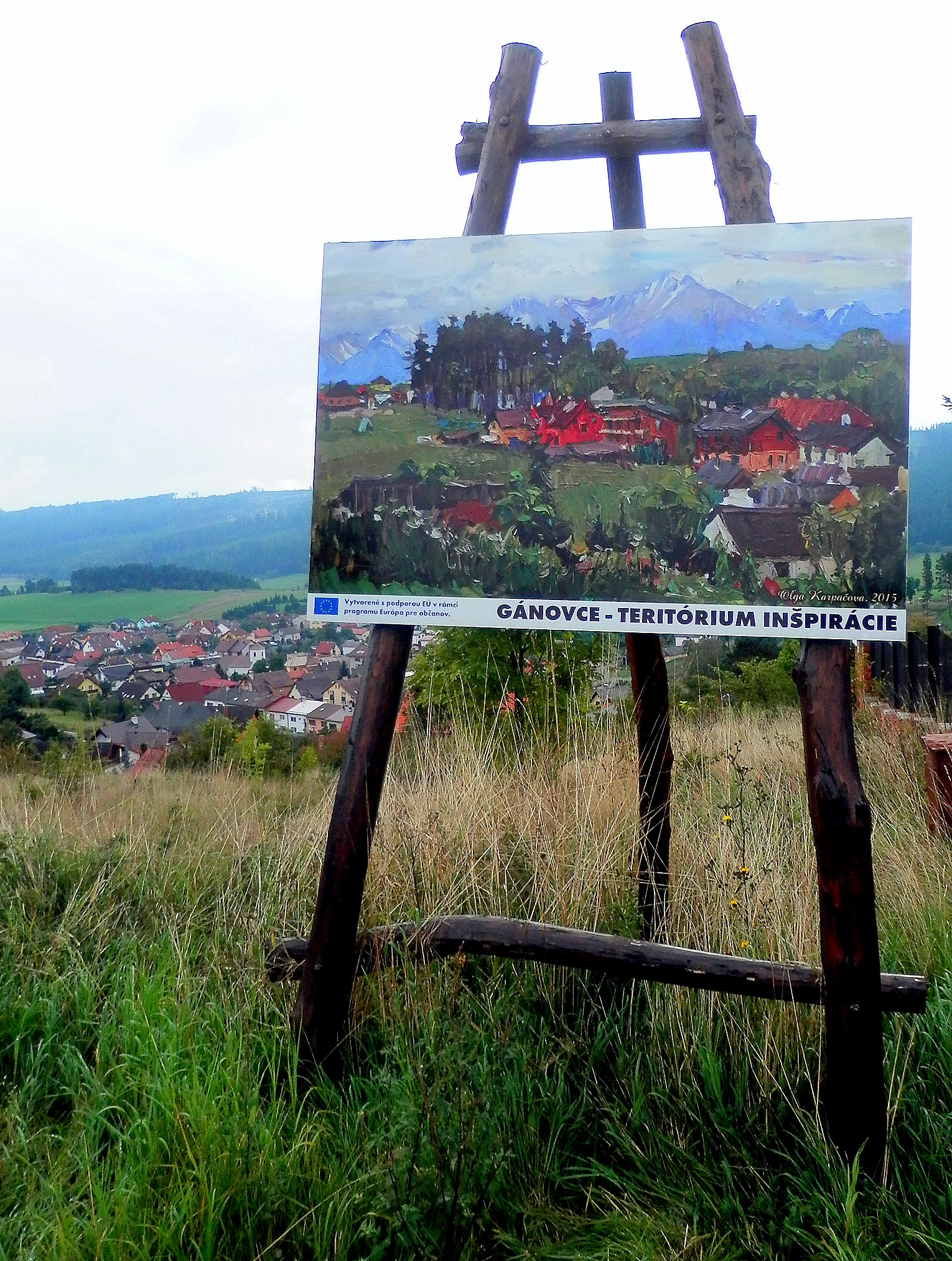

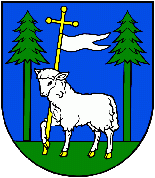
- Flag Coat of arms

- Location of Gánovce in the Prešov Region Location of Gánovce in Slovakia
- Coordinates: 49.03°N 20.32°E
- Country: Slovakia
- Region: Prešov Region
- District: Poprad District
- First mentioned: 1317

Government
  - Mayor: Alžbeta Čekovská

Area
  - Total: 7.82 km^{2} (3.02 sq mi)
- Elevation: 642 m (2,106 ft)

Population (2025)
  - Total: 1,416
- Time zone: UTC+1 (CET)
  - Summer (DST): UTC+2 (CEST)
- Postal code: 580 1
- Area code: +421 52
- Vehicle registration plate (until 2022): PP
- Website: ganovce.sk

Gánovce is a village in the Poprad District of the Prešov Region in northern Slovakia, situated 3 km south-east from the town of Poprad.

== Geography ==
The municipality lies at an altitude of 642 metres (2,106 ft) and covers an area of 7.82 km^{2} (3.02 sq mi) (2025).

== History ==
Gánovce was mentioned for the first time in written records in 1317 as "villa Ganau". However, the church in Gánovce is older, dated to the 13th century and the settlement called Filice (originally a separate village, but united with Gánovce in 1924) was already mentioned in 1236. Gánovce was inhabited by the Spiš spearmen, who enjoyed a higher social and legal status than ordinary peasants from the neighboring villages. Historical names of the village are Ganowcze, Gansdorf and Ganóc. The village was best known for its healing hot springs, already mentioned in 1549, and a spa existed there until 1992.

== Climate ==
Climate data for Gánovce (1991−2020)
Month	Jan	Feb	Mar	Apr	May	Jun	Jul	Aug	Sep	Oct	Nov	Dec	Year
Record high °C (°F)	11.9 (53.4)	16.0 (60.8)	19.6 (67.3)	27.5 (81.5)	29.6 (85.3)	31.5 (88.7)	33.7 (92.7)	33.1 (91.6)	31.9 (89.4)	24.7 (76.5)	18.5 (65.3)	12.2 (54.0)	33.7 (92.7)
Mean daily maximum °C (°F)	0.2 (32.4)	2.3 (36.1)	6.9 (44.4)	13.2 (55.8)	17.8 (64.0)	21.2 (70.2)	23.1 (73.6)	23.4 (74.1)	18.0 (64.4)	12.5 (54.5)	6.2 (43.2)	0.8 (33.4)	12.1 (53.8)
Daily mean °C (°F)	−3.7 (25.3)	−2.1 (28.2)	1.6 (34.9)	7.3 (45.1)	12.1 (53.8)	15.6 (60.1)	17.2 (63.0)	16.9 (62.4)	12.1 (53.8)	7.3 (45.1)	2.4 (36.3)	−2.7 (27.1)	7.0 (44.6)
Mean daily minimum °C (°F)	−7.4 (18.7)	−6.1 (21.0)	−2.7 (27.1)	1.7 (35.1)	6.3 (43.3)	9.7 (49.5)	11.3 (52.3)	10.9 (51.6)	7.0 (44.6)	3.0 (37.4)	−0.8 (30.6)	−5.9 (21.4)	2.3 (36.1)
Record low °C (°F)	−24.7 (−12.5)	−26.7 (−16.1)	−21.3 (−6.3)	−10.7 (12.7)	−5.2 (22.6)	0.7 (33.3)	2.4 (36.3)	1.5 (34.7)	−2.0 (28.4)	−10.2 (13.6)	−16.6 (2.1)	−24.3 (−11.7)	−26.7 (−16.1)
Average precipitation mm (inches)	17.6 (0.69)	22.9 (0.90)	24.8 (0.98)	45.9 (1.81)	81.9 (3.22)	88.7 (3.49)	110.9 (4.37)	80.6 (3.17)	58.5 (2.30)	50.1 (1.97)	35.1 (1.38)	22.0 (0.87)	638.8 (25.15)
Average precipitation days (≥ 1.0 mm)	4.7	5.0	5.4	7.8	10.3	10.7	11.0	8.4	7.0	6.9	5.9	5.2	88.3
Average snowy days	13.7	12.7	10.8	3.7	0.2	0.0	0.0	0.0	0.1	1.7	6.6	11.1	60.6
Average relative humidity (%)	82.8	78.7	73.3	66.3	69.2	71.3	71.5	71.9	75.4	79.1	85.3	85.2	75.7
Mean monthly sunshine hours	89.2	109.1	166.4	196.3	234.6	240.9	249.7	248.6	182.3	144.0	90.3	73.7	2,025.1
Source: NOAA

== Population ==
Population statistic (10 years)
Year	1995	2005	2015	2025
Count	805	1096	1357	1416
Difference		+36.14%	+23.81%	+4.34%

Population statistic
Year	2024	2025
Count	1408	1416
Difference		+0.56%

It has a population of 1416 people (31 December 2025).

=== Ethnicity ===
Census 2021 (1+ %)
Ethnicity	Number	Fraction
Slovak	1260	89.74%
Not found out	108	7.69%
Romani	66	4.7%
Total	1404	

In year 2021 was 1404 people by ethnicity 1260 as Slovak, 108 as Not found out, 66 as Romani, 13 as Czech, 12 as Rusyn, 3 as Irish, 3 as Russian, 2 as Ukrainian, 2 as Other, 1 as Italian, 1 as Romanian and 1 as German.

Note on population: The difference values of population numbers in the table "Population statistic" and in the sections "Ethnicity" & "Religion" is caused by the use of various statistical methods.

=== Religion ===
Census 2021 (1+ %)
Religion	Number	Fraction
Roman Catholic Church	747	53.21%
None	295	21.01%
Evangelical Church	148	10.54%
Not found out	105	7.48%
Greek Catholic Church	36	2.56%
Christian Congregations in Slovakia	34	2.42%
Total	1404	

In year 2021 was 1404 people by religion 747 from Roman Catholic Church, 295 from None, 148 from Evangelical Church, 105 from Not found out, 36 from Greek Catholic Church, 34 from Christian Congregations in Slovakia, 13 from Apostolic Church, 6 from Jehovah's Witnesses, 5 from Eastern Orthodox Church, 3 from Other, 3 from United Methodist Church, 3 from Buddhism, 3 from Ad hoc movements, 1 from Old Catholic Church, 1 from Calvinist Church and 1 from Paganism and natural spirituality.

== Landmarks ==
The church, built in the early-Gothic style (13th century), features Gothic frescoes from the 14th century, a Gothic wooden altar (from 1500), a Baroque altar, and two ancient bells (14th and 18th century).

The travertine rocks near the village are an important archaeological site, in which a skull of a neanderthal man and remnants of prehistoric animals have been found. The neanderthal skull is a casting of brain cavity, dating from 100,000 years ago and was found in 1926. The original is now deposited at the Czech National Museum in Prague and a copy is found in the Slovak National Museum at the Bratislava Castle. An exhibition dedicated to the "Man of Gánovce" also known as Ganovsky Man is in a museum in Poprad.

== See also ==
- List of municipalities and towns in Slovakia

== Genealogical resources ==
The records for genealogical research are available at the state archive "Statny Archiv in Levoca, Slovakia"

- Roman Catholic church records (births/marriages/deaths): 1731–1896 (parish B)
- Lutheran church records (births/marriages/deaths): 1710–1910 (parish B)
