= Hozelec =

- Municipality
- Flag

- Location of Hozelec in the Prešov Region Location of Hozelec in Slovakia
- Coordinates: 49.03°N 20.35°E
- Country: Slovakia
- Region: Prešov Region
- District: Poprad District
- First mentioned: 1243

Area
  - Total: 4.01 km^{2} (1.55 sq mi)
- Elevation: 683 m (2,241 ft)

Population (2025)
  - Total: 776
- Time zone: UTC+1 (CET)
  - Summer (DST): UTC+2 (CEST)
- Postal code: 591 1
- Area code: +421 52
- Vehicle registration plate (until 2022): PP
- Website: www.obechozelec.sk

Hozelec is a village and municipality in Poprad District in the Prešov Region of northern Slovakia.

== Geography ==
The municipality lies at an altitude of 683 metres (2,241 ft) and covers an area of 4.01 km^{2} (1.55 sq mi) (2025).

== History ==
In historical records the village was first mentioned in 1248.

== Population ==
Population statistic (10 years)
Year	1995	2005	2015	2025
Count	694	818	789	776
Difference		+17.86%	−3.54%	−1.64%

Population statistic
Year	2024	2025
Count	777	776
Difference		−0.12%

It has a population of 776 people (31 December 2025).

=== Ethnicity ===
Census 2021 (1+ %)
Ethnicity	Number	Fraction
Slovak	732	95.56%
Not found out	33	4.3%
Total	766	

In year 2021 was 766 people by ethnicity 732 as Slovak, 33 as Not found out, 7 as Other, 2 as Czech, 2 as Italian, 2 as Rusyn, 2 as Polish, 2 as English, 1 as Russian and 1 as Hungarian.

Note on population: The difference values of population numbers in the table "Population statistic" and in the sections "Ethnicity" & "Religion" is caused by the use of various statistical methods.

=== Religion ===
Census 2021 (1+ %)
Religion	Number	Fraction
Roman Catholic Church	440	57.44%
Evangelical Church	173	22.58%
None	103	13.45%
Not found out	25	3.26%
Greek Catholic Church	14	1.83%
Total	766	

In year 2021 was 766 people by religion 440 from Roman Catholic Church, 173 from Evangelical Church, 103 from None, 25 from Not found out, 14 from Greek Catholic Church, 4 from Seventh-day Adventist Church, 2 from Christian Congregations in Slovakia, 1 from Old Catholic Church, 1 from Eastern Orthodox Church, 1 from Other, 1 from United Methodist Church and 1 from Baptists Church.

== Economy and infrastructure ==
Hozelec is a typical touristic village in High Tatras with good touristic infrastructure. In the village is Children amusement park FunVille.

== See also ==
- List of municipalities and towns in Slovakia

== Genealogical resources ==
The records for genealogical research are available at the state archive "Statny Archiv in Levoca, Slovakia"

- Roman Catholic church records (births/marriages/deaths): 1731-1896 (parish B)
- Lutheran church records (births/marriages/deaths): 1710-1910 (parish B)
