= Vernár =

- Municipality
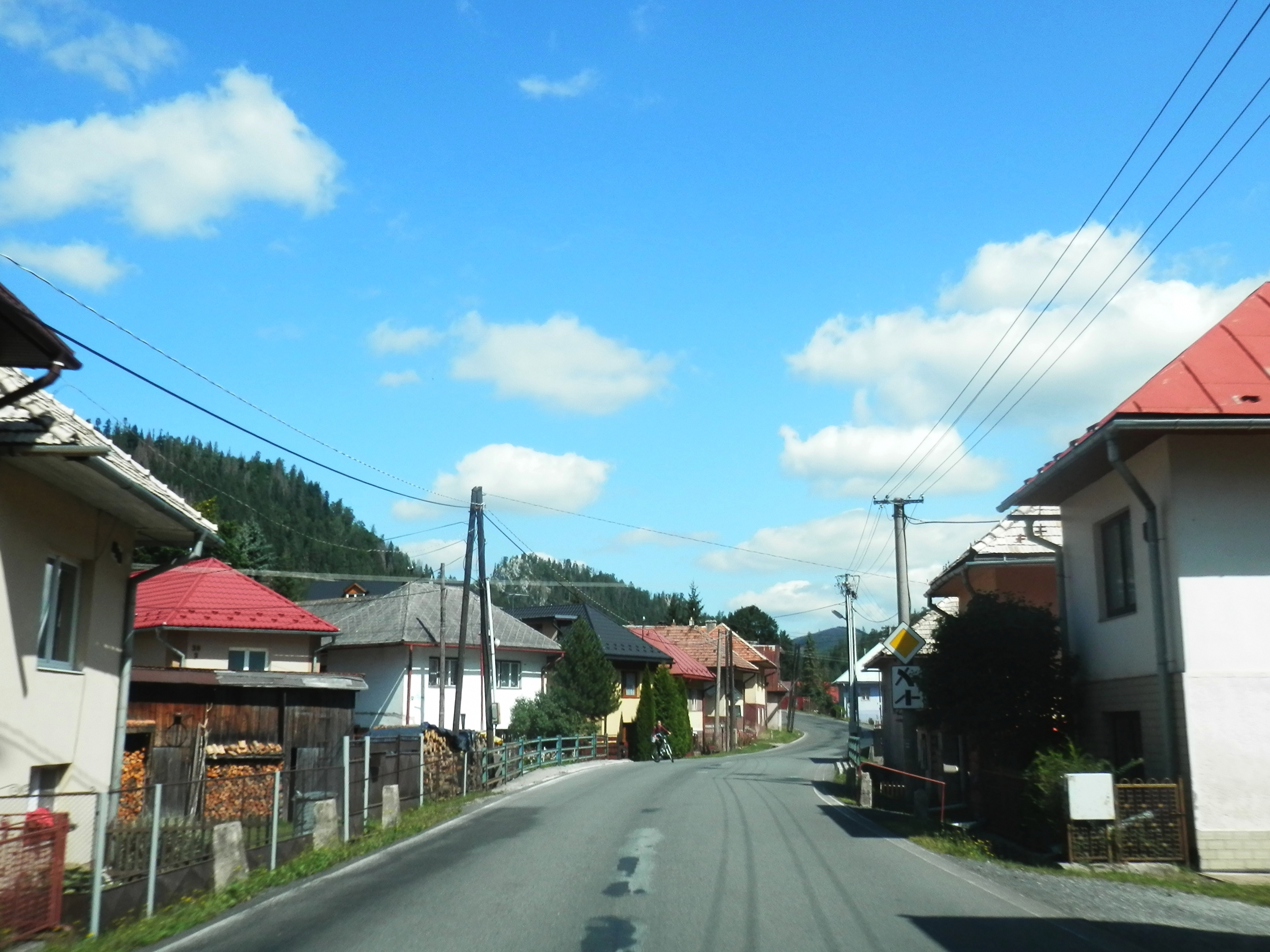

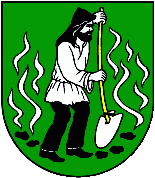
- Flag Coat of arms

- Location of Vernár in the Prešov Region Location of Vernár in Slovakia
- Coordinates: 48.92°N 20.27°E
- Country: Slovakia
- Region: Prešov Region
- District: Poprad District
- First mentioned: 1295

Area
  - Total: 52.90 km^{2} (20.42 sq mi)
- Elevation: 765 m (2,510 ft)

Population (2025)
  - Total: 545
- Time zone: UTC+1 (CET)
  - Summer (DST): UTC+2 (CEST)
- Postal code: 591 7
- Area code: +421 52
- Vehicle registration plate (until 2022): PP
- Website: www.vernar.sk

Vernár (Hungarian: Vernár, German: Wernsdorf, Rusyn: Вернар) is a village and large municipality in Poprad District in the Prešov Region of northern Slovakia. It lies between Low Tatras and Slovenský raj mountain ranges. It is Slovakia's western-most municipality with Orthodox plurality.

== History ==
The village was mentioned in the historical records for the first time in 1295. Before the establishment of independent Czechoslovakia in 1918, Vernár was part of Gömör and Kishont County within the Kingdom of Hungary. From 1939 to 1945, it was part of the Slovak Republic. On 28 January 1945, the Red Army entered Vernár and it was once again part of Czechoslovakia.

== Geography ==
The municipality lies at an altitude of 765 metres (2,510 ft) and covers an area of 52.90 km^{2} (20.42 sq mi) (2025).

== Population ==
Population statistic (10 years)
Year	1995	2005	2015	2025
Count	711	638	576	545
Difference		−10.26%	−9.71%	−5.38%

Population statistic
Year	2024	2025
Count	547	545
Difference		−0.36%

It has a population of 545 people (31 December 2025).

=== Ethnicity ===
Census 2021 (1+ %)
Ethnicity	Number	Fraction
Slovak	567	99.12%
Rusyn	11	1.92%
Not found out	7	1.22%
Czech	6	1.04%
Total	572	

In year 2021 was 572 people by ethnicity 567 as Slovak, 11 as Rusyn, 7 as Not found out, 6 as Czech, 2 as Russian and 1 as French.

Note on population: The difference values of population numbers in the table "Population statistic" and in the sections "Ethnicity" & "Religion" is caused by the use of various statistical methods.

=== Religion ===
Census 2021 (1+ %)
Religion	Number	Fraction
Eastern Orthodox Church	266	46.5%
Greek Catholic Church	157	27.45%
None	79	13.81%
Roman Catholic Church	51	8.92%
Total	572	

In year 2021 was 572 people by religion 266 from Eastern Orthodox Church, 157 from Greek Catholic Church, 79 from None, 51 from Roman Catholic Church, 5 from Christian Congregations in Slovakia, 5 from Evangelical Church, 4 from Not found out, 2 from Other, 2 from Apostolic Church and 1 from Ad hoc movements.

== Economy and infrastructure ==
There is a football club, chess club and a ski-lift area in the village. Cultural sightseeings are a classical Greek Catholic church from the 19th century and a preserved folk architecture.
