= Mlynica =

- Municipality
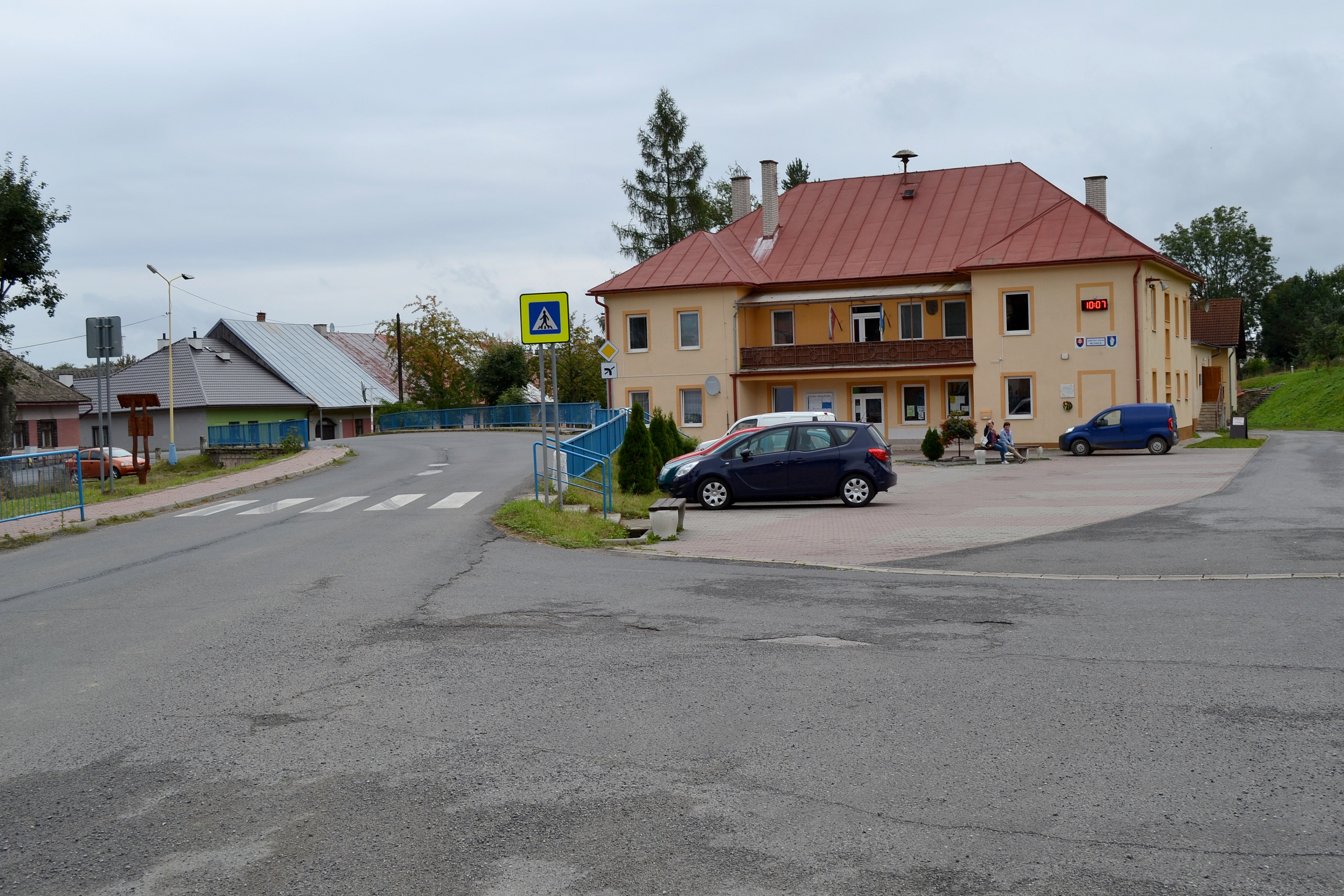

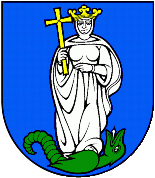
- Flag Coat of arms

- Location of Mlynica in the Prešov Region Location of Mlynica in Slovakia
- Coordinates: 49.10°N 20.31°E
- Country: Slovakia
- Region: Prešov Region
- District: Poprad District
- First mentioned: 1268

Area
  - Total: 7.65 km^{2} (2.95 sq mi)
- Elevation: 681 m (2,234 ft)

Population (2025)
  - Total: 919
- Time zone: UTC+1 (CET)
  - Summer (DST): UTC+2 (CEST)
- Postal code: 599 1
- Area code: +421 52
- Vehicle registration plate (until 2022): PP
- Website: www.mlynica.sk

Mlynica (German: Mühlenbach, Hungarian: Malompatak) is a village and municipality in Poprad District in the Prešov Region of northern Slovakia. It lies on the foothills of High Tatras.

== Geography ==
The municipality lies at an altitude of 681 metres (2,234 ft) and covers an area of 7.65 km^{2} (2.95 sq mi) (2025).

== History ==
In historical records the village was first mentioned in 1268. It belonged to a German language island. The German population was expelled in 1945.

== Population ==
Population statistic (10 years)
Year	1995	2005	2015	2025
Count	274	385	488	919
Difference		+40.51%	+26.75%	+88.31%

Population statistic
Year	2024	2025
Count	815	919
Difference		+12.76%

It has a population of 919 people (31 December 2025).

=== Ethnicity ===
Census 2021 (1+ %)
Ethnicity	Number	Fraction
Slovak	595	94.89%
Not found out	31	4.94%
Total	627	

In year 2021 was 627 people by ethnicity 595 as Slovak, 31 as Not found out, 4 as Rusyn, 2 as Czech, 2 as Other, 1 as Polish and 1 as German.

Note on population: The difference values of population numbers in the table "Population statistic" and in the sections "Ethnicity" & "Religion" is caused by the use of various statistical methods.

=== Religion ===
Census 2021 (1+ %)
Religion	Number	Fraction
Roman Catholic Church	417	66.51%
None	126	20.1%
Not found out	32	5.1%
Evangelical Church	25	3.99%
Greek Catholic Church	18	2.87%
Total	627	

In year 2021 was 627 people by religion 417 from Roman Catholic Church, 126 from None, 32 from Not found out, 25 from Evangelical Church, 18 from Greek Catholic Church, 4 from Paganism and natural spirituality, 3 from Eastern Orthodox Church, 1 from Christian Congregations in Slovakia and 1 from Islam.

== Infrastructure and economy ==
Main cultural sightseeings are romanesque Roman Catholic and classical evangelical church. Touristic infrastructure dominates village economy and the construction of new recreational facilities is in process.
