= Vydrník =

- Municipality
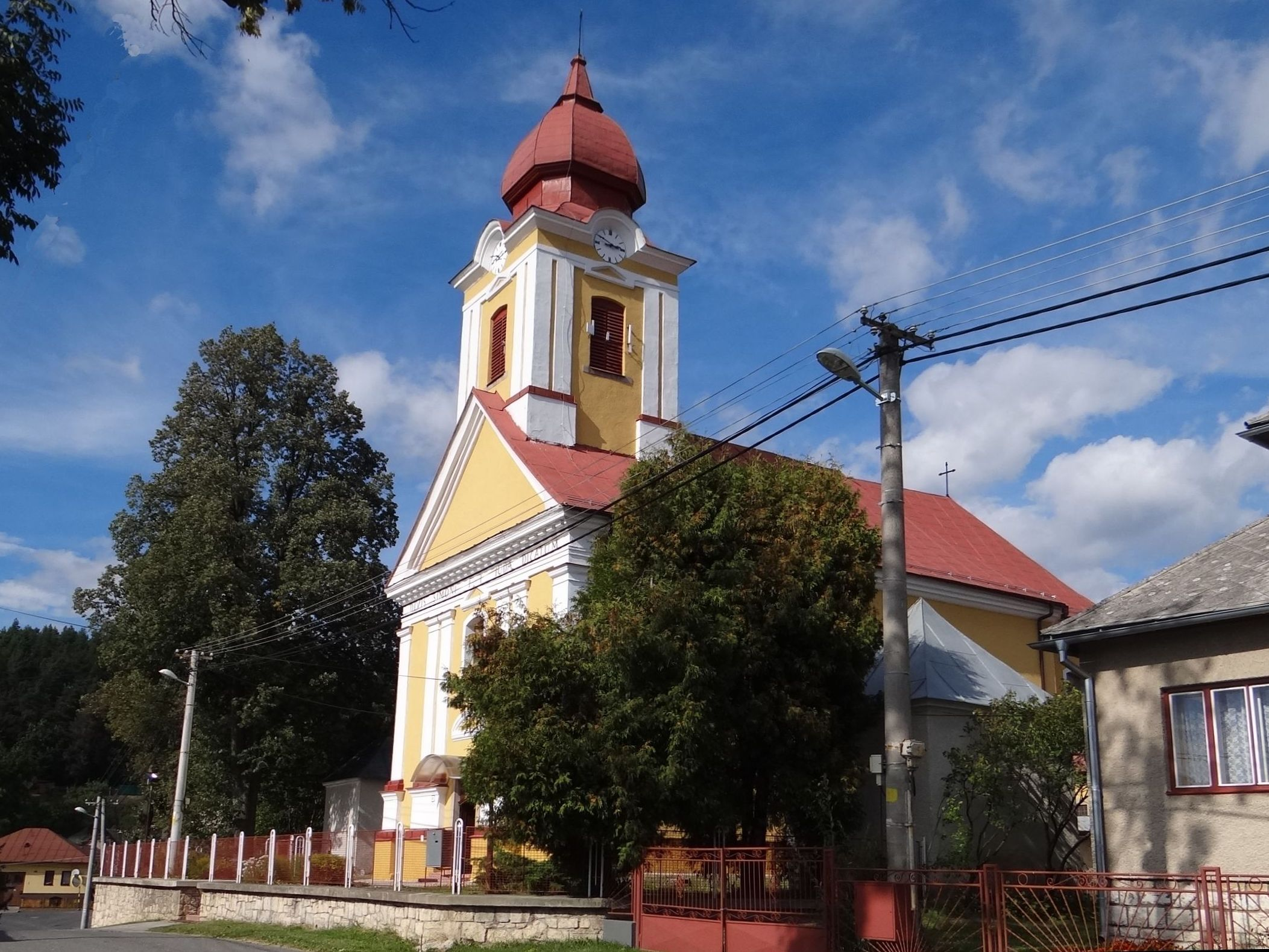

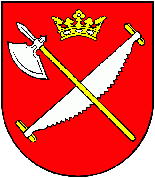
- Flag Coat of arms

- Location of Vydrník in the Prešov Region Location of Vydrník in Slovakia
- Coordinates: 49.00°N 20.40°E
- Country: Slovakia
- Region: Prešov Region
- District: Poprad District
- First mentioned: 1294

Area
  - Total: 4.96 km^{2} (1.92 sq mi)
- Elevation: 601 m (1,972 ft)

Population (2025)
  - Total: 1,365
- Time zone: UTC+1 (CET)
  - Summer (DST): UTC+2 (CEST)
- Postal code: 591 4
- Area code: +421 52
- Vehicle registration plate (until 2022): PP
- Website: www.vydrnik.sk

Vydrník (Hungarian: Védfalu, German: Wiedrig) is a village and large municipality in Poprad District in the Prešov Region of northern Slovakia.

== History ==
In historical records the village was first mentioned in 1294. It once had a lumber mill, which employed part of the inhabitants.

== Geography ==
The municipality lies at an altitude of 601 metres (1,972 ft) and covers an area of 4.96 km^{2} (1.92 sq mi) (2025).

== Population ==
Population statistic (10 years)
Year	1995	2005	2015	2025
Count	848	994	1186	1365
Difference		+17.21%	+19.31%	+15.09%

Population statistic
Year	2024	2025
Count	1343	1365
Difference		+1.63%

It has a population of 1365 people (31 December 2025).

=== Ethnicity ===
Census 2021 (1+ %)
Ethnicity	Number	Fraction
Slovak	1254	97.36%
Romani	57	4.42%
Not found out	23	1.78%
Total	1288	

In year 2021 was 1288 people by ethnicity 1254 as Slovak, 57 as Romani, 23 as Not found out, 3 as Czech, 2 as Rusyn and 1 as Moravian.

Note on population: The difference values of population numbers in the table "Population statistic" and in the sections "Ethnicity" & "Religion" is caused by the use of various statistical methods.

=== Religion ===
Census 2021 (1+ %)
Religion	Number	Fraction
Roman Catholic Church	1143	88.74%
None	78	6.06%
Greek Catholic Church	18	1.4%
Not found out	17	1.32%
Total	1288	

In year 2021 was 1288 people by religion 1143 from Roman Catholic Church, 78 from None, 18 from Greek Catholic Church, 17 from Not found out, 11 from Evangelical Church, 8 from Christian Congregations in Slovakia, 7 from Eastern Orthodox Church, 3 from Other and not ascertained christian church, 2 from Calvinist Church and 1 from Old Catholic Church.

== Economy and infrastructure ==
Part of the locals work in industrial facilities in Svit and Poprad. The cultural sightseeing is a classical church from the 19th century. Due to its train station, the village is a starting point for the tourists who spend their time in Slovenský raj mountain range.

== Railway ==
The town lies on the Košice-Bohumín railway between Spišský Štiavnik and Letanovce stations.
