= Spišské Bystré =

- Municipality
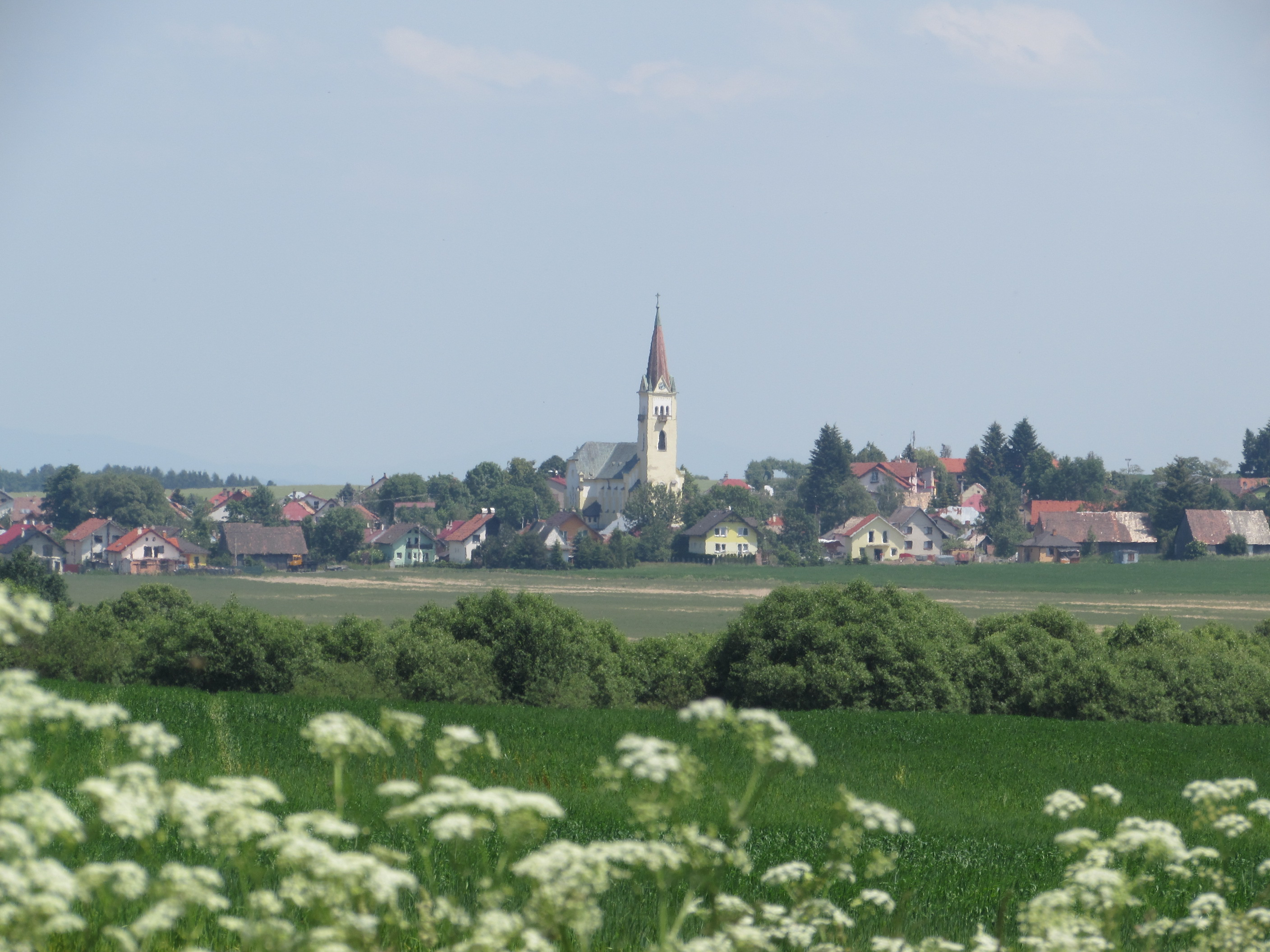

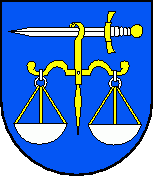
- Flag Coat of arms

- Location of Spišské Bystré in the Prešov Region Location of Spišské Bystré in Slovakia
- Coordinates: 48.99°N 20.24°E
- Country: Slovakia
- Region: Prešov Region
- District: Poprad District
- First mentioned: 1294

Area
  - Total: 38.03 km^{2} (14.68 sq mi)
- Elevation: 673 m (2,208 ft)

Population (2025)
  - Total: 2,485
- Time zone: UTC+1 (CET)
  - Summer (DST): UTC+2 (CEST)
- Postal code: 591 8
- Area code: +421 52
- Vehicle registration plate (until 2022): PP
- Website: www.spisskebystre.sk

Spišské Bystré, known officially until 1948 as Kubachy (German: Kuhbach, Hungarian: Hernádfalu) is a large village and municipality of the Poprad District in the Prešov Region of northern Slovakia.

== History ==
In historical records, the village was first mentioned in 1294.

== Geography ==
The municipality lies at an altitude of 673 metres (2,208 ft) and covers an area of 38.03 km^{2} (14.68 sq mi) (2025).

== Population ==
Population statistic (10 years)
Year	1995	2005	2015	2025
Count	2203	2376	2523	2485
Difference		+7.85%	+6.18%	−1.50%

Population statistic
Year	2024	2025
Count	2480	2485
Difference		+0.20%

It has a population of 2485 people (31 December 2025).

=== Ethnicity ===
Census 2021 (1+ %)
Ethnicity	Number	Fraction
Slovak	2391	96.45%
Romani	74	2.98%
Not found out	53	2.13%
Total	2479	

In year 2021 was 2479 people by ethnicity 2391 as Slovak, 74 as Romani, 53 as Not found out, 13 as Czech, 7 as Rusyn, 5 as Other, 4 as Russian, 2 as Hungarian, 2 as French, 1 as Polish and 1 as English.

Note on population: The difference values of population numbers in the table "Population statistic" and in the sections "Ethnicity" & "Religion" is caused by the use of various statistical methods.

=== Religion ===
Census 2021 (1+ %)
Religion	Number	Fraction
Roman Catholic Church	2054	82.86%
None	289	11.66%
Not found out	64	2.58%
Total	2479	

In year 2021 was 2479 people by religion 2054 from Roman Catholic Church, 289 from None, 64 from Not found out, 20 from Greek Catholic Church, 14 from Evangelical Church, 12 from Eastern Orthodox Church, 10 from Christian Congregations in Slovakia, 5 from Ad hoc movements, 3 from Other and not ascertained christian church, 3 from Other, 2 from Calvinist Church, 1 from Old Catholic Church, 1 from Paganism and natural spirituality and 1 from Hinduism.

== Economy and Infrastructure ==
Spišské Bystré has a football club which was established in 1934, OFK 1934 SPIŠSKÉ BYSTRÉ. In the nearby locality, Kubašok, there is touristic infrastructure which comprises a ski-lift and a couple of cottages. One of the major cultural sights is the Roman Catholic neo-gothic church of St. Michal which was rebuilt in 1926 after a fire destroyed the original building. It is located on the main square of the village on Michalská street. The local church is exceptional because of one world rarity - on the walls is the Way of the Cross, which depicts other scenes, such as those described in the Bible and officially presented in the Catholic Church, or the scenes are assigned to different Stations numbers.

== Notable Personalities ==
- Eliáš Mlynarovich, writer
- Peter Stašák, singer
- Plk. F/Lt Franišek Chmura (born 17.8.1919), pilot, member of RAF forces during WWII
- Pplk. F/Sgt Andrej Lopúch (born 12.7.19130), radio officer, shooter, member of RAF forces during WWII
