= Hranovnica =

- Municipality
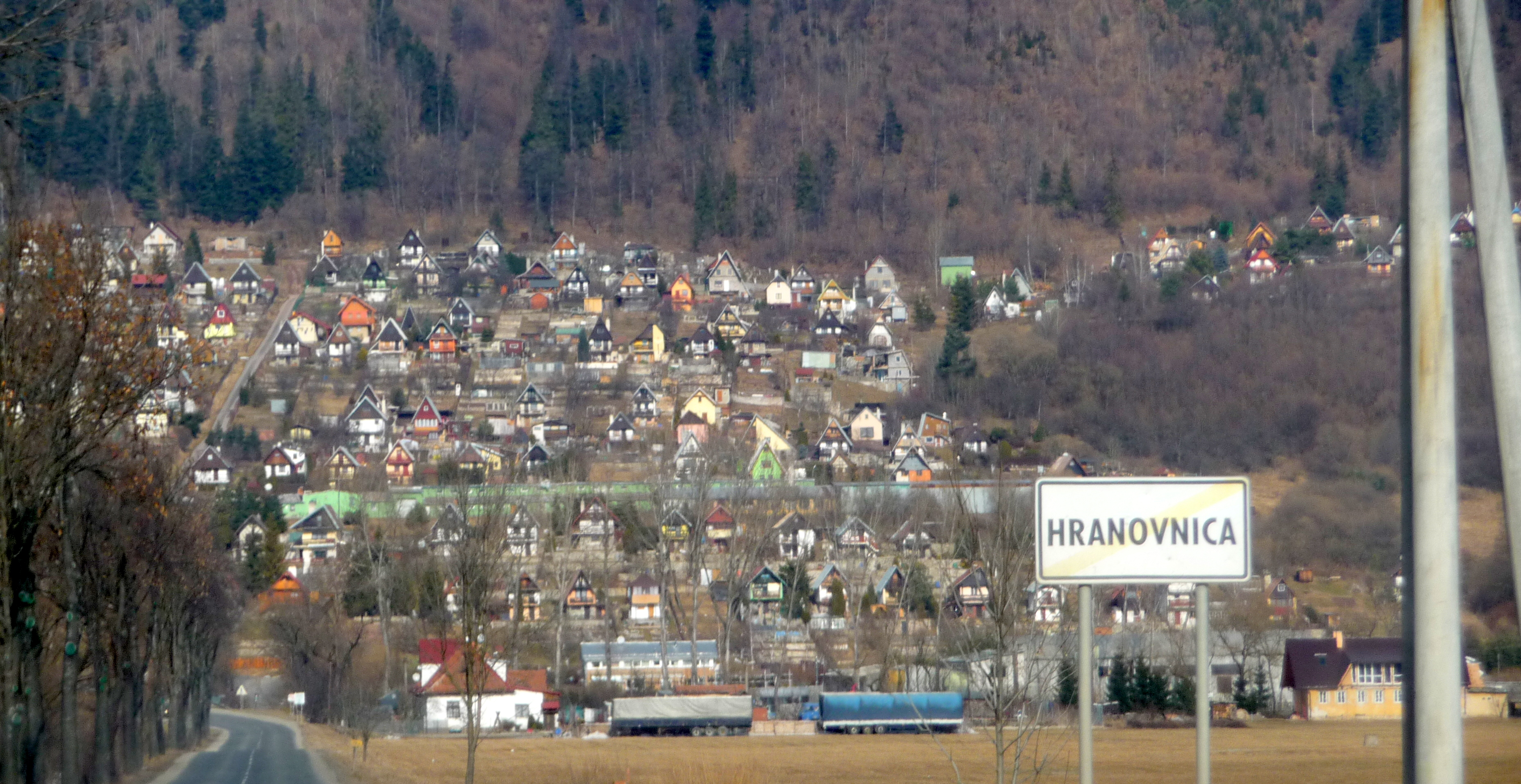

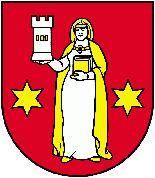
- Flag Coat of arms

- Location of Hranovnica in the Prešov Region Location of Hranovnica in Slovakia
- Coordinates: 48.99°N 20.31°E
- Country: Slovakia
- Region: Prešov Region
- District: Poprad District
- First mentioned: 1294

Area
  - Total: 32.47 km^{2} (12.54 sq mi)
- Elevation: 610 m (2,000 ft)

Population (2025)
  - Total: 3,279
- Time zone: UTC+1 (CET)
  - Summer (DST): UTC+2 (CEST)
- Postal code: 591 6
- Area code: +421 52
- Vehicle registration plate (until 2022): PP
- Website: www.hranovnica.sk

Hranovnica (German: Grenitz or Gränitz, Hungarian: Szepesvéghely) is a village and municipality in Poprad District in the Prešov Region of northern Slovakia, and the second biggest village by population in the district.

== History ==
In historical records the village was first mentioned in 1294.

== Geography ==
The municipality lies at an altitude of 610 metres (2,000 ft) and covers an area of 32.47 km^{2} (12.54 sq mi) (2025).

== Population ==
Population statistic (10 years)
Year	1995	2005	2015	2025
Count	2205	2626	3055	3279
Difference		+19.09%	+16.33%	+7.33%

Population statistic
Year	2024	2025
Count	3248	3279
Difference		+0.95%

It has a population of 3279 people (31 December 2025).

=== Ethnicity ===
Census 2021 (1+ %)
Ethnicity	Number	Fraction
Slovak	2922	92.26%
Romani	318	10.04%
Not found out	122	3.85%
Total	3167	

In year 2021 was 3167 people by ethnicity 2922 as Slovak, 318 as Romani, 122 as Not found out, 7 as Rusyn, 6 as Hungarian, 4 as Czech, 3 as Other, 1 as Italian, 1 as Russian, 1 as Austrian, 1 as Polish and 1 as German.

Note on population: The difference values of population numbers in the table "Population statistic" and in the sections "Ethnicity" & "Religion" is caused by the use of various statistical methods.

=== Religion ===
Census 2021 (1+ %)
Religion	Number	Fraction
Roman Catholic Church	2266	71.55%
None	446	14.08%
Christian Congregations in Slovakia	156	4.93%
Evangelical Church	126	3.98%
Not found out	92	2.9%
Total	3167	

In year 2021 was 3167 people by religion 2266 from Roman Catholic Church, 446 from None, 156 from Christian Congregations in Slovakia, 126 from Evangelical Church, 92 from Not found out, 27 from Greek Catholic Church, 15 from Eastern Orthodox Church, 11 from Baptists Church, 10 from Other and not ascertained christian church, 5 from Jehovah's Witnesses, 5 from Ad hoc movements, 2 from Old Catholic Church, 2 from Paganism and natural spirituality, 2 from Other, 1 from Calvinist Church and 1 from United Methodist Church.

== Infrastructure and economy ==
Hranovnica is one of the start points to Slovenský raj mountain area. The village has a good tourist infrastructure. Cultural sightseeings are Roman Catholic and evangelical churches, both built or reconstructed in classical style.

== Genealogical resources ==
The records for genealogical research are available at the state archive "Statny Archiv in Levoca, Slovakia"

- Roman Catholic church records (births/marriages/deaths): 1820–1905 (parish A)
- Lutheran church records (births/marriages/deaths): 1788–1910 (parish B)

== See also ==
- List of municipalities and towns in Slovakia
