= Končistá =

Mountain in High Tatras, Slovakia

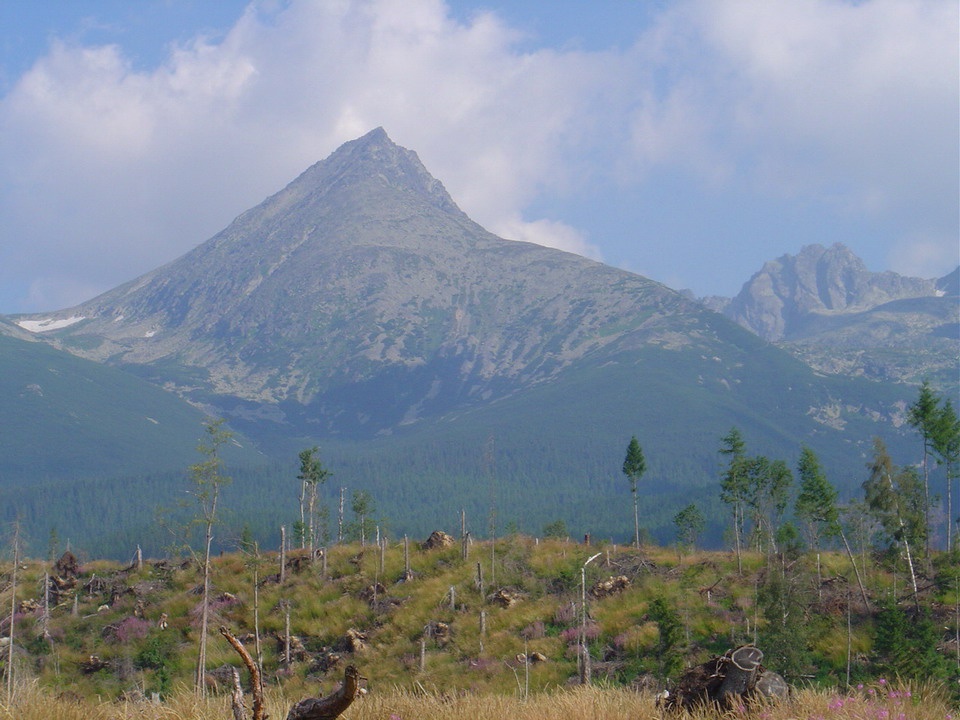

Highest point
- Elevation: 2,537 m (8,323 ft)
- Coordinates: 49°09′26″N 20°06′51″E

Geography
- Location within Slovakia
- Location: Slovakia
- Parent range: Tatra Mountains

Climbing
- First ascent: 1874 by Alexander Münich

Končistá is a mountain in the Tatra Mountains, Slovakia located approximately 15 km northwest of Poprad and rising 2,537.5 meters above sea level.

== Name ==
The inhabitants of the Tatra foothills originally referred to the mountain collectively with Batizovský štít as Hreben and Batizovský vrchom. In the 1860's, Končistá was given its own name, which describes its peak as viewed from the south.
