= Lučivná =

Village in northern Slovakia

- Municipality
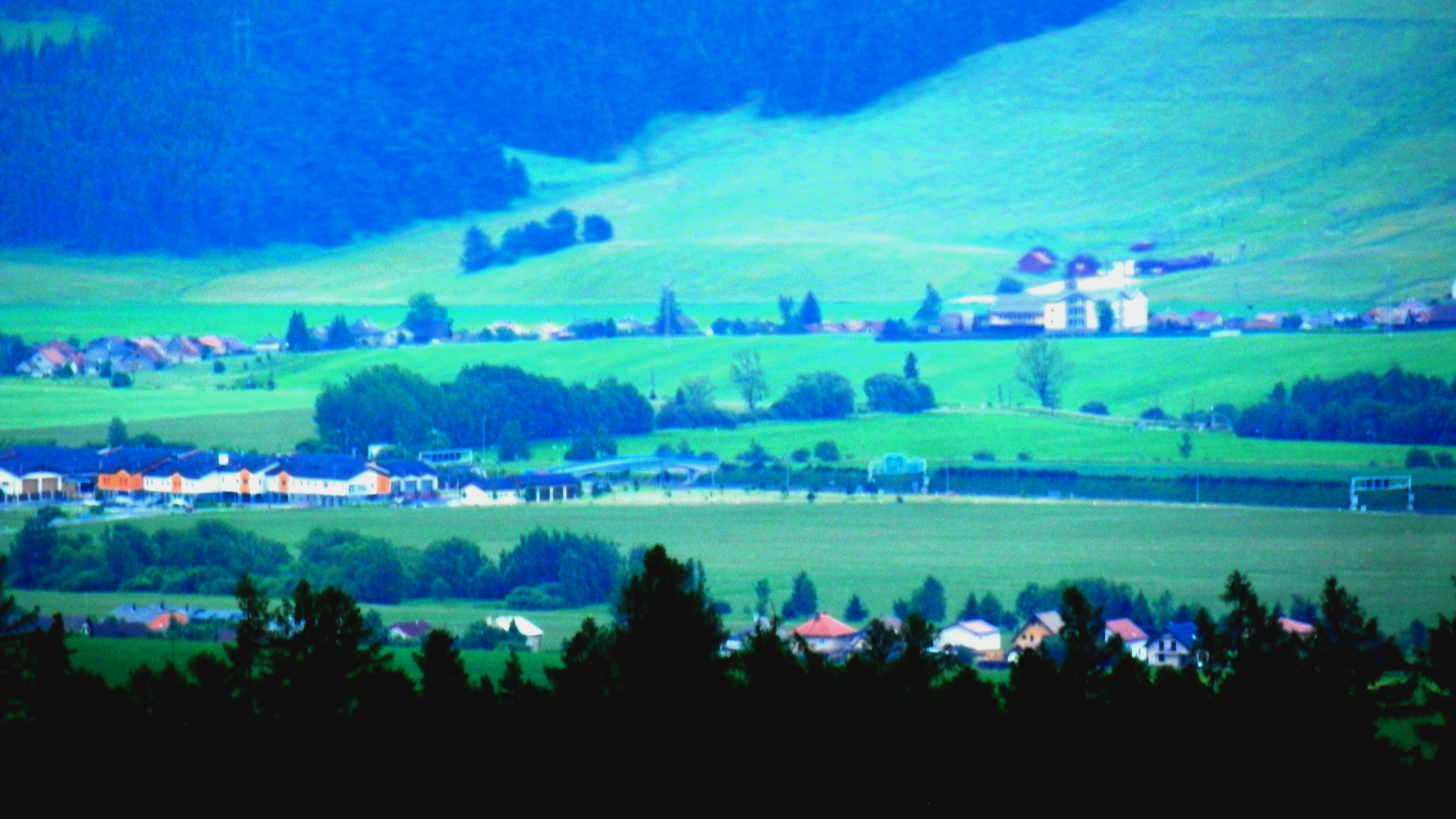

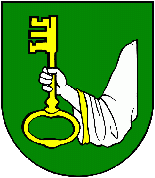
- Flag Coat of arms

- Location of Lučivná in the Prešov Region Location of Lučivná in Slovakia
- Coordinates: 49.05°N 20.14°E
- Country: Slovakia
- Region: Prešov Region
- District: Poprad District
- First mentioned: 1321

Area
  - Total: 18.76 km^{2} (7.24 sq mi)
- Elevation: 771 m (2,530 ft)

Population (2025)
  - Total: 922
- Time zone: UTC+1 (CET)
  - Summer (DST): UTC+2 (CEST)
- Postal code: 593 1
- Area code: +421 52
- Vehicle registration plate (until 2022): PP
- Website: www.lucivna.sk

Lučivná (Hungarian: Lucsivna) is a village and municipality in Poprad District in the Prešov Region of northern Slovakia. It lies on the foothills oh High Tatras. It is a small spa village.

== Geography ==
The municipality lies at an altitude of 771 metres (2,530 ft) and covers an area of 18.76 km^{2} (7.24 sq mi) (2025).

== History ==
In historical records the village was first mentioned in 1321.

== Population ==
Population statistic (10 years)
Year	1995	2005	2015	2025
Count	828	988	995	922
Difference		+19.32%	+0.70%	−7.33%

Population statistic
Year	2024	2025
Count	937	922
Difference		−1.60%

It has a population of 922 people (31 December 2025).

=== Ethnicity ===
Census 2021 (1+ %)
Ethnicity	Number	Fraction
Slovak	822	87.35%
Not found out	97	10.3%
Romani	80	8.5%
Czech	13	1.38%
Total	941	

In year 2021 was 941 people by ethnicity 822 as Slovak, 97 as Not found out, 80 as Romani, 13 as Czech, 5 as Other, 2 as Ukrainian, 2 as Rusyn, 2 as German, 2 as Hungarian, 1 as Russian and 1 as Moravian.

Note on population: The difference values of population numbers in the table "Population statistic" and in the sections "Ethnicity" & "Religion" is caused by the use of various statistical methods.

=== Religion ===
Census 2021 (1+ %)
Religion	Number	Fraction
Roman Catholic Church	545	57.92%
Evangelical Church	142	15.09%
None	113	12.01%
Not found out	85	9.03%
Greek Catholic Church	25	2.66%
Total	941	

In year 2021 was 941 people by religion 545 from Roman Catholic Church, 142 from Evangelical Church, 113 from None, 85 from Not found out, 25 from Greek Catholic Church, 8 from Seventh-day Adventist Church, 5 from Eastern Orthodox Church, 5 from Christian Congregations in Slovakia, 4 from Other, 3 from Calvinist Church, 3 from Other and not ascertained christian church, 1 from Old Catholic Church, 1 from United Methodist Church and 1 from Ad hoc movements.

== Infrastructure and economy ==
Part of the village municipality is Lopušná dolina with a lot of recreational and sporting facilities. In the village are classical evangelical and Roman Catholic churches and a manor house.
