= Hôrka =

- Municipality
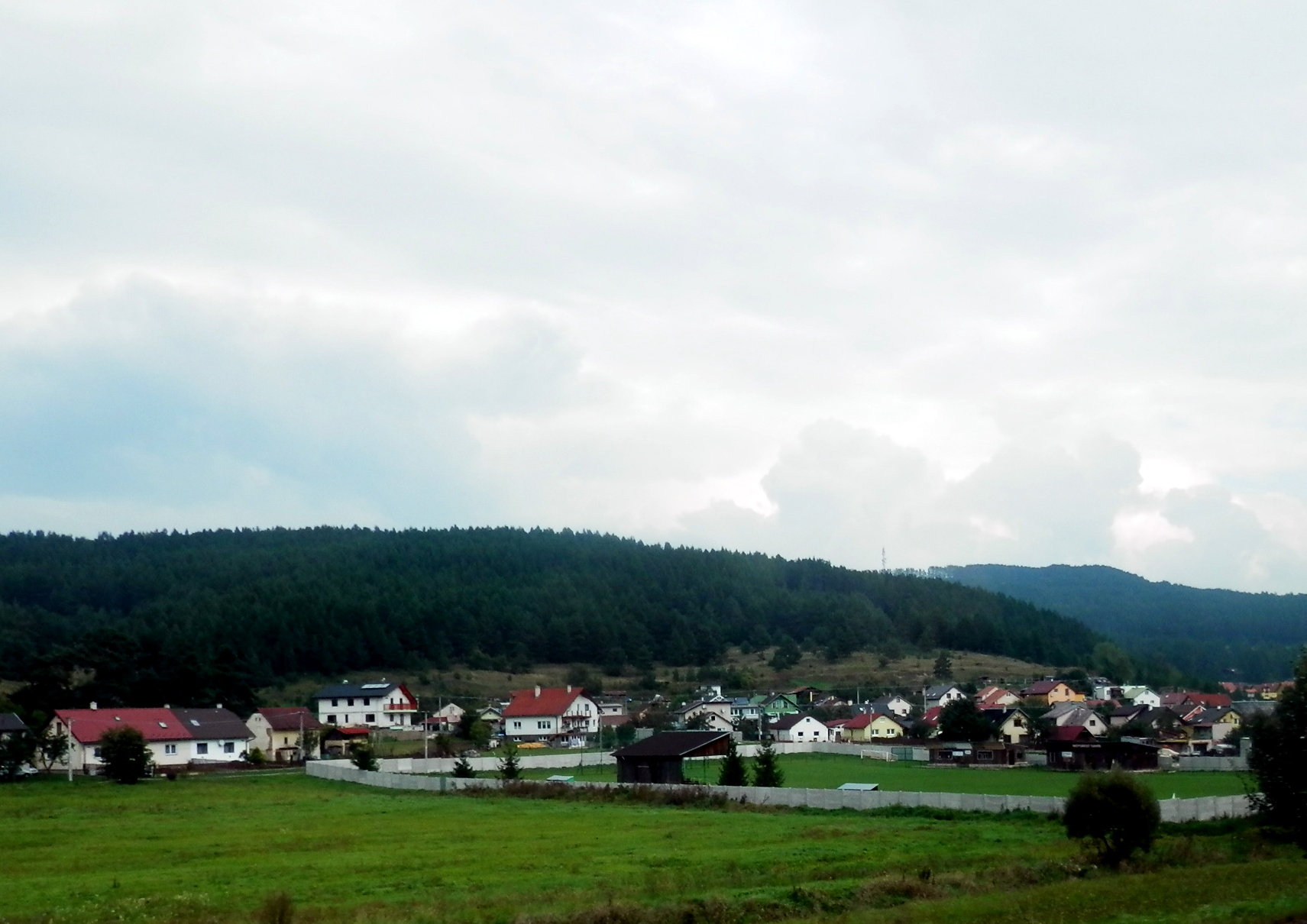

- Flag Coat of arms

- Location of Hôrka in the Prešov Region Location of Hôrka in Slovakia
- Coordinates: 49.02°N 20.39°E
- Country: Slovakia
- Region: Prešov Region
- District: Poprad District
- First mentioned: 1347

Area
  - Total: 11.35 km^{2} (4.38 sq mi)
- Elevation: 600 m (2,000 ft)

Population (2025)
  - Total: 2,165
- Time zone: UTC+1 (CET)
  - Summer (DST): UTC+2 (CEST)
- Postal code: 591 2
- Area code: +421 52
- Vehicle registration plate (until 2022): PP
- Website: www.obechorka.sk

Hôrka (Slovak pronunciation: [ˈɦʊɔrka]) is a village and municipality in Poprad District in the Prešov Region of northern Slovakia.

== Geography ==
The municipality lies at an altitude of 600 metres (2,000 ft) and covers an area of 11.35 km^{2} (4.38 sq mi) (2025).

== Population ==
Population statistic (10 years)
| Year | 1995 | 2005 | 2015 | 2025 |
|---|---|---|---|---|
| Count | 1278 | 1602 | 1914 | 2165 |
| Difference | | +25.35% | +19.47% | +13.11% |

Population statistic
| Year | 2024 | 2025 |
|---|---|---|
| Count | 2155 | 2165 |
| Difference | | +0.46% |

It has a population of 2165 people (31 December 2025).

=== Ethnicity ===
Census 2021 (1+ %)
| Ethnicity | Number | Fraction |
|---|---|---|
| Slovak | 2014 | 95.54% |
| Not found out | 81 | 3.84% |
| Total | 2108 | |

In year 2021 was 2108 people by ethnicity 2014 as Slovak, 81 as Not found out, 12 as Czech, 10 as Romani, 7 as Rusyn, 7 as Polish, 5 as Other, 3 as German, 2 as Bulgarian and 1 as Irish.

Note on population: The difference values of population numbers in the table "Population statistic" and in the sections "Ethnicity" & "Religion" is caused by the use of various statistical methods.

=== Religion ===
Census 2021 (1+ %)
| Religion | Number | Fraction |
|---|---|---|
| Roman Catholic Church | 1585 | 75.19% |
| None | 342 | 16.22% |
| Not found out | 74 | 3.51% |
| Evangelical Church | 43 | 2.04% |
| Greek Catholic Church | 27 | 1.28% |
| Total | 2108 | |

In year 2021 was 2108 people by religion 1585 from Roman Catholic Church, 342 from None, 74 from Not found out, 43 from Evangelical Church, 27 from Greek Catholic Church, 7 from Other, 6 from Ad hoc movements, 5 from Eastern Orthodox Church, 5 from Christian Congregations in Slovakia, 4 from Baptists Church, 3 from United Methodist Church, 2 from Other and not ascertained christian church, 1 from Jewish community, 1 from Old Catholic Church, 1 from Paganism and natural spirituality, 1 from Jehovah's Witnesses and 1 from Buddhism.

== History ==
In historical records the village was first mentioned in 1347.

== Economy and infrastructure ==
Near the village is a wind park. From cultural sightseeings are interesting early gothic Roman Catholic church and a baroque chapel.

== See also ==
- List of municipalities and towns in Slovakia

== Genealogical resources ==
The records for genealogical research are available at the state archive "Statny Archiv in Levoca, Slovakia"
