= Spišská Teplica =

- Municipality
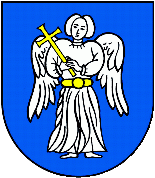
- Flag Coat of arms

- Location of Spišská Teplica in the Prešov Region Location of Spišská Teplica in Slovakia
- Coordinates: 49.05°N 20.25°E
- Country: Slovakia
- Region: Prešov Region
- District: Poprad District
- First mentioned: 1280

Area
  - Total: 31.11 km^{2} (12.01 sq mi)
- Elevation: 697 m (2,287 ft)

Population (2025)
  - Total: 2,303
- Time zone: UTC+1 (CET)
  - Summer (DST): UTC+2 (CEST)
- Postal code: 593 4
- Area code: +421 52
- Vehicle registration plate (until 2022): PP
- Website: www.obecspisskateplica.sk

Spišská Teplica (Hungarian: Szepestapolca, German: Zeplitz) is a large village and municipality in Poprad District in the Prešov Region of northern Slovakia. It lies on the foothills of High Tatras.

== Geography ==
The municipality lies at an altitude of 697 metres (2,287 ft) and covers an area of 31.11 km^{2} (12.01 sq mi) (2025).

== History ==
In historical records the village was first mentioned in 1280.

== Population ==
Population statistic (10 years)
Year	1995	2005	2015	2025
Count	1690	1939	2250	2303
Difference		+14.73%	+16.03%	+2.35%

Population statistic
Year	2024	2025
Count	2286	2303
Difference		+0.74%

It has a population of 2303 people (31 December 2025).

=== Ethnicity ===
Census 2021 (1+ %)
Ethnicity	Number	Fraction
Slovak	2167	96.18%
Romani	85	3.77%
Not found out	75	3.32%
Total	2253	

In year 2021 was 2253 people by ethnicity 2167 as Slovak, 85 as Romani, 75 as Not found out, 10 as Czech, 8 as Other, 4 as Rusyn, 4 as Polish, 3 as Vietnamese, 3 as Hungarian, 3 as English, 2 as Irish, 2 as Russian, 2 as German, 2 as French, 1 as Ukrainian, 1 as Italian and 1 as Bulgarian.

Note on population: The difference values of population numbers in the table "Population statistic" and in the sections "Ethnicity" & "Religion" is caused by the use of various statistical methods.

=== Religion ===
Census 2021 (1+ %)
Religion	Number	Fraction
Roman Catholic Church	1765	78.34%
None	276	12.25%
Not found out	84	3.73%
Greek Catholic Church	40	1.78%
Evangelical Church	39	1.73%
Total	2253	

In year 2021 was 2253 people by religion 1765 from Roman Catholic Church, 276 from None, 84 from Not found out, 40 from Greek Catholic Church, 39 from Evangelical Church, 20 from Christian Congregations in Slovakia, 9 from Eastern Orthodox Church, 8 from Ad hoc movements, 4 from Other, 2 from Old Catholic Church, 2 from Calvinist Church, 1 from Paganism and natural spirituality, 1 from Jehovah's Witnesses, 1 from Islam and 1 from Buddhism.

== Infrastructure and economy ==
Touristics dominates the village economy. In the village are several pensions and recreational facilities. Some locals work in industrial enterprises in Poprad and Svit.
