= Šuňava =

- Municipality
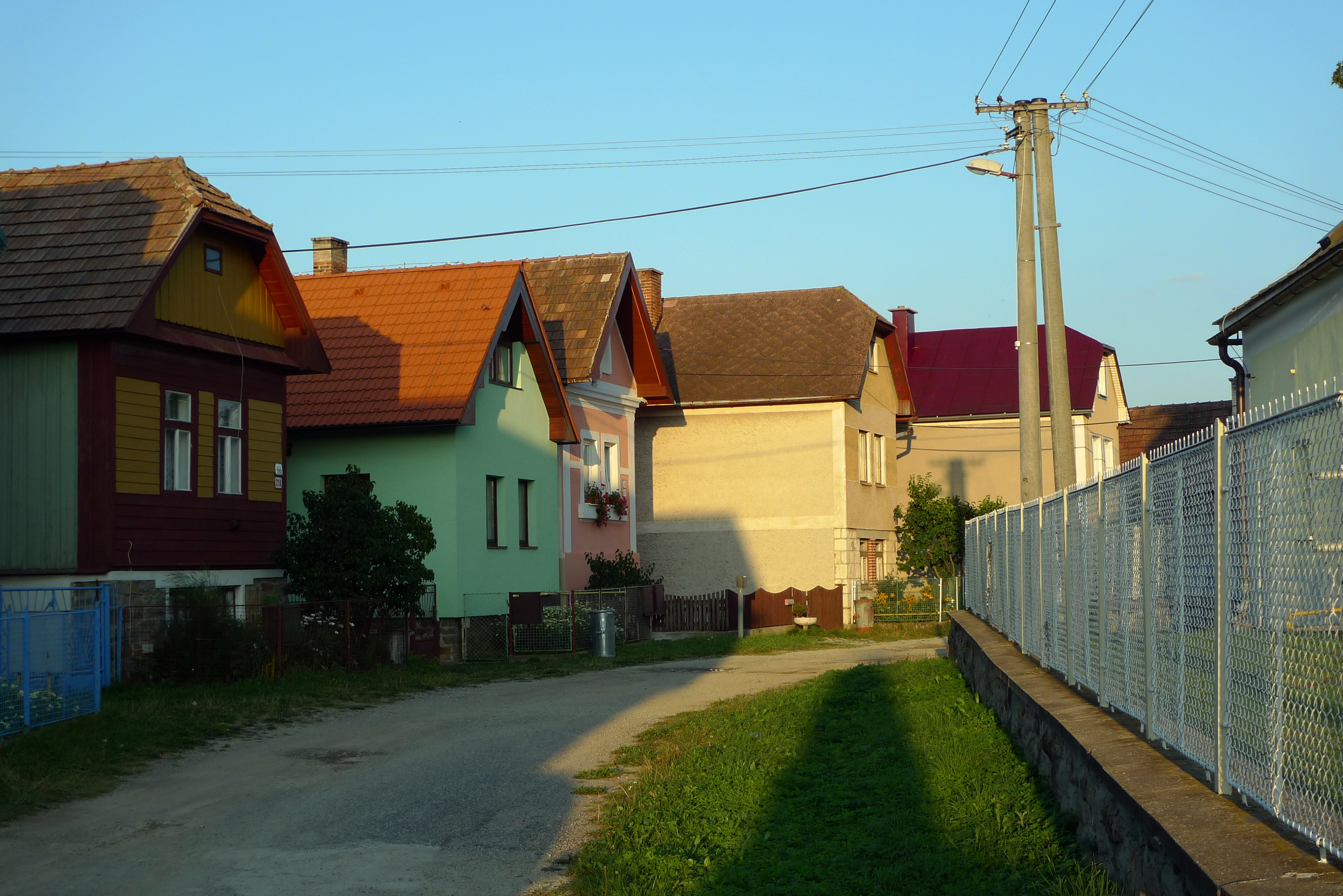

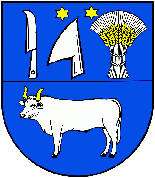
- Flag Coat of arms

- Location of Šuňava in the Prešov Region Location of Šuňava in Slovakia
- Coordinates: 49.03°N 20.09°E
- Country: Slovakia
- Region: Prešov Region
- District: Poprad District
- First mentioned: 1269

Area
  - Total: 26.38 km^{2} (10.19 sq mi)
- Elevation: 854 m (2,802 ft)

Population (2025)
  - Total: 1,967
- Time zone: UTC+1 (CET)
  - Summer (DST): UTC+2 (CEST)
- Postal code: 593 9
- Area code: +421 52
- Vehicle registration plate (until 2022): PP
- Website: www.sunava.sk

Šuňava is a village and municipality in Poprad District in the Prešov Region of northern Slovakia.

== Geography ==
The municipality lies at an altitude of 854 metres (2,802 ft) and covers an area of 26.38 km^{2} (10.19 sq mi) (2025).

== Population ==
Population statistic (10 years)
Year	1995	2005	2015	2025
Count	1817	1926	1971	1967
Difference		+5.99%	+2.33%	−0.20%

Population statistic
Year	2024	2025
Count	1957	1967
Difference		+0.51%

It has a population of 1967 people (31 December 2025).

=== Ethnicity ===
Census 2021 (1+ %)
Ethnicity	Number	Fraction
Slovak	1860	95.04%
Not found out	89	4.54%
Total	1957	

In year 2021 was 1957 people by ethnicity 1860 as Slovak, 89 as Not found out, 13 as Romani, 5 as Russian, 5 as Other, 3 as Rusyn, 3 as English, 2 as Czech, 2 as Polish, 2 as German, 2 as Hungarian, 1 as Canadian, 1 as Bulgarian and 1 as Albanian.

Note on population: The difference values of population numbers in the table "Population statistic" and in the sections "Ethnicity" & "Religion" is caused by the use of various statistical methods.

=== Religion ===
Census 2021 (1+ %)
Religion	Number	Fraction
Roman Catholic Church	1717	87.74%
Not found out	93	4.75%
None	92	4.7%
Greek Catholic Church	21	1.07%
Total	1957	

In year 2021 was 1957 people by religion 1717 from Roman Catholic Church, 93 from Not found out, 92 from None, 21 from Greek Catholic Church, 15 from Evangelical Church, 5 from Christian Congregations in Slovakia, 5 from Ad hoc movements, 4 from Other, 2 from Calvinist Church, 1 from Eastern Orthodox Church, 1 from Other and not ascertained christian church and 1 from Hinduism.

== History ==
In historical records the village was first mentioned in 1269.

== Infrastructure and economy ==
In the village is a gym hall and a central park. Šuňava is known for producing concrete blocks.

== Village churches ==
- Roman Catholic Church of All Saints
- Roman Catholic Church of St. Nicholas
