= Jánovce =

- Municipality
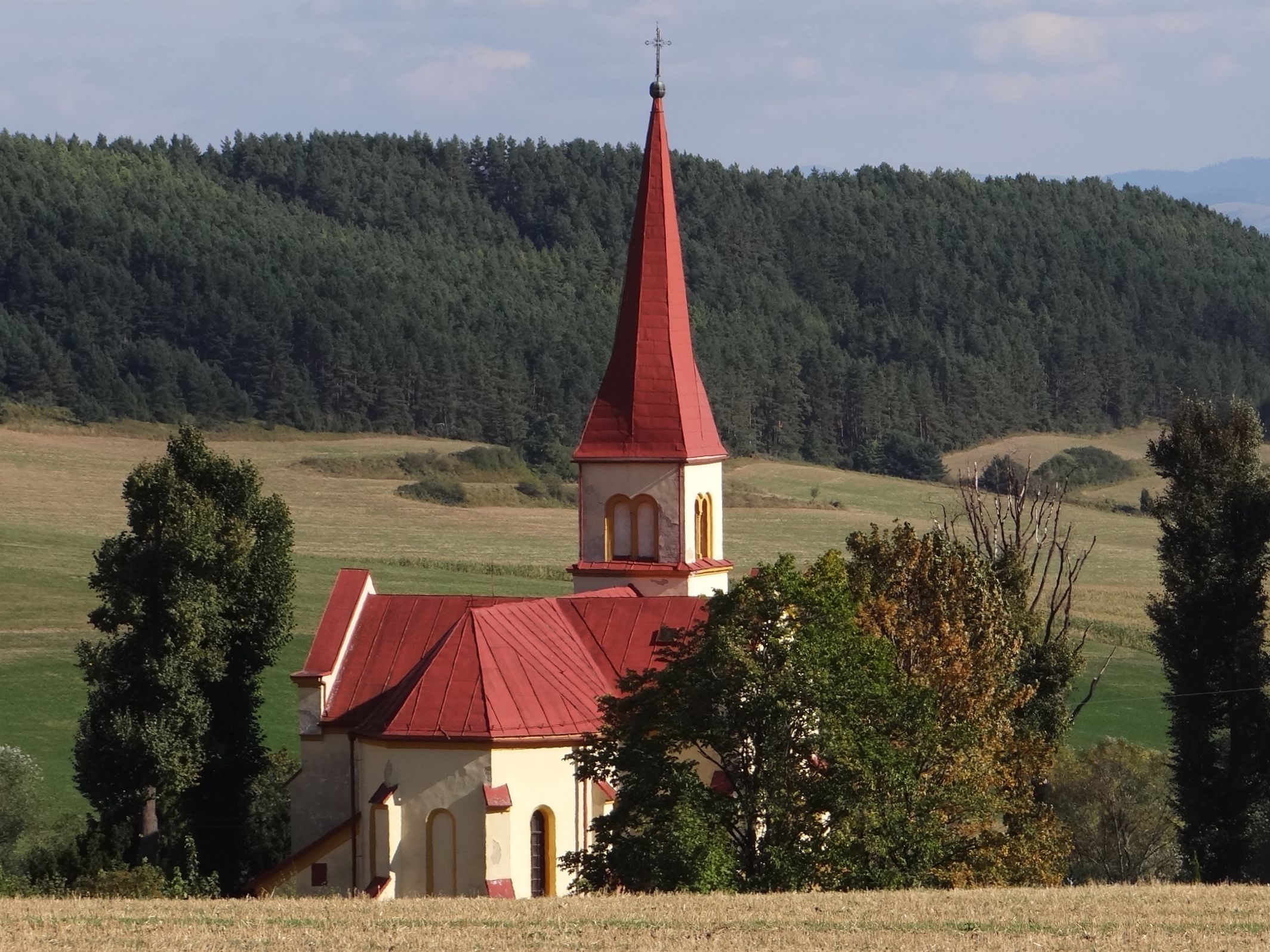

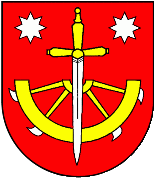
- Flag Coat of arms

- Location of Jánovce in the Prešov Region Location of Jánovce in Slovakia
- Coordinates: 49.02°N 20.43°E
- Country: Slovakia
- Region: Prešov Region
- District: Poprad District
- First mentioned: 1312

Area
  - Total: 9.61 km^{2} (3.71 sq mi)
- Elevation: 579 m (1,900 ft)

Population (2025)
  - Total: 1,804
- Time zone: UTC+1 (CET)
  - Summer (DST): UTC+2 (CEST)
- Postal code: 591 3
- Area code: +421 52
- Vehicle registration plate (until 2022): PP
- Website: obec-janovce.sk

Jánovce (Hungarian: Szepesjánosfalva) is a village and municipality in Poprad District in the Prešov Region of northern Slovakia.

== Geography ==
The municipality lies at an altitude of 579 metres (1,900 ft) and covers an area of 9.61 km^{2} (3.71 sq mi) (2025).

== History ==
In historical records the village was first mentioned in 1312.

== Population ==
Population statistic (10 years)
Year	1995	2005	2015	2025
Count	1017	1205	1611	1804
Difference		+18.48%	+33.69%	+11.98%

Population statistic
Year	2024	2025
Count	1773	1804
Difference		+1.74%

It has a population of 1804 people (2025-12-31).

== Economy and infrastructure ==
The village has table tennis, football and aerobic clubs. Cultural sightseers will enjoy the Late Baroque church with a Bothic altar.

== Notable personalities ==
- Mikuláš of Levoča, painter from 15th century, one of the major Gothic painters in Slovakia.
- Hadbavný Štefan Romuald, author of Latin-Slovak dictionary

== See also ==
- List of municipalities and towns in Slovakia

== Genealogical resources ==
The records for genealogical research are available at the state archive "Statny Archiv in Levoca, Slovakia"

- Roman Catholic church records (births/marriages/deaths): 1758-1897 (parish B)
