= Mengusovce =

- Municipality
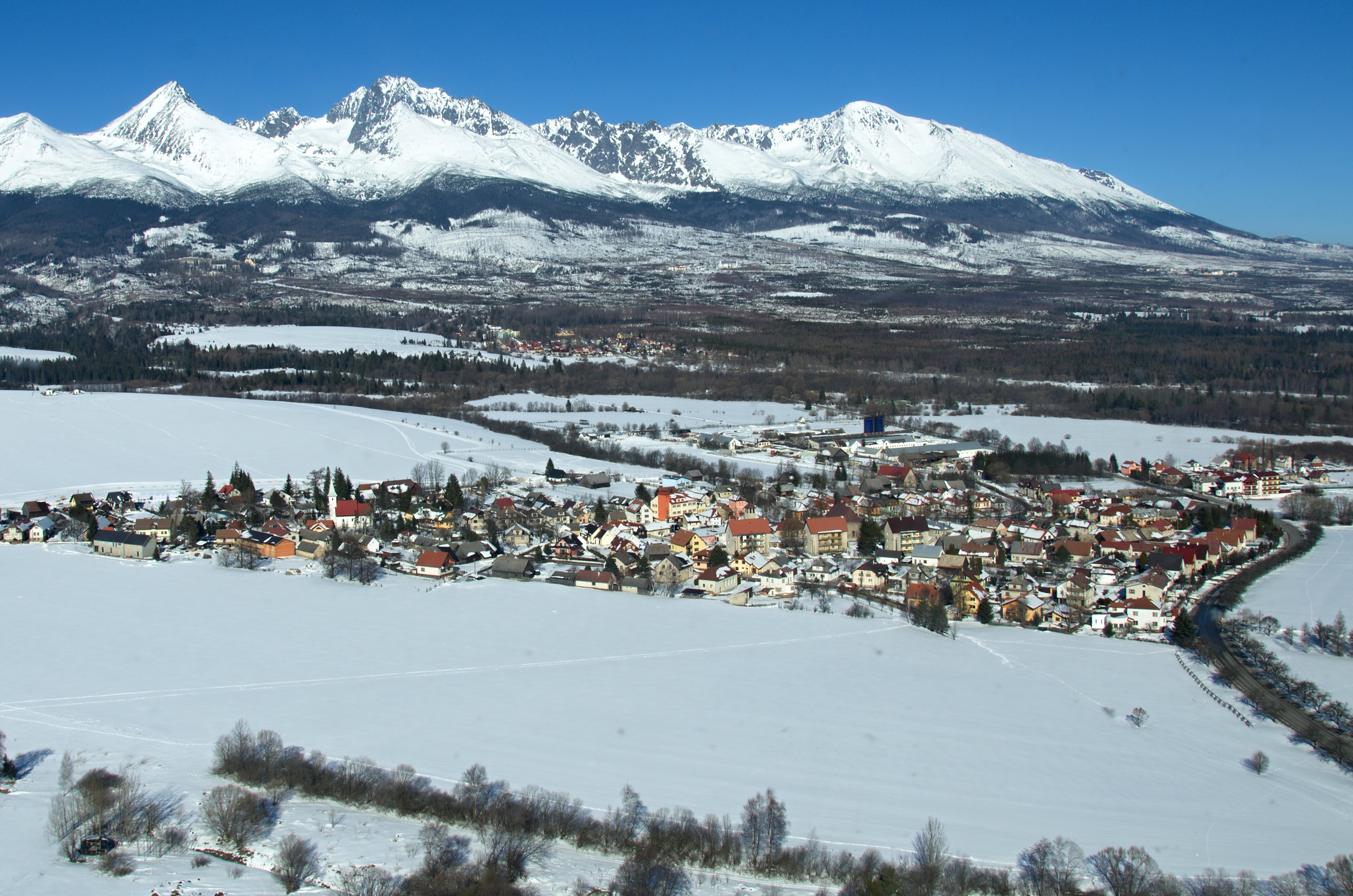

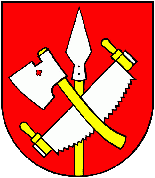
- Flag Coat of arms

- Location of Mengusovce in the Prešov Region Location of Mengusovce in Slovakia
- Coordinates: 49.07°N 20.14°E
- Country: Slovakia
- Region: Prešov Region
- District: Poprad District
- First mentioned: 1398

Area
  - Total: 8.94 km^{2} (3.45 sq mi)
- Elevation: 807 m (2,648 ft)

Population (2025)
  - Total: 683
- Time zone: UTC+1 (CET)
  - Summer (DST): UTC+2 (CEST)
- Postal code: 593 6
- Area code: +421 52
- Vehicle registration plate (until 2022): PP
- Website: www.mengusovce.sk

Mengusovce (Hungarian: Menguszfalva) is a village and municipality in Poprad District in the Prešov Region of northern Slovakia. It lies on the foothills of High Tatras.

== Geography ==
The municipality lies at an altitude of 807 metres (2,648 ft) and covers an area of 8.94 km^{2} (3.45 sq mi) (2025).

== Population ==
Population statistic (10 years)
Year	1995	2005	2015	2025
Count	566	609	670	683
Difference		+7.59%	+10.01%	+1.94%

Population statistic
Year	2024	2025
Count	682	683
Difference		+0.14%

It has a population of 683 people (31 December 2025).

=== Ethnicity ===
Census 2021 (1+ %)
Ethnicity	Number	Fraction
Slovak	627	91.53%
Not found out	49	7.15%
Romani	36	5.25%
Czech	12	1.75%
Total	685	

In year 2021 was 685 people by ethnicity 627 as Slovak, 49 as Not found out, 36 as Romani, 12 as Czech, 5 as English, 3 as Canadian and 2 as Other.

Note on population: The difference values of population numbers in the table "Population statistic" and in the sections "Ethnicity" & "Religion" is caused by the use of various statistical methods.

=== Religion ===
Census 2021 (1+ %)
Religion	Number	Fraction
Roman Catholic Church	266	38.83%
Evangelical Church	193	28.18%
None	112	16.35%
Not found out	61	8.91%
Baptists Church	22	3.21%
Greek Catholic Church	13	1.9%
Christian Congregations in Slovakia	7	1.02%
Total	685	

In year 2021 was 685 people by religion 266 from Roman Catholic Church, 193 from Evangelical Church, 112 from None, 61 from Not found out, 22 from Baptists Church, 13 from Greek Catholic Church, 7 from Christian Congregations in Slovakia, 3 from Other and not ascertained christian church, 3 from United Methodist Church, 2 from Buddhism, 1 from Old Catholic Church, 1 from Calvinist Church and 1 from Paganism and natural spirituality.

== History ==
In historical records the village was first mentioned in 1398.

== Infrastructure and economy ==
Mengusovce has a horse riding club. There are several boarding houses and private accommodations. The village is known for its annual rodeo festival.
