= Kravany, Poprad District =

Kravany
- Municipality
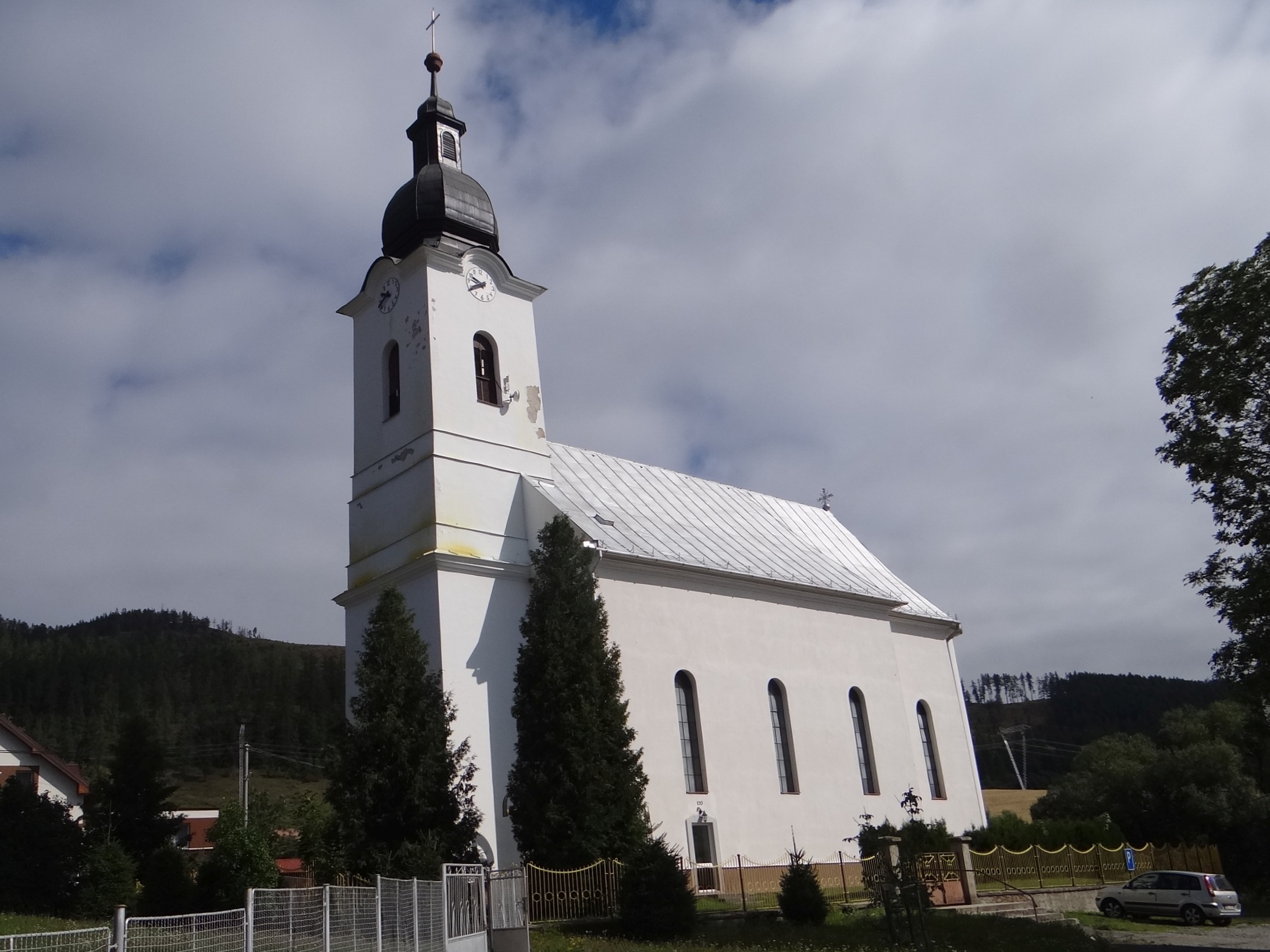

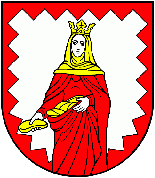
- Flag Coat of arms

- Location of Kravany in the Prešov Region Location of Kravany in Slovakia
- Coordinates: 49.00°N 20.20°E
- Country: Slovakia
- Region: Prešov Region
- District: Poprad District
- First mentioned: 1317

Area
  - Total: 24.44 km^{2} (9.44 sq mi)
- Elevation: 730 m (2,400 ft)

Population (2025)
  - Total: 892
- Time zone: UTC+1 (CET)
  - Summer (DST): UTC+2 (CEST)
- Postal code: 591 8
- Area code: +421 52
- Vehicle registration plate (until 2022): PP
- Website: www.obeckravany.sk

Kravany (Hungarian: Erzsébetháza) is a village and municipality in the Poprad District in the Prešov Region of eastern Slovakia.

== Population ==
Population statistic (10 years)
| Year | 1995 | 2005 | 2015 | 2025 |
|---|---|---|---|---|
| Count | 786 | 828 | 902 | 892 |
| Difference | | +5.34% | +8.93% | −1.10% |

Population statistic
| Year | 2024 | 2025 |
|---|---|---|
| Count | 900 | 892 |
| Difference | | −0.88% |

It has a population of 892 people (31 December 2025).

=== Ethnicity ===
Census 2021 (1+ %)
| Ethnicity | Number | Fraction |
|---|---|---|
| Slovak | 867 | 96.65% |
| Romani | 46 | 5.12% |
| Not found out | 13 | 1.44% |
| Total | 897 | |

In year 2021 was 897 people by ethnicity 867 as Slovak, 46 as Romani, 13 as Not found out, 2 as Czech, 2 as German, 1 as Rusyn and 1 as Other.

Note on population: The difference values of population numbers in the table "Population statistic" and in the sections "Ethnicity" & "Religion" is caused by the use of various statistical methods.

=== Religion ===
Census 2021 (1+ %)
| Religion | Number | Fraction |
|---|---|---|
| Roman Catholic Church | 774 | 86.29% |
| None | 73 | 8.14% |
| Not found out | 25 | 2.79% |
| Total | 897 | |

In year 2021 was 897 people by religion 774 from Roman Catholic Church, 73 from None, 25 from Not found out, 8 from Greek Catholic Church, 5 from Evangelical Church, 3 from Christian Congregations in Slovakia, 3 from Other, 2 from Buddhism, 2 from Baptists Church, 1 from Paganism and natural spirituality and 1 from Ad hoc movements.
