= Batizovce =

- Municipality
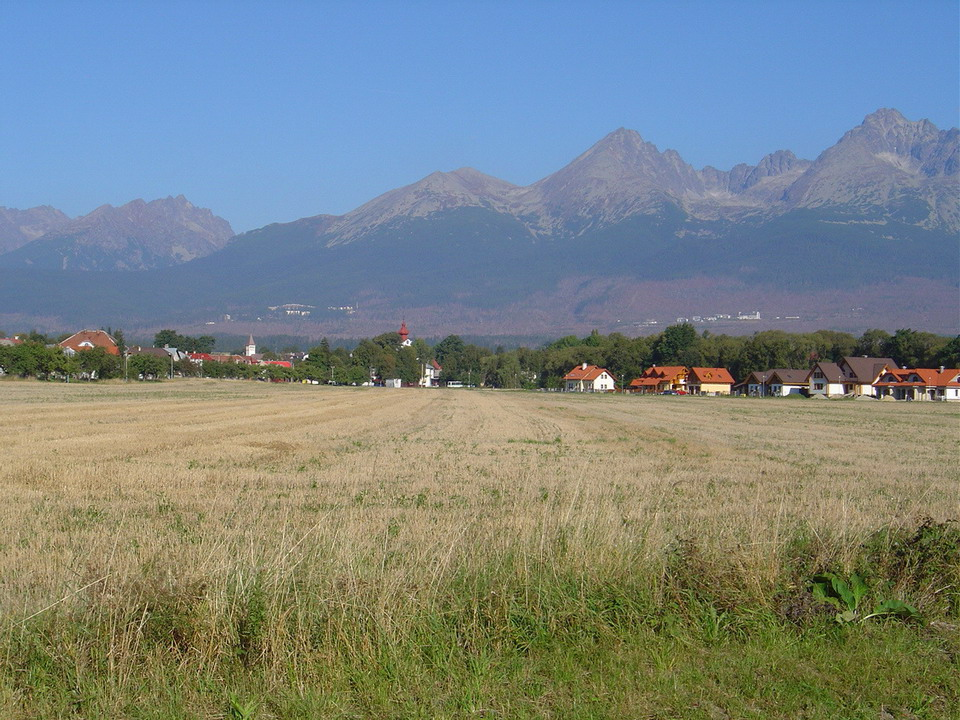

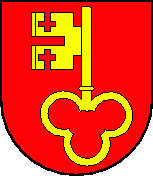
- Flag Coat of arms

- Location of Batizovce in the Prešov Region Location of Batizovce in Slovakia
- Coordinates: 49.08°N 20.20°E
- Country: Slovakia
- Region: Prešov Region
- District: Poprad District
- First mentioned: 1264

Area
  - Total: 14.36 km^{2} (5.54 sq mi)
- Elevation: 751 m (2,464 ft)

Population (2025)
  - Total: 2,613
- Time zone: UTC+1 (CET)
  - Summer (DST): UTC+2 (CEST)
- Postal code: 593 5
- Area code: +421 52
- Vehicle registration plate (until 2022): PP
- Website: www.obecbatizovce.sk

Batizovce (Hungarian: Batizfalva) is a village and municipality in the Poprad District in the Prešov Region of northern Slovakia. The village contains evangelical and Roman Catholic churches in classic and baroque styles.

== Geography ==
The municipality lies at an altitude of 751 metres (2,464 ft) and covers an area of 14.36 km^{2} (5.54 sq mi) (2025).

== History ==
In historical records the village was first mentioned in 1264. Locals had been engaged in agriculture, forestry, pottery, weaving and charcoal production. In 1934 they began to be employed in industrial facilities in Svit.

== Population ==
Population statistic (10 years)
| Year | 1995 | 2005 | 2015 | 2025 |
|---|---|---|---|---|
| Count | 1876 | 2156 | 2349 | 2613 |
| Difference | | +14.92% | +8.95% | +11.23% |

Population statistic
| Year | 2024 | 2025 |
|---|---|---|
| Count | 2587 | 2613 |
| Difference | | +1.00% |

It has a population of 2613 people (31 December 2025).

=== Ethnicity ===
Census 2021 (1+ %)
| Ethnicity | Number | Fraction |
|---|---|---|
| Slovak | 2247 | 91.45% |
| Not found out | 161 | 6.55% |
| Romani | 122 | 4.96% |
| Total | 2457 | |

In year 2021 was 2457 people by ethnicity 2247 as Slovak, 161 as Not found out, 122 as Romani, 18 as Czech, 11 as Rusyn, 10 as Russian, 5 as Other, 4 as Moravian, 2 as German, 2 as Hungarian, 2 as English, 1 as Ukrainian and 1 as Serbian.

Note on population: The difference values of population numbers in the table "Population statistic" and in the sections "Ethnicity" & "Religion" is caused by the use of various statistical methods.

=== Religion ===
Census 2021 (1+ %)
| Religion | Number | Fraction |
|---|---|---|
| Roman Catholic Church | 1311 | 53.36% |
| Evangelical Church | 496 | 20.19% |
| None | 305 | 12.41% |
| Not found out | 170 | 6.92% |
| Christian Congregations in Slovakia | 60 | 2.44% |
| Greek Catholic Church | 60 | 2.44% |
| Total | 2457 | |

In year 2021 was 2457 people by religion 1311 from Roman Catholic Church, 496 from Evangelical Church, 305 from None, 170 from Not found out, 60 from Christian Congregations in Slovakia, 60 from Greek Catholic Church, 16 from Baptists Church, 13 from Jehovah's Witnesses, 5 from Eastern Orthodox Church, 5 from Ad hoc movements, 4 from Other, 3 from Buddhism, 2 from Calvinist Church, 2 from Other and not ascertained christian church, 2 from United Methodist Church, 2 from Church of the Brethren and 1 from Jewish community.

== Genealogical resources ==
The records for genealogical research are available at the Spiš archive in Levoča (Slovak: Spišský archív v Levoči).

- Roman Catholic church records (births/marriages/deaths): 1844-1899 (parish A)
- Lutheran church records (births/marriages/deaths): 1710-1895 (parish A)

== See also ==
- List of municipalities and towns in Slovakia
