= Vikartovce =

- Municipality
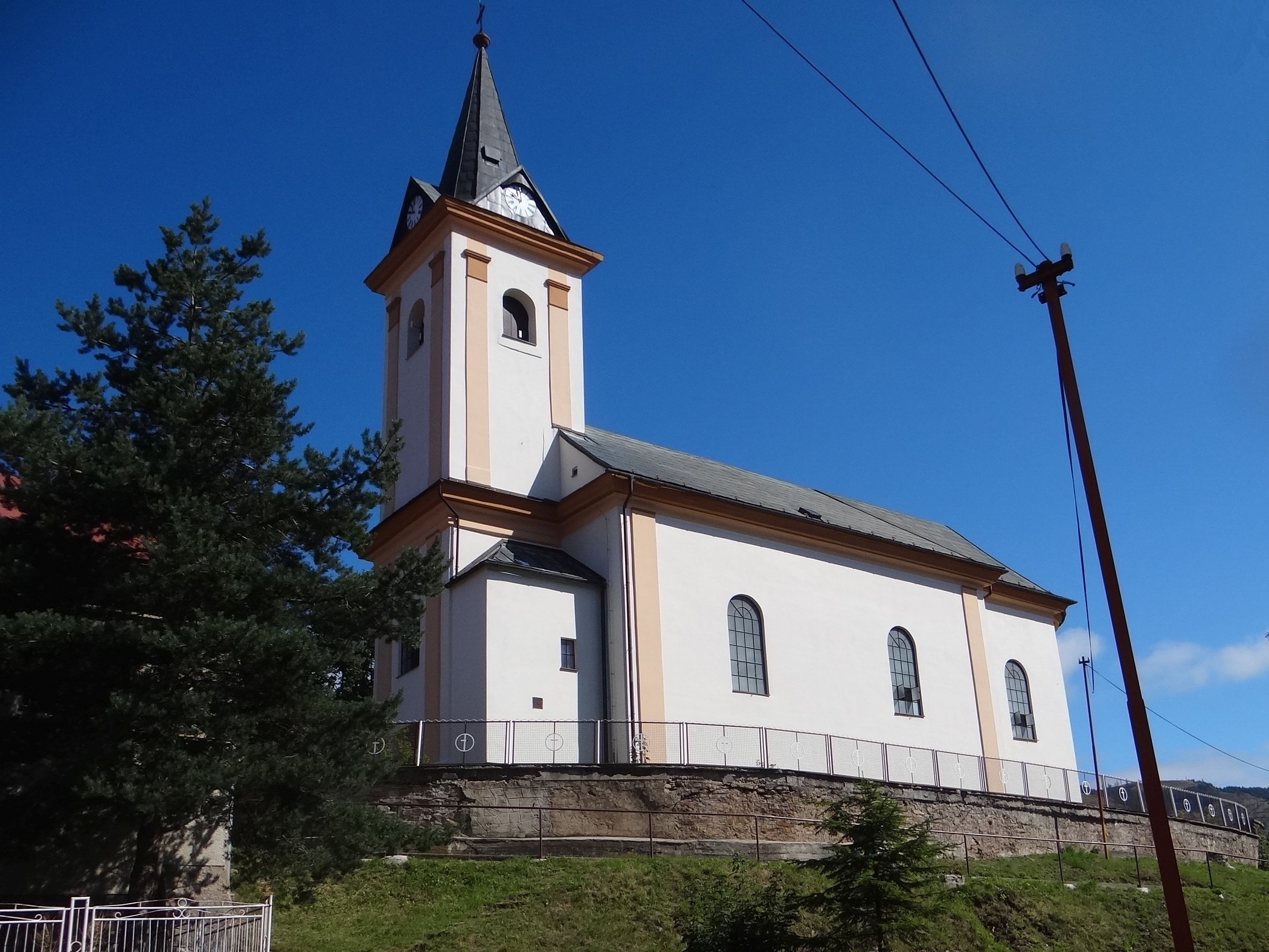

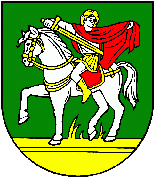
- Flag Coat of arms

- Location of Vernár in the Prešov Region Location of Vernár in Slovakia
- Coordinates: 48.993°N 20.152°E
- Country: Slovakia
- Region: Prešov Region
- District: Poprad District

Area
  - Total: 50.15 km^{2} (19.36 sq mi)
- Elevation: 751 m (2,464 ft)

Population (2025)
  - Total: 1,802
- Time zone: UTC+1 (CET)
  - Summer (DST): UTC+2 (CEST)
- Postal code: 059 19
- Area code: +421 52
- Vehicle registration plate (until 2022): PP

Vikartovce (Hungarian: Hernádfő, German: Weigsdorf, or Wikkersdorf, Weichsdorf, Rusyn: Вікартовце) is a village and large municipality in Poprad District in the Prešov Region of northern Slovakia.

== History ==
In historical records the village was first mentioned in 1283. Before the establishment of independent Czechoslovakia in 1918, Vikartovce was part of Szepes County within the Kingdom of Hungary. From 1939 to 1945, it was part of the Slovak Republic. On 28 January 1945, the Red Army dislodged the Wehrmacht from Vikartovce in the course of the Western Carpathian offensive and it was once again part of Czechoslovakia.

== Geography ==
The municipality lies at an altitude of 751 metres (2,464 ft) and covers an area of 50.15 km^{2} (19.36 sq mi) (2025).

== Population ==
Population statistic (10 years)
Year	1995	2005	2015	2025
Count	1639	1801	1868	1802
Difference		+9.88%	+3.72%	−3.53%

Population statistic
Year	2024	2025
Count	1825	1802
Difference		−1.26%

It has a population of 1802 people (31 December 2025).

=== Ethnicity ===
Census 2021 (1+%)
Ethnicity	Number	Fraction
Slovak	1813	97.68%
Romani	393	21.17%
Not found out	43	2.31%
Total	1856	

In year 2021 was 1856 people by ethnicity 1813 as Slovak, 393 as Romani, 43 as Not found out, 5 as Czech, 1 as Ukrainian, 1 as Russian and 1 as French.

Note on population: The difference values of population numbers in the table "Population statistic" and in the sections "Ethnicity" & "Religion" is caused by the use of various statistical methods.

=== Religion ===
Census 2021 (1+%)
Religion	Number	Fraction
Roman Catholic Church	1699	91.54%
None	60	3.23%
Not found out	47	2.53%
Total	1856	

In year 2021 was 1856 people by religion 1699 from Roman Catholic Church, 60 from None, 47 from Not found out, 14 from Christian Congregations in Slovakia, 13 from Other and not ascertained christian church, 8 from Greek Catholic Church, 4 from Ad hoc movements, 3 from Jewish community, 2 from Jehovah's Witnesses, 2 from Islam, 2 from Evangelical Church, 1 from Calvinist Church and 1 from United Methodist Church.

== Economy and infrastructure ==
In the village is football club. In 2010 Vikartovce had been a place for Slovakia Furman Championship /Majstrovstvá Slovenska furmanov/.
