= Poprad District =

Coordinates: 49°3′25″N 20°18′17″E

- District
- Country: Slovakia
- Region (kraj): Prešov Region
- Seat: Poprad

Area
  - Total: 1,104.69 km^{2} (426.52 sq mi)

Population (2025)
  - Total: 101,671
- Time zone: UTC+1 (CET)
  - Summer (DST): UTC+2 (CEST)
- Telephone prefix: 052
- Vehicle registration plate (until 2022): PP
- Municipalities: 29

Poprad District (okres Poprad) is a district in the Prešov Region of eastern Slovakia. The district had been established in 1923 and from 1996 exists in its current borders. It consists of 29 municipalities, from which three have a town status. Its seat, cultural and economic center is Poprad, the largest city. Main economic branches are industry and tourism. The High Tatras mountain range, the top tourist attraction in Slovakia, is located in Poprad district.

== Population ==
Population statistic (10 years)
| Year | 1995 | 2005 | 2015 | 2025 |
|---|---|---|---|---|
| Count | 101,465 | 104,326 | 104,468 | 101,671 |
| Difference | | +2.81% | +0.13% | −2.67% |

Population statistic
| Year | 2024 | 2025 |
|---|---|---|
| Count | 101,834 | 101,671 |
| Difference | | −0.16% |

It has a population of 101,671 people (31 December 2025).

Historical population
| Year | Pop. | ±% |
|---|---|---|
| 1970 | 68,533 | — |
| 1980 | 85,279 | +24.4% |
| 1991 | 97,926 | +14.8% |
| 2001 | 104,348 | +6.6% |
| 2011 | 103,914 | −0.4% |
| 2021 | 102,744 | −1.1% |
Source: Statistical Office of the Slovak Republic

=== Ethnicity ===
Census 2021 (1+ %)
| Ethnicity | Number | Fraction |
|---|---|---|
| Slovak | 95,844 | 88.87% |
| Not found out | 5651 | 5.24% |
| Romani | 3126 | 2.89% |
| Total | 107,843 | |

In year 2021 was 107,843 people by ethnicity 95,844 as Slovak, 5651 as Not found out, 3126 as Romani, 902 as Czech, 691 as Rusyn, 347 as Other, 228 as Hungarian, 188 as German, 183 as Polish, 148 as Russian, 125 as Ukrainian, 69 as Vietnamese, 51 as English, 34 as Jewish, 33 as Italian, 29 as Canadian, 27 as Chinese, 27 as Moravian, 22 as Irish, 22 as Austrian, 15 as Croatian, 13 as Albanian, 12 as Turkish, 12 as French, 12 as Bulgarian, 11 as Serbian, 11 as Romanian, 5 as Silesian, 3 as Greek and 2 as Korean.

Note on population: The difference values of population numbers in the table "Population statistic" and in the sections "Ethnicity" & "Religion" is caused by the use of various statistical methods.

=== Religion ===
Census 2021 (1+ %)
| Religion | Number | Fraction |
|---|---|---|
| Roman Catholic Church | 61,350 | 59.71% |
| None | 21,047 | 20.48% |
| Evangelical Church | 7377 | 7.18% |
| Not found out | 6220 | 6.05% |
| Greek Catholic Church | 3113 | 3.03% |
| Total | 102,744 | |

In year 2021 was 102,744 people by religion 61,350 from Roman Catholic Church, 21,047 from None, 7377 from Evangelical Church, 6220 from Not found out, 3113 from Greek Catholic Church, 827 from Eastern Orthodox Church, 671 from Christian Congregations in Slovakia, 359 from Ad hoc movements, 323 from Other and not ascertained christian church, 268 from Baptists Church, 255 from Other, 132 from Apostolic Church, 123 from Buddhism, 116 from Calvinist Church, 114 from Jehovah's Witnesses, 109 from Seventh-day Adventist Church, 101 from Paganism and natural spirituality, 62 from United Methodist Church, 52 from Old Catholic Church, 46 from Islam, 27 from Jewish community, 19 from Hinduism, 10 from Church of the Brethren, 6 from New Apostolic Church, 6 from Czechoslovak Hussite Church, 6 from Bahá'i Community and 5 from Church of Jesus Christ of Latter-day Saints.

== Municipalities ==
| Municipality | Area [km^{2}] | Population |
|---|---|---|
| Batizovce | 14.36 | 2,613 |
| Gánovce | 7.82 | 1,416 |
| Gerlachov | 5.26 | 869 |
| Hôrka | 11.35 | 2,165 |
| Hozelec | 4.01 | 776 |
| Hranovnica | 32.47 | 3,279 |
| Jánovce | 9.61 | 1,804 |
| Kravany | 24.44 | 892 |
| Liptovská Teplička | 98.68 | 2,364 |
| Lučivná | 18.76 | 922 |
| Mengusovce | 8.94 | 683 |
| Mlynica | 7.65 | 919 |
| Nová Lesná | 4.16 | 1,621 |
| Poprad | 63.05 | 48,034 |
| Spišská Teplica | 31.11 | 2,303 |
| Spišské Bystré | 38.03 | 2,485 |
| Spišský Štiavnik | 18.36 | 2,871 |
| Svit | 4.50 | 7,642 |
| Štôla | 2.55 | 515 |
| Štrba | 42.96 | 3,306 |
| Šuňava | 26.38 | 1,967 |
| Švábovce | 9.06 | 1,692 |
| Tatranská Javorina | 94.06 | 166 |
| Veľký Slavkov | 12.21 | 1,551 |
| Vernár | 52.90 | 545 |
| Vikartovce | 50.15 | 1,802 |
| Vydrník | 4.96 | 1,365 |
| Vysoké Tatry | 398.16 | 3,749 |
| Ždiar | 27.32 | 1,355 |

Population and area values are current for year 2025.
