= Gerlach (disambiguation) =

Gerlach is a male given name and a surname. Gerlach may also refer to:

- Gerlach, Nevada, United States, a census-designated place
- Gerlach Peak, the highest peak in the High Tatras, Slovakia

== See also ==
- Gerlachs Park, a park in Malmö, Sweden
- Gerlach Barklow Co., American manufacturer of art calendars
