= Gerlachov =

Gerlachov, derived from the Germanic name Gerlach with Slavic suffix -ov, may refer to:

- Gerlachov, Bardejov District, Slovakia
- Gerlachov, Poprad District, Slovakia
- Gerlachovský štít, highest peak in Slovakia
