= Ludwig Greiner =

Austrian businessman (1796–1882)

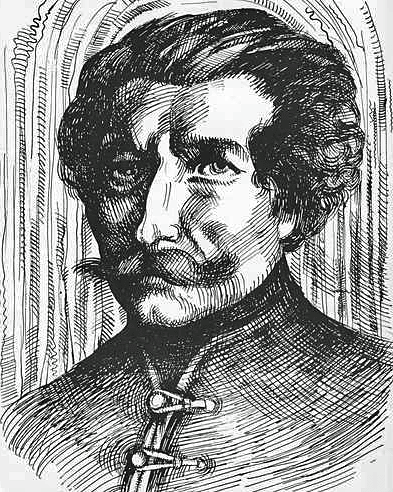
- Born: Ludwig Greiner; 1796; Lichtentanne, Saxe-Coburg-Saalfeld
- Died: 28 October 1882 (aged 85–86); Jolsva, Austro-Hungarian Empire (today Jelšava, Slovakia)
- Resting place: Jelšava, Slovakia
- Other names: Ľudovít Greiner; Lajos Greiner
- Education: Vienna University of Technology
- Occupations: Head of forestry and land management
- Employer(s): Duke of Saxe-Coburg; Prince Ferdinand of Saxe-Coburg and Gotha
- Known for: Triangulated Gerlach as summit of the Carpathians
- Spouse(s): Maria Glosz (−1857); Otilia Szinowitz
- Children: Hugo Greiner (? – 1873); Ludwig Greiner (1835–1904)

Ludwig Greiner (1796–1882) was a 19th-century forest and lumber industry management expert who improved the effectiveness of woodland valuation methods in the Austrian Empire and trained a whole new generation of foresters in a comprehensive approach to the management of natural resources. While his goals were defined by a need to run a profitable business, he introduced procedures that replaced previous exploitative, earth-eroding lumbering on Saxe-Coburg's estates with practices that contained aspects of modern ecology. Greiner's insistence on a thorough woodland inventory of his employer's vast, poorly charted lands gave him his enduring recognition outside the field defined by his expertise. His passion for precision, geomatics, and the outdoors made him the first person to disprove the results of previous measurements and accurately identify Gerlachovský štít as the highest peak in the whole 1,500 km (900 mi.) long Carpathian mountain range.

== Early life ==
Greiner was born to the family of the Lutheran pastor Karl Greiner in the small village of Lichtentanne (today part of Probstzella) in Saxe-Coburg-Saalfeld in 1796. His baptismal name is still spelt Ludwig in German, Polish, and some Slovak sources, which was also the name he used in his publications. Most Slovak sources now render his baptismal name as Ľudovít, the Hungarian sources render it as Lajos. Non-specialist sources also mostly misidentify him as a rank-and-file forester. After high school, he took special qualifying tests in forestry and spent several years gaining experience as forester in Austria and on the Lubomirski estates (administrated by the heirs of Julia Lubomirska) in Habsburg Galicia in the Łańcut and Lviv regions, now in Poland and Ukraine. He finished his education at the Vienna University of Technology, where he took mathematics, physics, and chemistry from 1824 to 1826. He then became the director of forest management and timber rafting on Duke Ernest of Saxe-Coburg's estates, from where he was hired by Ernest's brother Ferdinand as the head of forestry and land management of all of his estates.

== Years at Jolsva ==
Ludwig Greiner started his job at Jolsva (today Jelšava, Slovakia) on 1 April 1828. The estates as a company were headquartered in Vienna, but its centre of operations was at Jolsva (Jelšava), where Greiner spent the rest of his life. He married Maria Glósz, with whom he had nine children. Two sons, Hugo and Ludwig, followed in their father's footsteps. After his wife's death in 1857, Greiner married Otilia Szinowitz of Besztercabánya (today Banská Bystrica, Slovakia), but had no more children. He was buried at the Jolsva (Jelšava) cemetery next to his first wife.

=== Descendants ===
His son Ludwig Junior became chief engineer at the Coburg-Saxe estates and later forest management director at Rozsnyó (today Rožňava, Slovakia), where he was a founder of the private Girls' Institute of Education in 1871, the first high school in the Hungarian part of what was then the Austro-Hungarian Empire projected specifically for Slovak female students. Ludwig Greiner Senior's great-granddaughter Sibylla Greinerová (b. 1919) became an acknowledged Bratislava painter of human figures in motion.

== Triangulation of Gerlachovský Peak ==
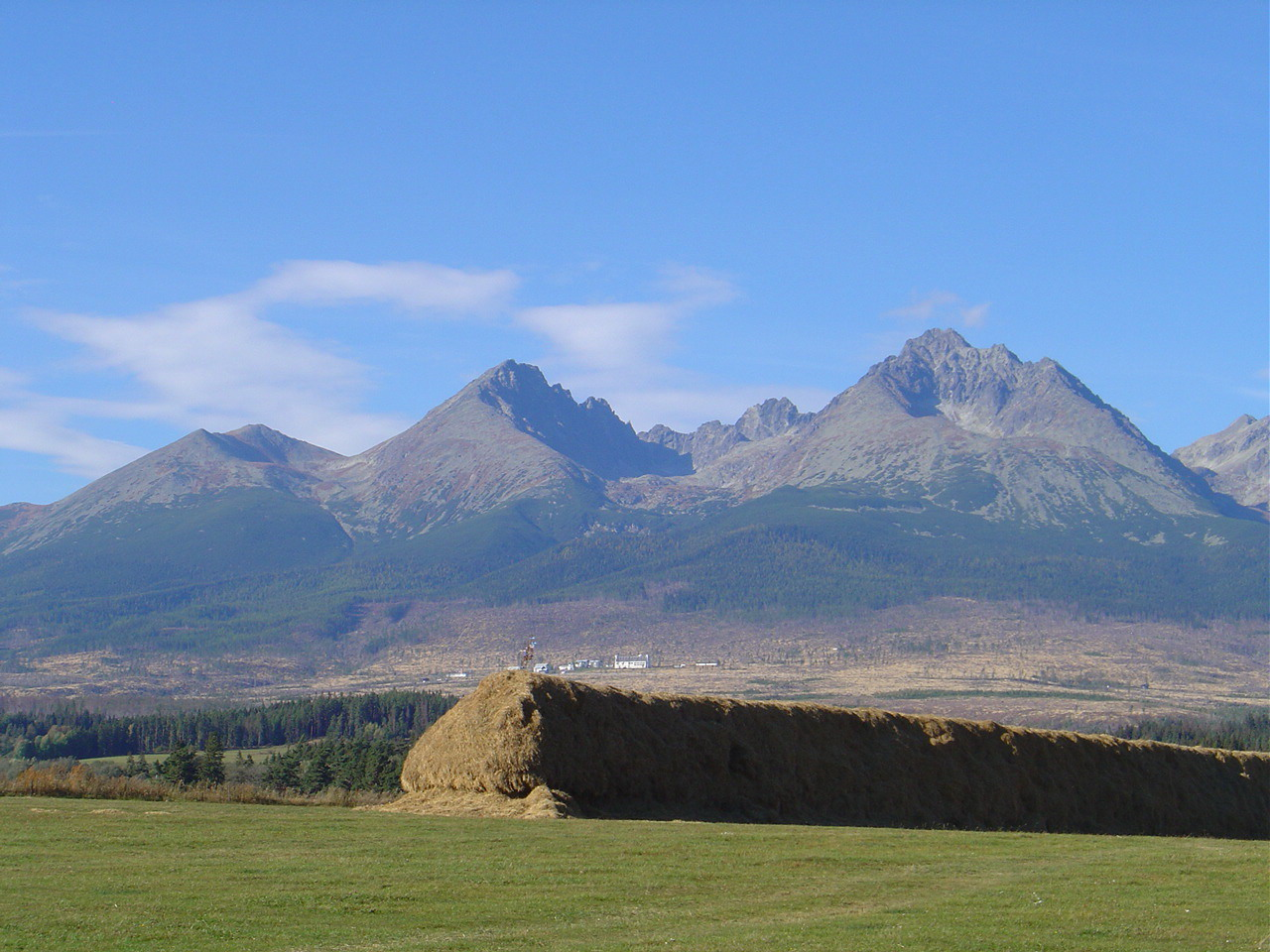
Gerlachovský Peak (right), the Tatras, Slovakia The highest mountain in the Carpathians

Ferdinand Saxe-Coburg's estates were distributed over areas that are located in today's Slovakia and Hungary. The estate managed from Káposztafalva (today Hrabušice, Slovakia) was in the vicinity of the Tatra Mountains, a craggy section of the Carpathians. According to Greiner's own account, he climbed Lomnický Peak (Hungarian: Lomnici-csúcs) on 10 August 1837, a beautiful sunny day, measured its elevation with an altimeter and used the quadrant to determine that Gerlachovský Peak (Hungarian: Gerlachfalvi-csúcs) was actually higher. It was unexpected, because the previous, generally accepted measurement by the Swedish botanist Göran Wahlenberg from 1813 recorded Gerlachovský Peak's elevation as 285 m (935 ft) lower. Greiner was convinced that his own observation about Gerlachovský Peak's relative height was right, but because he considered the altimeter and quadrant insufficiently precise instruments, he triangulated the elevations of several of the Tatra peaks from the vicinity of the town of Poprád (today Poprad, Slovakia), not far from Káposztafalva (Hrabušice), in the fall of 1838 after he obtained a very accurate theodolite from a friend. Greiner's paper published the next year dethroned the mountains of Kriváň (Hungarian: Kriván) and Lomnický Peak, which had been alternately considered the highest peaks until then, and reported that the highest point in the Tatras and the whole Carpathian chain was Gerlachovský Peak. The elevation Greiner calculated was off by only 13 meters (43 ft) by comparison to what it is known to be today.

== Head of forestry and land management ==
Greiner improved the effectiveness of the woodland valuation methods in the Kingdom of Hungary and trained a whole new generation of foresters in a comprehensive approach to the management of natural resources. In 1851, he helped to organize the Hungarian Forestry Association (Ungarischer Forstverein) and then served as its vice president. While his goals were defined by a need to run a profitable business, he introduced procedures that replaced previous exploitative, earth-eroding lumbering on Saxe-Coburg's estates with practices that contained aspects of modern ecology. Among his lasting environmental achievements has been the restoration of the timberline on largely deforested King's Bald Mountain (Hungarian: Király-hegy, Slovak: Kráľova hoľa 1,946 m, 6,385 ft.) to its natural elevation of 1,650 m (5,413 ft). One of his 21st-century successors described Greiner's principles in modern terms as aiming at and achieving permanent sustainability. Greiner's timber yield tables published in 1877 and 1886 proved sufficiently reliable to have remained in use for over a century.

== Publications by Ludwig Greiner ==
- 1839 − Contributions to the General Knowledge and Improvement of Hungarian Forestry I. (Beiträge zur Kenntnis und Verbesserung des ungarischen Forstwesens in Allgemeinen I.)
- 1839 − Gerlachovský Peak as the highest mountain elevation of the Carpathians. ("Die Gerlsdorfer Spitze, als die höchste Gebirgshöhe der Karpathen." Gemeinnützige Blaetter zur Belehrung und Unterhaltung.)
- 1843 − Contributions to the General Knowledge and Improvement of Hungarian Forestry II. (Beiträge zur Kenntnis und Verbesserung des ungarischen Forstwesens in Allgemeinen II.)
- 1845 − How Could the Very Appreciable Timber Shortage and Forest Loss in our Parts Szepesség (today Spiš, Slovakia) Be Most Effectively Remedied? Answered by Ludwig Greiner. (Wodurch könnte dem sehr fühlbaren Holzmangel und der Waldverwüstung in unserer Gegend (Zipsen) am zweckmäßigsten abgeholfen werden? Beantwortet von Ludwig Greiner.)

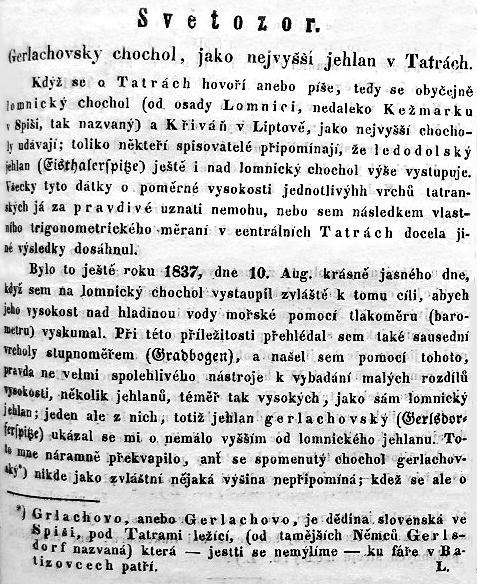
"Gerlachovský Crest as..." Slovenské noviny, 1851

- 1851 − Gerlachovský Crest as the highest peak in the Tatras. ("Gerlachovský chochol, jako nejvyšší jehlan v Tatrách." Slovenské noviny.)
- 1852 − On the determination of elevations in the Carpathians. ("Über Höhenbestimmungen der Karpathen." Allgemeine Land- und Forstwirtschaftliche Zeitung.)
- 1856 − Briefings on the experiences with the most reliable methods of forest stand rejuvenation in high mountains, namely in the Carpathians. ("Mittheilungen der Erfahrungen über die bewährtesten Verjüngungsarten der Bestände im Hochgebirge, namentlich in den Karpathen." Mittheilungen des ungarischen Forstvereines.)
- 1856 − Briefings on the density and conditions of the larches in the higher Carpathians, in which of those managed forest locations they receded and what are the obstacles to their greater spread. ("Mittheilungen über das Vorkommen und Gedeihen der Lärche in den höheren Karpathen, welche Stelle ihr in dem dort. Forsthaushalte einzuräumen wäre u. welche Hindernisse ihrer grössern Verbreitung entgegen stehen." Mittheilungen des ungarischen Forstvereines.)
- 1867 Gömör County forestry dynamics. ("Gömörmegye erdőszeti viszonyai." Erdészeti és gazdászati lapok. In three parts.)
- 1873 − Forest Data for the Gömör County Woodlands in Hungary. (Forststatistik der Waldungen des Gömörer Comitates in Ungarn.)
- 1873 − Essentials of Forest Valuation Operations and Forest Map Imaging at the Saxe-Coburg Ducal Assets in Hungary. (Grundzüge zu dem Forst-Taxationsverfahren und zum Zeichnen der Forstkarten auf den herzogl. Sachsen- Coburg'schen Gütern in Ungarn.)
- 1877 − Yield Tables. (Termési táblák. Reissued in 1886.)
- 1882 − A Guideline to the Execution of Timber Yield Management in the High Forests of the Saxe-Coburg-Gotha Ducal Estates of Murányalja (today Muráň, Slovakia) and Káposztafalva (Hrabušice). (Instruktion zur Führung der Forstertrags-Kontrolle in den Hochwaldforsten der herzogl. sachsen-coburg-gothaischen Herrschaften Murány und Kapsdorf.)
