= Kriváň (peak) =

Mountain in Slovakia

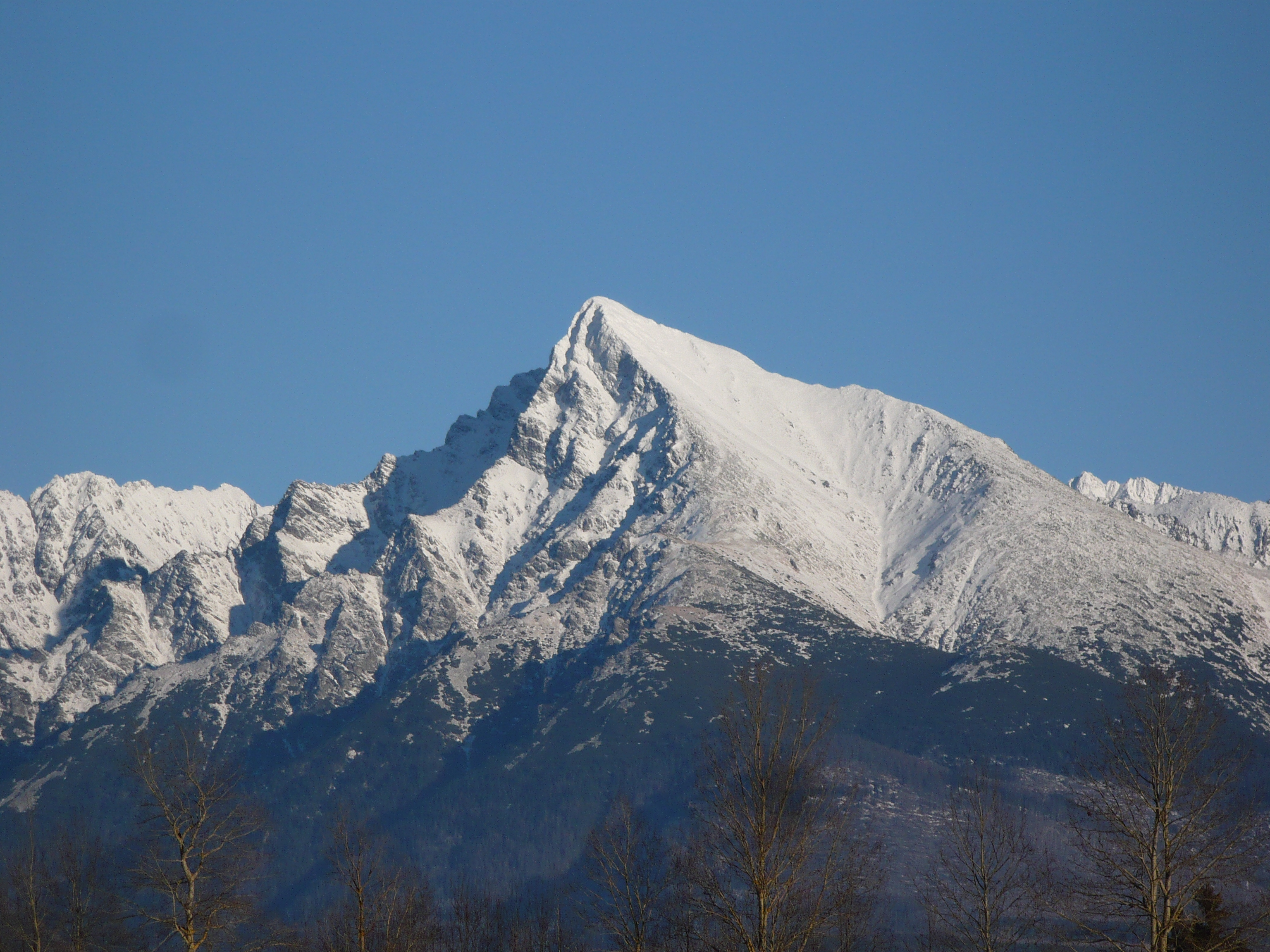

Highest point
- Elevation: 2,495 m (8,186 ft)
- Prominence: 410 m (1,350 ft)
- Isolation: 6.75 km (4.19 mi) to Ťažký štít
- Coordinates: 49°09′46″N 19°59′59″E

Naming
- Etymology: "angled"

Geography
- Location within Slovakia
- Location: Poprad/Liptovský Mikuláš, Prešov/Žilina, Slovakia
- Parent range: High Tatras

Geology
- Mountain type: granite

Climbing
- First ascent: Andreas Jonas Czirbes, 1772 / 1773
- Easiest route: Hike from Štrbské Pleso

Kriváň is a mountain in the High Tatras, Slovakia, that dominates the upper part of the former Liptov County. Multiple surveys among nature lovers have ranked it as the country's most beautiful peak. Readily accessible along maintained marked trails and with the exceptional vistas afforded from its summit, it is the hikers' favorite mountain in the western part of the High Tatras. Kriváň has also been a major symbol in Slovak ethnic and national activism for the past two centuries. It has been referenced in works of art from 19th-century literature, through paintings, film documentaries, to a Polish rock track. A country-wide vote in 2005 selected it to be one of the images on Slovakia's euro coins.

== Name ==
The name Kriváň, first recorded as Kriwan in 1639, is derived from the root kriv- meaning "bent" or "crooked". It reflects the angled appearance of its shape when viewed from the west and south, characterized in the work from 1639 as an "oxtail" (cauda bubula in the Latin original). The Slovak name is used in other languages including in Polish, rather than its potential Polonized version (Krzywań), except occasionally in Podhale in the immediate vicinity of the Tatras.

Two adjacent peaks in the nearby Malá Fatra range carry the same name - Veľký Fatranský Kriváň and Malý Fatranský Kriváň, and so does the village of Kriváň further away in southern Slovakia.

== History ==
=== Elevation ===
Based merely on visual observation, Kriváň competed for the status of the highest mountain in the High Tatras with Lomnický štít, which dominates the view from the east, until 1793 when the latter was accurately identified as the higher of the two (but wrongly as the highest peak in the mountain range, an error corrected by Ludwig Greiner in 1837):

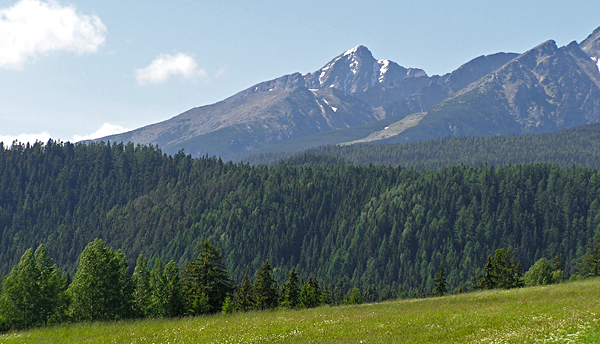
"The weather was very fine, and the Krivan, having got in the night a cap of snow, looked sublime..." R. Townson, 1793

[Kriváň] is generally said to be the highest of all the Alps in the Carpathian chain; but this opinion is not supposed to be founded upon any measurement.

The relative elevations of the two mountains were determined by the English natural historian Robert Townson, who ascended both peaks in August 1793 and also made an early recorded comment on Kriváň's aesthetic appeal:

The weather was very fine, and the Krivan, having got in the night a cap of snow, looked sublime. [...] 1888 yards above the village of Vasetz [Važec]; the Krivan is therefore something lower than the Lomnitz Peak [Lomnický štít].

The exact elevation of Kriváň is currently recognized as 2,494.7 metres (8,184.7 ft)

Kriváň is believed to have the greatest height from its base in the whole Tatras, as it rises from the bottom of the Kôprova valley or from Tri Studničky up to 1,400 metres (4,600 feet).

=== Ascents ===
==== Before 1800 ====
A travel book Ungarisher oder Dacianisher Simplicissimus written by Daniel Georg Speer in 1693 mentions a current legend (may have more ancient roots) explaining how Krivan got its shape. Lucifer (the carrier of light) flew over Tatras carrying some people to hell. His foot tripped on the tip of Krivan which got bent, and losing his balance he dropped the sinners who populated since the county of Liptov. Records of explorations by miners in the Kriváň massif date to the first half of the 15th century. Their presence increased during the gold rush of the 16th century. Although they may not have been the first to do so, it is probable that some of the miners reached the top of Kriváň; remnants of their shacks have survived below Priehyba Ridge at the elevation of about 2,000 m (6,560 ft.) through the present, and the highest, long abandoned, Terézia Shaft is merely about 60 m (200 ft.) below the summit. The commercial exploitation of the meager deposits discovered at Kriváň proved to be barely viable. It was abandoned in the 18th century.

The Scottish doctor Townson who ascended it in 1793 provided some evidence that Kriváň was already a recognized occasional destination for tourists in the second half of the 18th century. His guide from Važec had been to the top several times before and Townson saw him collect small coins from under a summit stone where hikers would leave them for luck. The first recorded ascent of Kriváň was by the Lutheran Pastor Andreas Jonas Czirbes from Spišská Nová Ves on 4 August 1773.

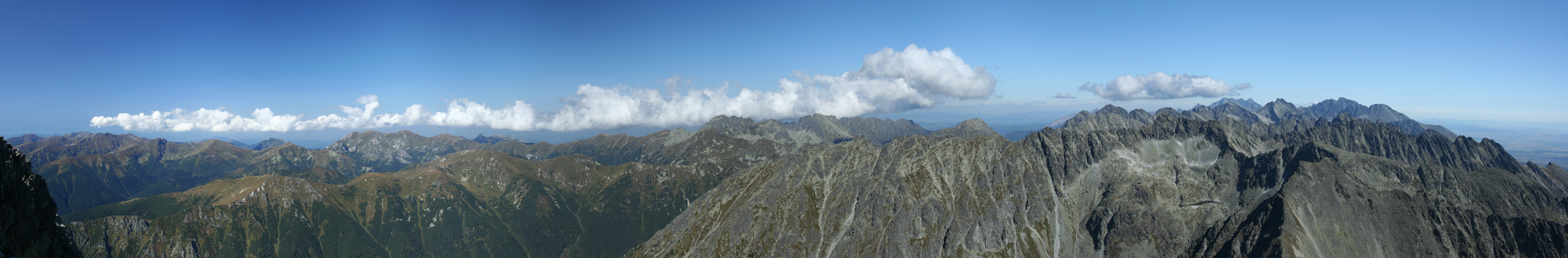
Tatra Mountains Panorama from the peak of Kriváň

==== Celebrities ====
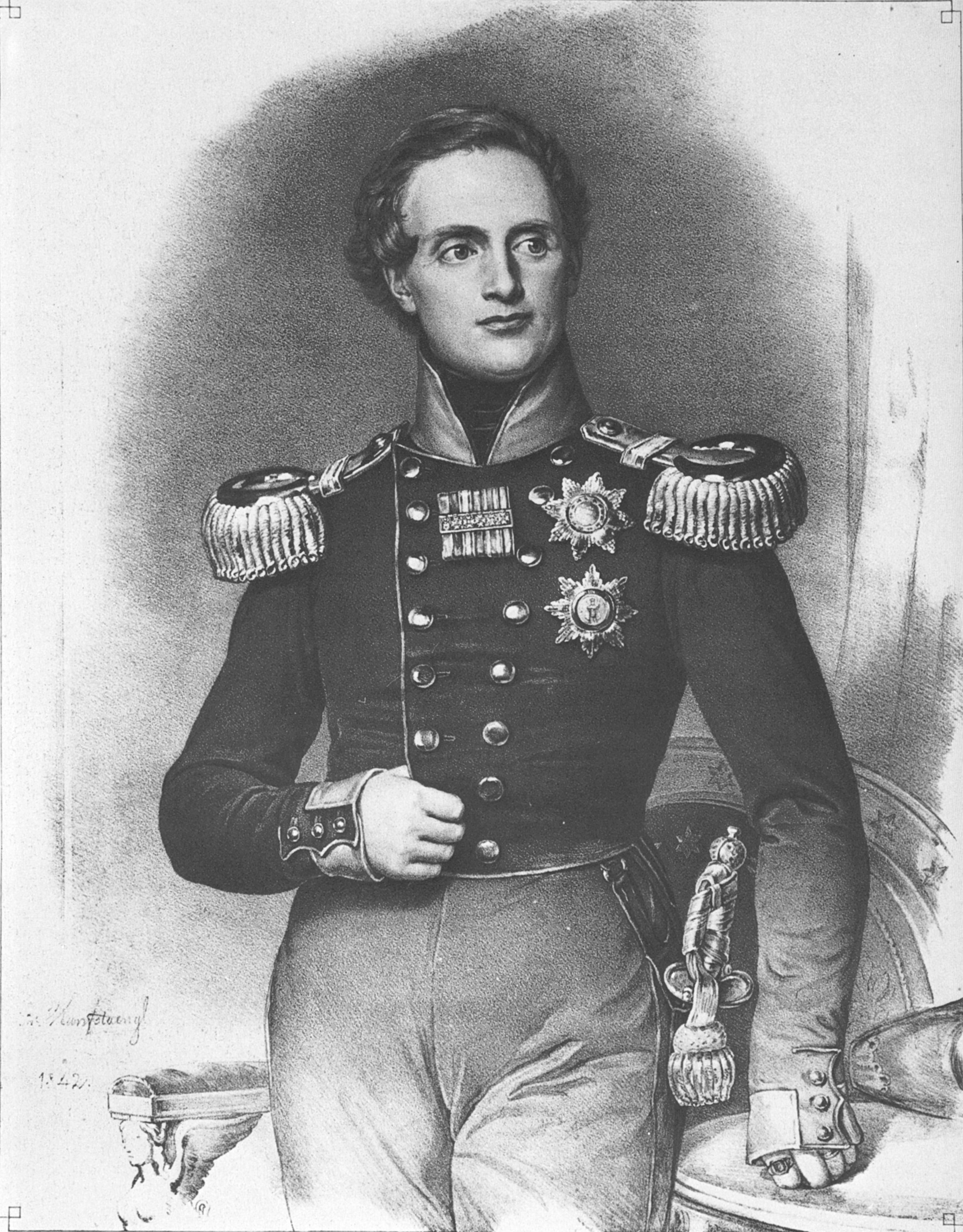
Frederick II

The first celebrity to attempt ascent of Kriváň was the 30-year-old Habsburg Archduke Joseph in 1806, but the plan was abandoned due to inclement weather although parts of the winding road to the old gold mine high on the slopes had already been improved and a campsite built. The first VIP actually to reach the summit was the 43-year-old King Frederick Augustus II of Saxony in 1840. The plaque placed at the top to commemorate the first monarch who stood there was gradually destroyed by activists in the 1850s-1860s, who would have wished the inscription to include a comment in Slovak and who objected to where the inscription spoke of the Hungarian (ethnic) nation in reference to all the subjects of the Kingdom of Hungary.

Lower nobleman Gašpar Fejérpataky-Belopotocký, an influential publisher based at Liptovský Mikuláš 20 miles from Kriváň, and his six friends climbed to the top of Kriváň on 24 Sept. 1835, which he described in the literary journal Hronka in 1837. The account may have stimulated its readers who lived farther away to follow their steps.

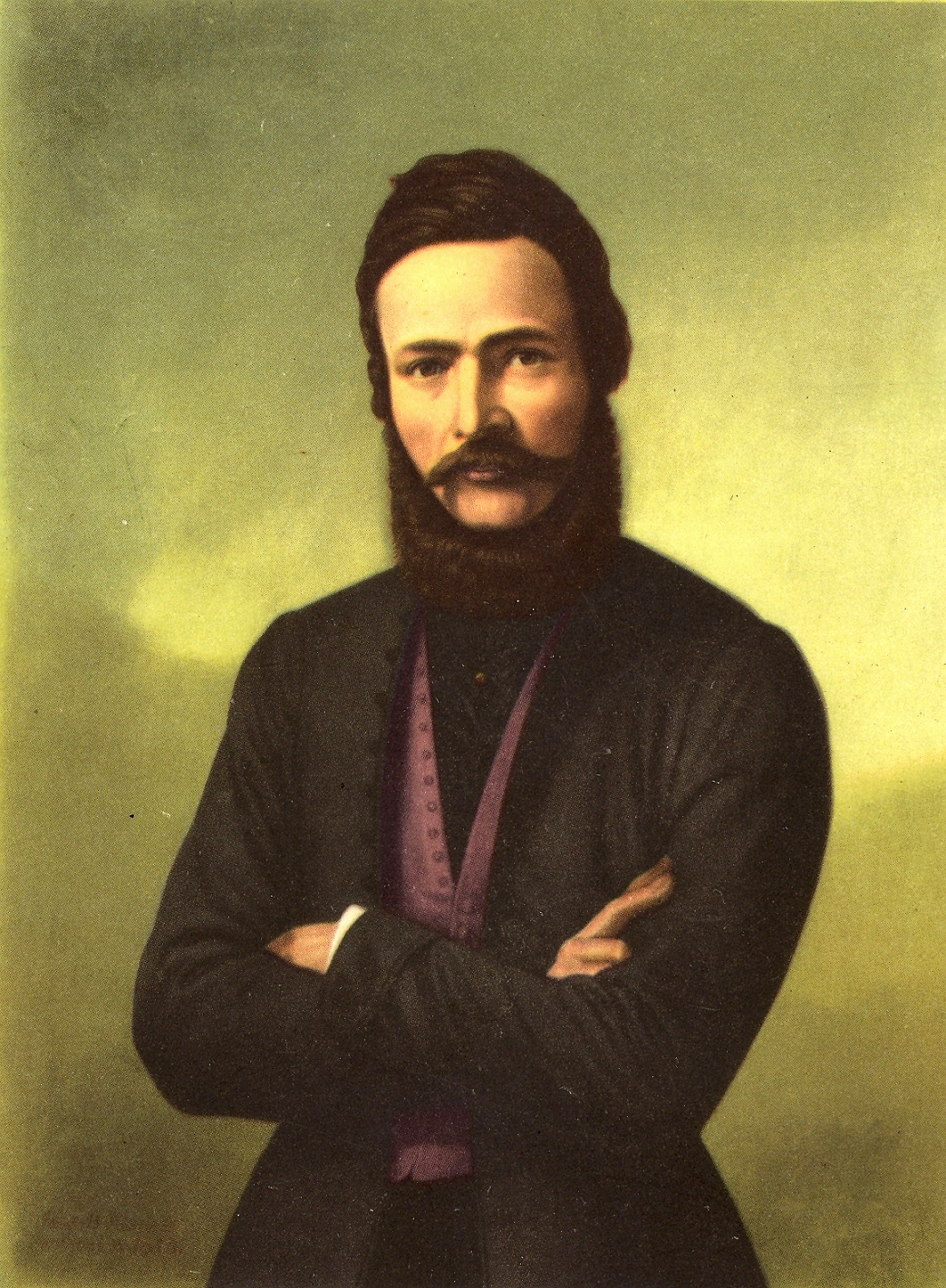
Ľudovít Štúr

The ascent that became most memorable in Slovak culture was by Ľudovít Štúr, then a 25-year-old teaching assistant of Slovak at the Bratislava Lutheran Lýceum (a preparatory high school and college). In the summer of 1841 he traveled through the Slovak counties with his private Greek student Prince Aristarchos and stopped at Michal Miloslav Hodža's parish at Liptovský Mikuláš, whose younger brother Juraj was Štúr's student at the lýceum. Štúr and a group of locals, Fejérpataky Belopotocký among them, hiked to the top of Kriváň on 16 August, its first recorded ascent that included women.

==== National excursions ====
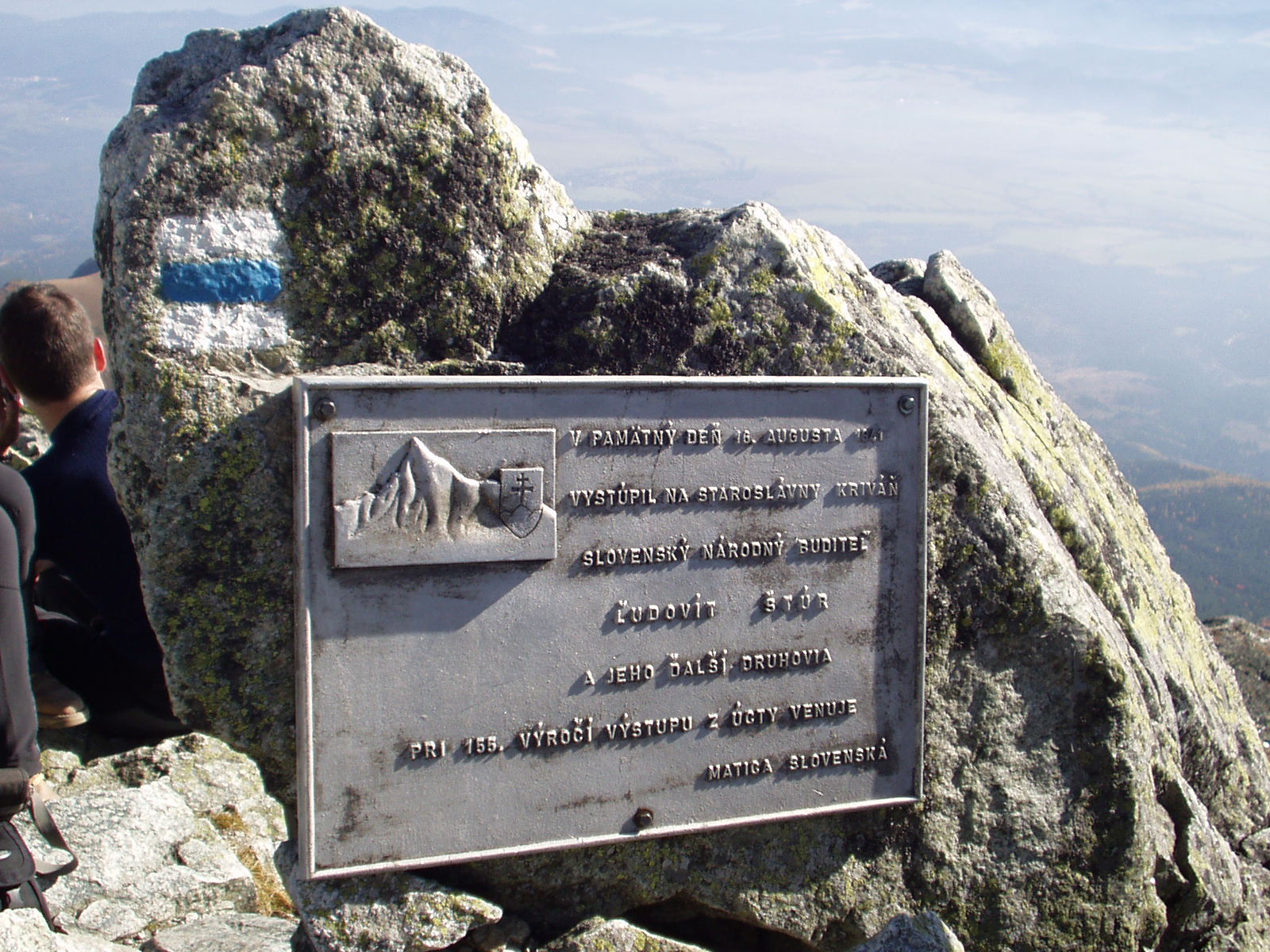
A summit plaque in memory of the 1841 ascent A blue-colored trail mark used in the Tatras

A similar hike, without Štúr, took place the following year, and then sporadically later. Their organizers called them "national excursions" with increasing frequency. They were constituted as an annual late-August event by the authorities at Poprad in 1955 in order to commemorate the anniversary of the uprising of 1944. The attendance reached 480 people in 1981. They have continued with a broader national designation through the present. The National Ascent of Kriváň (Národný výstup na Kriváň) is an annual two-day event on the third weekend in August organized by the Slovak Tourist Club, Matica slovenská, and the towns of Vysoké Tatry and Liptovský Mikuláš. The number of persons allowed to ascend the summit on each of the event days is limited to 300.

== Access ==
The three marked hiking routes to Kriváň start at different locations, but all ultimately converge at the elevation of about 2,145 m (7,035 ft.) for the final ca. 350-meter (1,150-foot) steep, rocky ascent to the summit − the only segment where both hands may be needed to maintain balance in places.

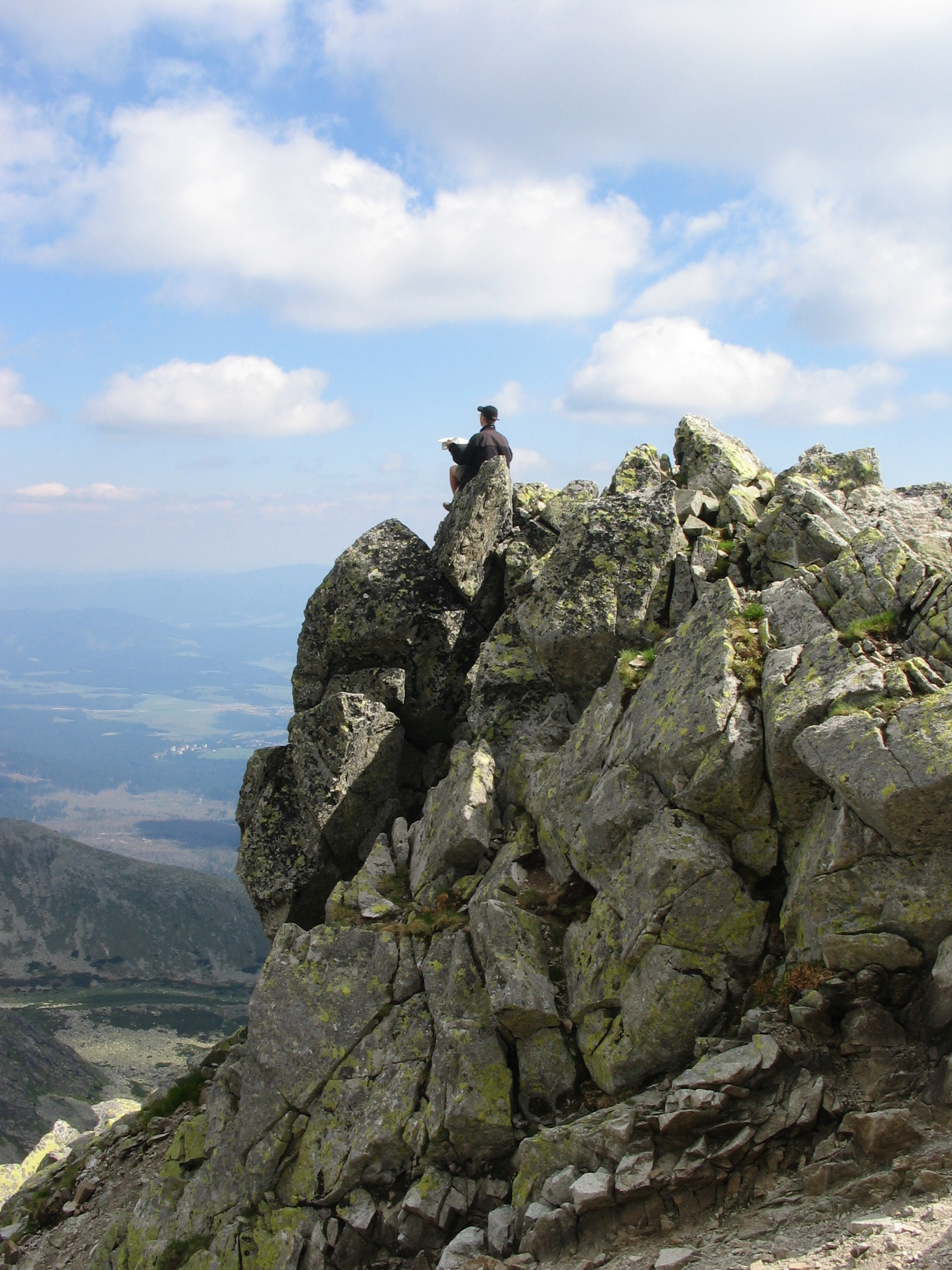
Ridge below summit

- The trailhead of the blue-marked trail is on the road between Štrbské Pleso and Pribylina, the color stays the same to the summit; elevation gain ca. 1,300 m (4,265 ft.).
- The green-marked trailhead is on the same road closer to Pribylina at Tri Studničky, the green trail links with the blue trail below the summit; elevation gain ca. 1,360 m (4,460 ft.).
- Hikers starting from Štrbské Pleso follow the red-marked trail towards Podbanské only to its intersection with the blue-marked trail at Jamské pleso from where they follow the blue trail to the summit; elevation gain ca. 1,150 m (3,770 ft.).

The historical winding road built by miners for horse-drawn ore carts and used by hikers in the past, including the participants of the revered 1841 excursion, is between the green and blue trails and links up with the green trail above the timberline below Priehyba Ridge. The road is not marked, the Tatra National Park management decreed it off limits. It is partly obscured by shrubby mountain pines at higher elevations.

Kriváň is a popular destination for hikers and is noted for its cultural significance and panoramic views. Polls of both the general public and experts have consistently ranked it as one of Slovakia's most beautiful mountains. The 360-degree view from the top is among the best in Slovakia with the scenery ranging from the populated valleys of upper Liptov, Spiš, and distant parts of Podhale, to the rugged drops of its north face, and many of the notable peaks of the Tatras including Giewont over Zakopane, Rysy, Lomnický štít, and Gerlach, the highest peak of the Carpathians. The panorama is framed by the Western and Low Tatras, and by mountain ranges beyond them in good visibility.

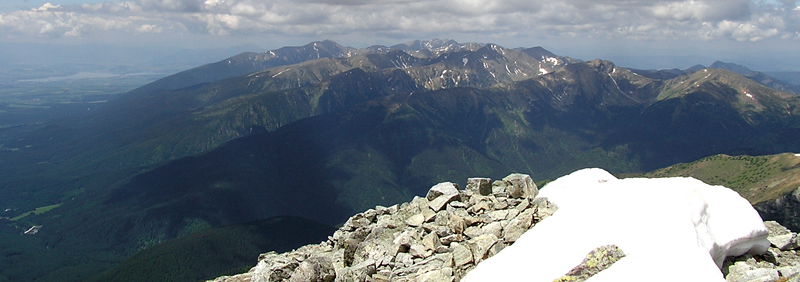
View of the Western Tatras from the summit of Kriváň

== Cultural images ==
=== Early development ===
The mountain is mentioned by Nikolai Gogol as the abode of two Cossack brothers, Ivan and Petro, in his short story 'The Terrible Vengeance', written in 1832.

After lower nobleman Gašpar Fejérpataky Belopotocký (1794–1874) published an account of his 1835 ascent of Kriváň in the literary journal Hronka in 1837, its editor-in-chief Karol Kuzmány (1806–1866) wrote the novella Ladislav (1838), whose title character, taking the long way home from Italy via Germany and the Polish Podhale, hikes to the summit of Kriváň where he and his friends talk about brotherhood among the Slavs, sing arousing songs, and imbibe Tokaj wine. Both works may have motivated the hike by Ľudovít Štúr and friends in 1841 that inspired him to write two poems published in 1842. Romantic poets soon became fervent admirers of the eye-catching mountain. Eugen V. Šparnensis (1827-after 1853) called Kriváň a marker of his homeland, the Slovaks were "Kriváň's children" for Janko Kráľ, Samo Chalupka's poem saw the mountain as a symbol of their place among the nations.

=== Popular culture ===
The significance the intellectuals began to ascribe to Kriváň and its images they created were gradually adopted by popular culture. An early instance is the poem Oh, Below Kriváň (Hej, pod Kriváňom; originally: Hej, pod Muráňom) by Samuel Tomášik (1813–1887), which came to be seen as an anonymous folk song and is sometimes featured as such on folk albums. Likewise, the Polish poem Kriváň, High Kriváň! (Krywaniu, Krywaniu wysoki!) by Kazimierz Przerwa-Tetmajer was labeled as a folk song and the author of the verses was not credited when its rock version by Skaldowie was released in 1972.

=== Visual arts ===
The short film Up the North Face of Kriváň (Severnou stenou na Kriváň; 1947) directed by Karol Skřipský with original music by Šimon Jurovský documented the first winter ascent of the Kriváň North Face, which, unlike the southern slopes of the massif, requires technical climbing. The mountain featured as an attractive backdrop in several films including Native Country (Rodná zem; dir. Josef Mach, 1954). It has appeared in numerous paintings, including by Ján Hála (1946), Miloš Alexander Bazovský (1956), Andrej Doboš (1967), and Ladislav Čemický (1979). The role of Kriváň in popular awareness and high culture was highlighted when a country-wide vote in 2005 selected it to be one of the images on Slovakia's euro coins.

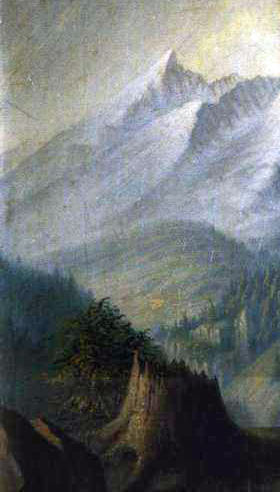
P. M. Bohúň, Kriváň from a larger painting, 1849

Krywań, Krywań, 1972 album cover

L. Čemický, "Below Kriváň," 1979

Coat of arms of Slovakia from 1960 to 1990

== See also ==
- "Lightning over the Tatras"
- Mountain Rescue Service (Slovakia)
