= Stalin Peak =

Stalin Peak may refer to the former name of:

- Ismoil Somoni Peak (Pamir), the highest point in Tajikistan and the former USSR
- Gerlach Peak (Carpathians)
