= Jelšava =

Jelšava Jolsva
- Municipality
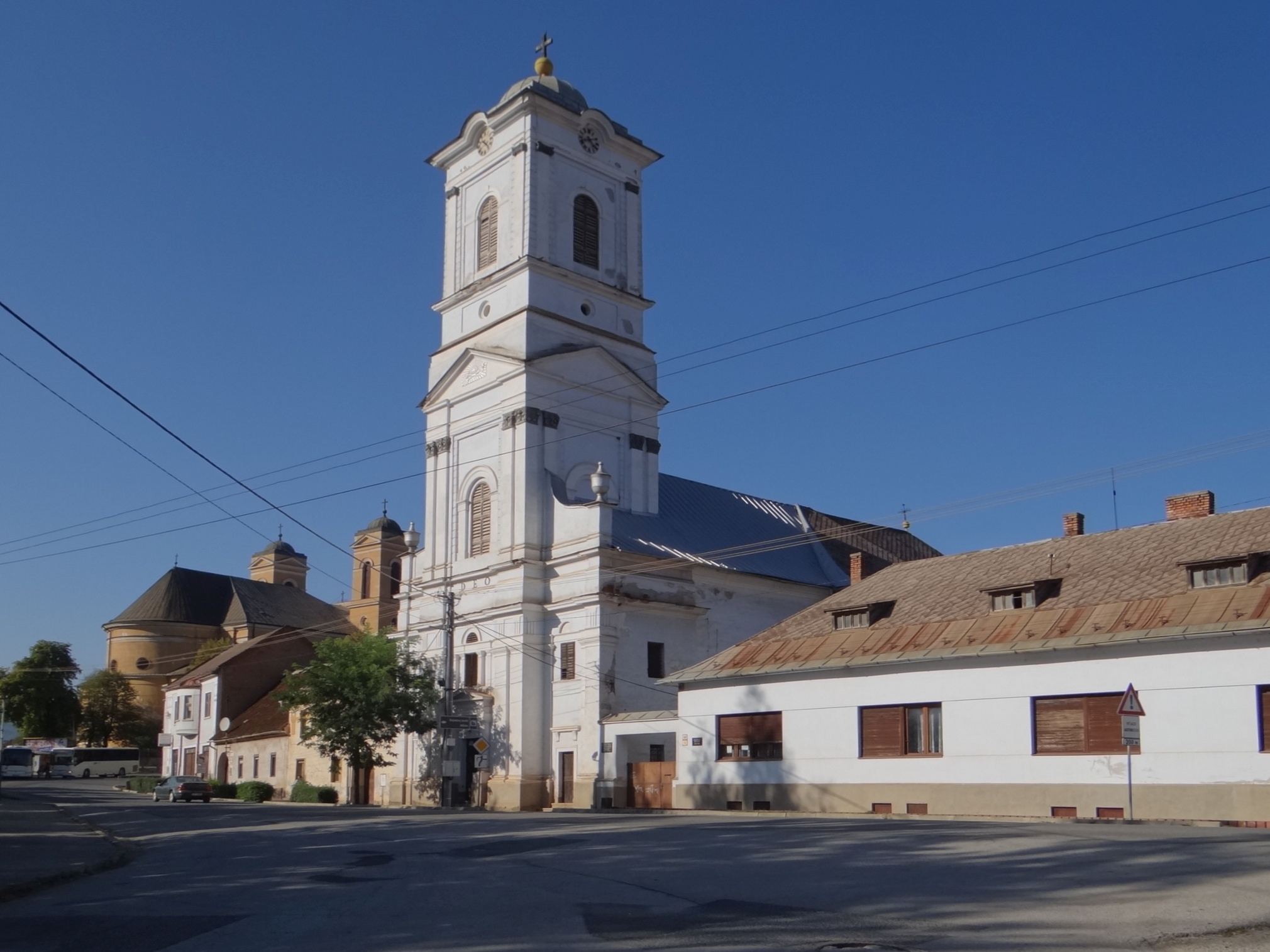
- Protestant church

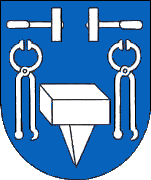
- Flag Coat of arms

- Location of Jelšava in the Banská Bystrica Region Location of Jelšava in Slovakia
- Coordinates: 48.63°N 20.24°E
- Country: Slovakia
- Region: Banská Bystrica Region
- District: Revúca District
- First mentioned: 1243

Government
  - Mayor: Milan Kolesár

Area
  - Total: 46.79 km^{2} (18.07 sq mi)
- Elevation: 258 m (846 ft)

Population (2025)
  - Total: 3,178
- Time zone: UTC+1 (CET)
  - Summer (DST): UTC+2 (CEST)
- Postal code: 491 6
- Area code: +421 58
- Vehicle registration plate (until 2022): RA
- Website: www.jelsava.sk

Jelšava (German: Eltsch or Jelschau; Hungarian: Jolsva) is a town and municipality in Revúca District in the Banská Bystrica Region of Slovakia.

== Etymology ==
The name is derived from Slovak jelša (alder). Jelšava means "a place overgrown with alders" or "a forest with alders".

== Geography ==
The municipality lies at an altitude of 258 metres (846 ft) and covers an area of 46.79 km^{2} (18.07 sq mi) (2025).

The town lies in the Revúcka vrchovina highlands at the border of the Slovak Ore Mountains and Slovak Karst, in the valley of the Muráň river, at an altitude of around 258 m. It is located by road around 10 km (6.21 mi) from Revúca, 100 km (62.14 mi) from Banská Bystrica and 105 km (65.24 mi) away from Košice.

Along to the main settlement, it also has "part" Teplá Voda, bit north-west of the town.

== History ==
In historical records, the town was first mentioned in 1243 (1243 Illswa, 1271 Elswa, 1344 Ilsua, 1564 Jelssawa, 1573 Jolssowa, 1582 Ölch alias Ilschwa, 1594 Oltcz, 1592 Jelsowa, Josuach) as an important town and hammer, hosting German and Hungarian colonists. In the time it was ruled by Desiderius of the Ratoldy family, who was the founder of a new family, the Ilsvay (meaning "from Jelšava"). In 1556, Jelšava was besieged by Turks, to whom it had to pay tributes. In this period Protestantism arrived in the town. It was ruled by Ottoman Empire as part of Filek sanjak (Its centre was Rima Sonbot) during periods of 1554-1593 and 1596–1686. It was known as "Yoşva" during Ottoman period. In the 17th century, Jelšava passed to the Bocskay family. The first magnesite furnace in present-day Slovakia was built in 1894. After breakup of Austria-Hungary in 1918, the town passed to Czechoslovakia, which controlled the town lied until 1993, with exception of years 1938–1945, when it was occupied by Hungary (see First Vienna Award). In 1993, the town became a part of Slovakia.

== Population ==
Historical population
Year	Pop.	±%
1970	3,538	—
1980	2,959	−16.4%
1991	2,508	−15.2%
2001	3,287	+31.1%
2011	3,229	−1.8%
2021	3,209	−0.6%
Source: Censuses

Population statistic (10 years)
Year	1995	2005	2015	2025
Count	2955	3147	3191	3178
Difference		+6.49%	+1.39%	−0.40%

Population statistic
Year	2024	2025
Count	3177	3178
Difference		+0.03%

It has a population of 3178 people (31 December 2025).

=== Ethnicity ===
Census 2021 (1+ %)
Ethnicity	Number	Fraction
Slovak	2651	82.61%
Not found out	382	11.9%
Romani	312	9.72%
Hungarian	42	1.3%
Total	3209	

In year 2021 was 3209 people by ethnicity 2651 as Slovak, 382 as Not found out, 312 as Romani, 42 as Hungarian, 17 as Czech, 4 as Ukrainian, 4 as Other, 2 as Polish, 1 as Vietnamese, 1 as Italian, 1 as Rusyn, 1 as Russian, 1 as Romanian, 1 as Austrian and 1 as German.

Note on population: The difference values of population numbers in the table "Population statistic" and in the sections "Ethnicity" & "Religion" is caused by the use of various statistical methods.

=== Religion ===
Census 2021 (1+ %)
Religion	Number	Fraction
None	1425	44.41%
Roman Catholic Church	775	24.15%
Not found out	524	16.33%
Evangelical Church	334	10.41%
Greek Catholic Church	68	2.12%
Jehovah's Witnesses	44	1.37%
Total	3209	

In year 2021 was 3209 people by religion 1425 from None, 775 from Roman Catholic Church, 524 from Not found out, 334 from Evangelical Church, 68 from Greek Catholic Church, 44 from Jehovah's Witnesses, 18 from Baptists Church, 5 from Calvinist Church, 4 from Christian Congregations in Slovakia, 3 from Other, 3 from Apostolic Church, 2 from Eastern Orthodox Church, 2 from United Methodist Church, 1 from Islam and 1 from Seventh-day Adventist Church.

== Twin towns — sister cities ==
Jelšava is twinned with:

- Uničov, Czech Republic
- Tótkomlós, Hungary
- Nădlac, Romania
- Szczekociny, Poland

== Famous people ==
- Ludwig Greiner, forester

== See also ==
- List of municipalities and towns in Slovakia

== Genealogical resources ==
The records for genealogical research are available at the state archive "Statny Archiv in Banska Bystrica, Kosice, Slovakia"

- Roman Catholic Church records (births/marriages/deaths): 1674-1895 (parish A)
- Greek Catholic Church records (births/marriages/deaths): 1775-1928 (parish B)
- Lutheran Church records (births/marriages/deaths): 1783-1895 (parish A)
