= Gerlachov, Bardejov District =

Gerlachov
- Municipality
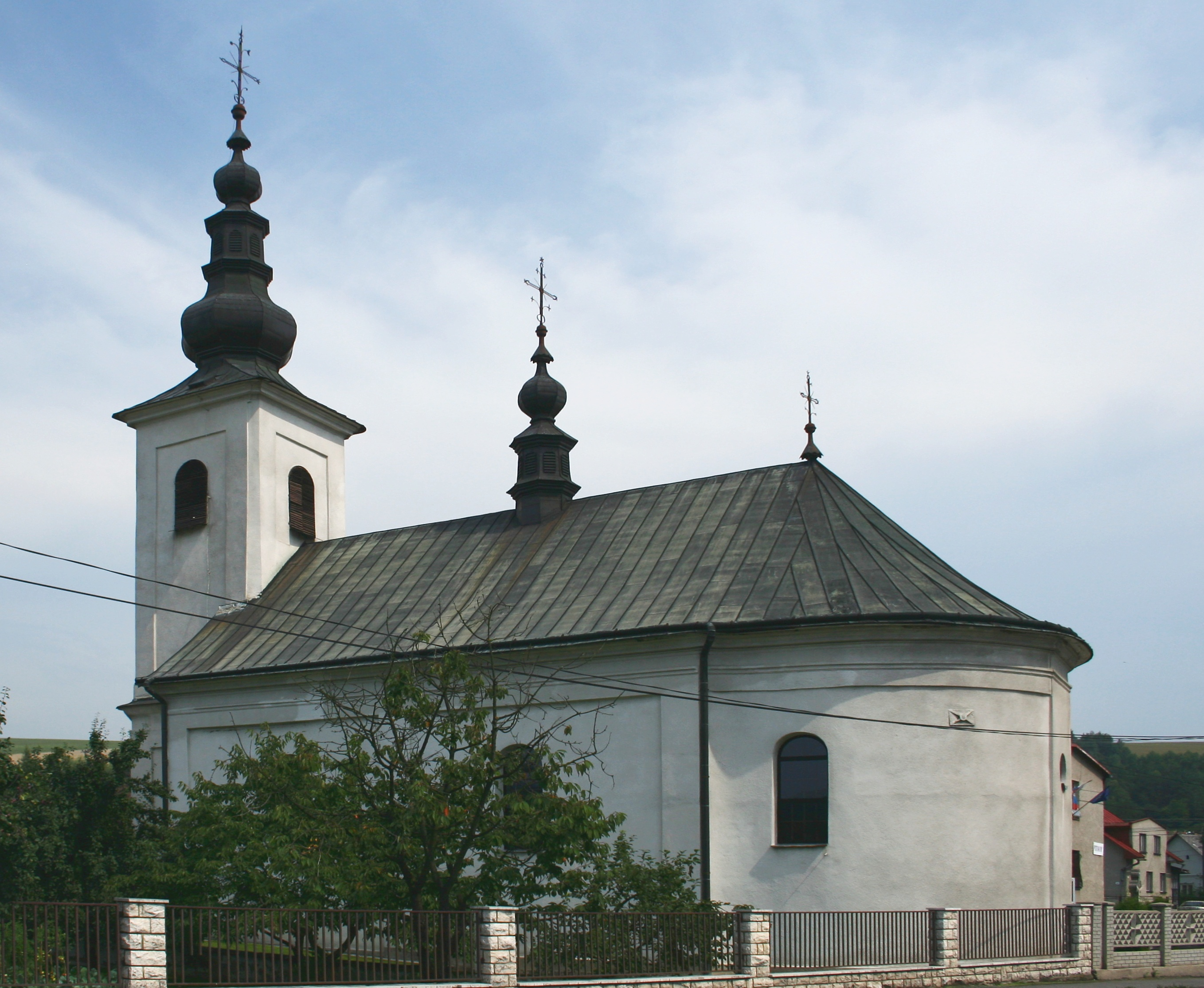

- Flag

- Location of Gerlachov in the Prešov Region Location of Gerlachov in Slovakia
- Coordinates: 49.32°N 21.11°E
- Country: Slovakia
- Region: Prešov Region
- District: Bardejov District
- First mentioned: 1326

Area
  - Total: 8.89 km^{2} (3.43 sq mi)
- Elevation: 354 m (1,161 ft)

Population (2025)
  - Total: 1,060
- Time zone: UTC+1 (CET)
  - Summer (DST): UTC+2 (CEST)
- Postal code: 860 4
- Area code: +421 54
- Vehicle registration plate (until 2022): BJ
- Website: www.gerlachov-bj.sk

Gerlachov (Hungarian: Gerla) is a village and municipality in Bardejov District in the Prešov Region of north-east Slovakia.

== History ==
In historical records the village was first mentioned in 1326.

The name is derived from the Germanic name Gerlach with Slavic suffix -ov.

Before the establishment of independent Czechoslovakia in 1918, Gerlachov was part of Sáros County within the Kingdom of Hungary. From 1939 to 1945, it was part of the Slovak Republic. On 20 January 1945, the Red Army dislodged the Wehrmacht from Gerlachov and it was once again part of Czechoslovakia.

== Geography ==
The municipality lies at an altitude of 354 metres (1,161 ft) and covers an area of 8.89 km^{2} (3.43 sq mi) (2025).

== Population ==
Population statistic (10 years)
Year	1995	2005	2015	2025
Count	934	1018	1053	1060
Difference		+8.99%	+3.43%	+0.66%

Population statistic
Year	2024	2025
Count	1055	1060
Difference		+0.47%

It has a population of 1060 people (31 December 2025).

=== Ethnicity ===
Census 2021 (1+ %)
Ethnicity	Number	Fraction
Slovak	933	88.35%
Rusyn	267	25.28%
Romani	127	12.02%
Not found out	32	3.03%
Total	1056	

In year 2021 was 1056 people by ethnicity 933 as Slovak, 267 as Rusyn, 127 as Romani, 32 as Not found out, 3 as Czech, 3 as Ukrainian, 2 as Russian, 1 as Irish, 1 as Italian, 1 as Hungarian and 1 as Other.

Note on population: The difference values of population numbers in the table "Population statistic" and in the sections "Ethnicity" & "Religion" is caused by the use of various statistical methods.

=== Religion ===
Census 2021 (1+ %)
Religion	Number	Fraction
Greek Catholic Church	432	40.91%
Eastern Orthodox Church	392	37.12%
Roman Catholic Church	105	9.94%
None	81	7.67%
Not found out	14	1.33%
Evangelical Church	12	1.14%
Jehovah's Witnesses	11	1.04%
Total	1056	

In year 2021 was 1056 people by religion 432 from Greek Catholic Church, 392 from Eastern Orthodox Church, 105 from Roman Catholic Church, 81 from None, 14 from Not found out, 12 from Evangelical Church, 11 from Jehovah's Witnesses, 3 from Church of Jesus Christ of Latter-day Saints, 2 from Ad hoc movements, 1 from Calvinist Church, 1 from Other and not ascertained christian church, 1 from Christian Congregations in Slovakia and 1 from Buddhism.

== Genealogical resources ==
The records for genealogical research are available at the state archive "Statny Archiv in Levoca, Presov, Slovakia"

- Roman Catholic church records (births/marriages/deaths): 1792-1899 (parish B)
- Greek Catholic church records (births/marriages/deaths): 1769-1896 (parish B)
- Lutheran church records (births/marriages/deaths): 1710-1895 (parish B)

== See also ==
- List of municipalities and towns in Slovakia
