= Robert Townson (natural historian) =

English natural historian and traveller

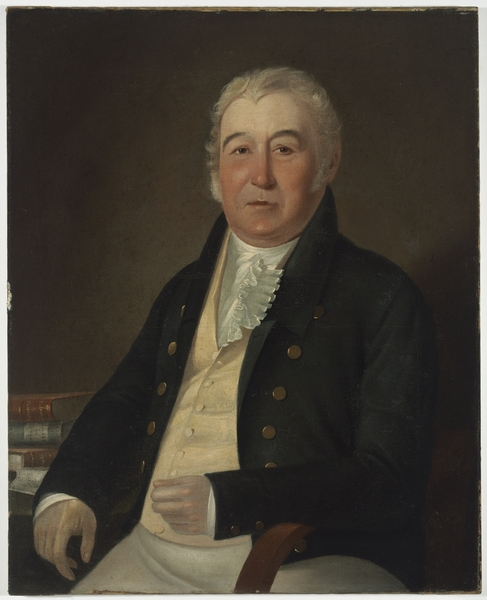
- Portrait by Augustus Earle, c. 1826
- Born: 1762; Richmond, Surrey
- Died: 27 June 1827 (aged 64–65); New South Wales
- Burial place: Parramatta
- Citizenship: Australia
- Occupation: Doctor - Historian

Dr Robert Townson MD FRSE LLD (1762 – 27 June 1827) was an English natural historian, traveller, mineralogist and doctor who emigrated to New South Wales in 1806.

== Early life ==
He was born at Richmond, Surrey, the youngest (and illegitimate) child of John Townson (1721–1773) and Sarah Aldcroft née Shewell (1731–1805). His father was a London merchant, his mother was from the Shewell business family, and she was married at the time of his birth to Charles Aldcroft, a haberdasher. His parents married in 1766, and John Townson died in 1774. From 1777 the Townson family were in Shropshire.

Townson, however, was an apprentice in Manchester from about the time the family moved. He didn't wish to enter commerce, and led an itinerant life that started around 1783.

== European travels ==
In 1787 Townson was studying under the chemist Balthasar Georges Sage at the École des Mines. In 1788 he became a student at the University of Edinburgh. He was elected a Fellow of the Royal Society of Edinburgh in 1791, proposed by James Hutton, Alexander Monro (secundus) and William Wright.

In 1793 Townson made a journey through parts of the Kingdom of Hungary. That year he made the first recorded ascents of Kriváň, a peak in the High Tatras now in Slovakia, of Lomnický štít and of Jahňací štít. In 1795 he graduated M.D. at Göttingen University.

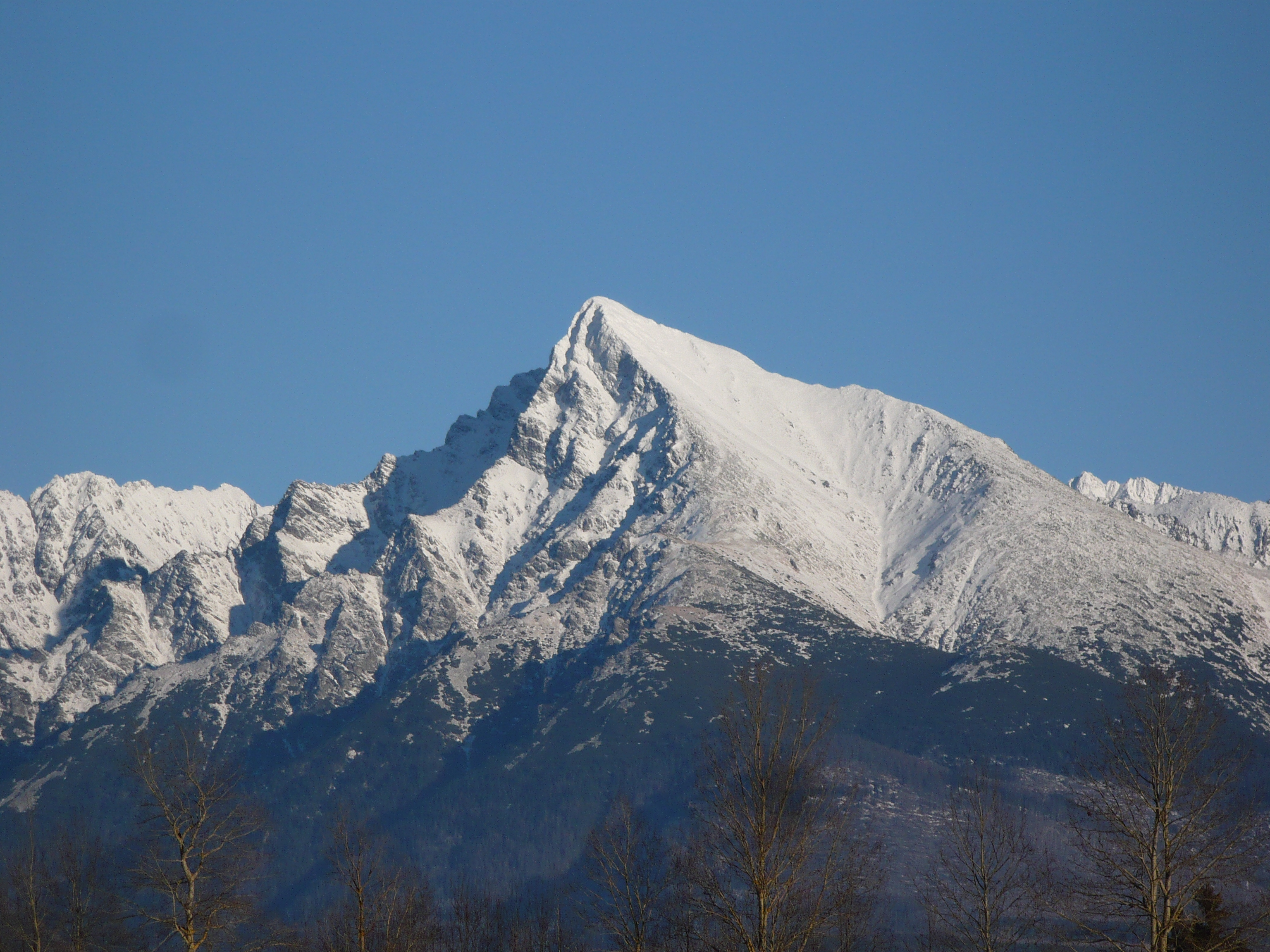
Kriváň peak, now in Slovakia, of which Robert Townson made the first recorded ascent in 1793

Townson was living in Shropshire, at Lydley Hayes near Cardington, when in 1800 Arthur Aikin was seeking him out for assistance on mineralogy. The General View of Agriculture survey for the county edited by Joseph Plymley (also Corbett, surname changed in 1804) in 1803 contained material published by Townson. His sister Ann had married John Witts (1750–1816), who became vicar of Cardington in 1774.

== Australian life ==
Townson aimed to use his knowledge of mineralogy in India, but failed to find work there. At the home of Sir Joseph Banks he met William Paterson, of the New South Wales Corps. His brother John of the Royal Marines was in Australia, returning to England in 1800 for a visit. Townson went there, setting off from England at the end of 1806. He became one of the opponents of William Bligh in the Rum Rebellion, and received a land grant.

Subsequently, Townson showed dissatisfaction with his Australian venture. Firstly all the land grants made after the Rum Rebellion were cancelled. Lachlan Macquarie who replaced Bligh visited Townson at home at Kogarah Bay, and replacement grants of land were made, with Townson and his brother having a land grant at Varroville, New South Wales; but Townson did nothing to accept the land until Macquarie left office. He thought the land unsuitable, made plans to return to the United Kingdom that fell through, and became reclusive.

Townson succeeded in his farming and wine growing. In 1822 he was elected to the Agricultural Society of New South Wales He died on 27 June 1827, and was buried in Parramatta.

== Works ==
Townson published:

- Observationes physiologicæ de Amphibiis, Göttingen, 1794
- Travels in Hungary London, 1797. The book contains an account of Townson's exploration of the Tatra Mountains, in which he was accompanied by Thomas Mauksch. It was published with a map supplement, by Johann Matthias Korabinsky (János Mátyás Korabinszky).
- The Philosophy of Mineralogy, London, 1798
- Tracts and Observations in Natural History and Physiology, London, 1799. This work includes the discovery, claimed as original to Townsend, of how tortoises breathe, in the absence of a thoracic diaphragm.

He contributed a paper "Perceptivity of Plants" to the Transactions of the Linnean Society (ii. 267).
