= Gerlachs Park =

Park in Malmö, Sweden

Coordinates: 55°36′32″N 13°1′56″E

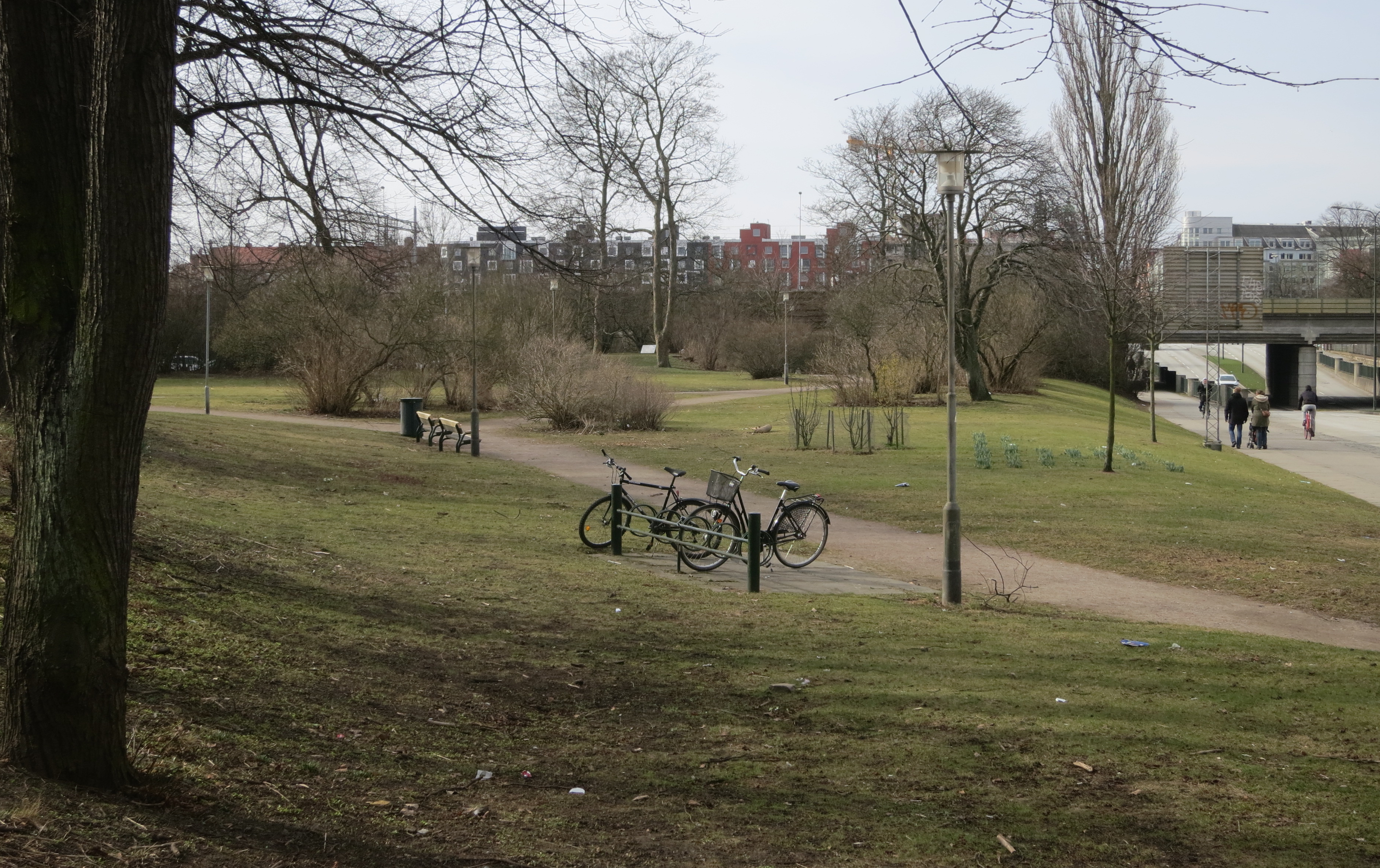
Gerlachs Park

Gerlachs park is a park in Malmö, Sweden. In medieval times, this was one of Malmö's execution sites, and it was used for burning of those considered to be witches from 1543 to 1663. The site was later used as a burial ground for poor soldiers of Malmö garrison (1809–1870) and for prisoners from Malmö Castle (1827–1891).

The park is named after Oscar Gerlach (1836–1900), a Danish-Swedish engineer and military officer.
