= Hrabušice =

Hrabušice Káposztafalva
- Municipality
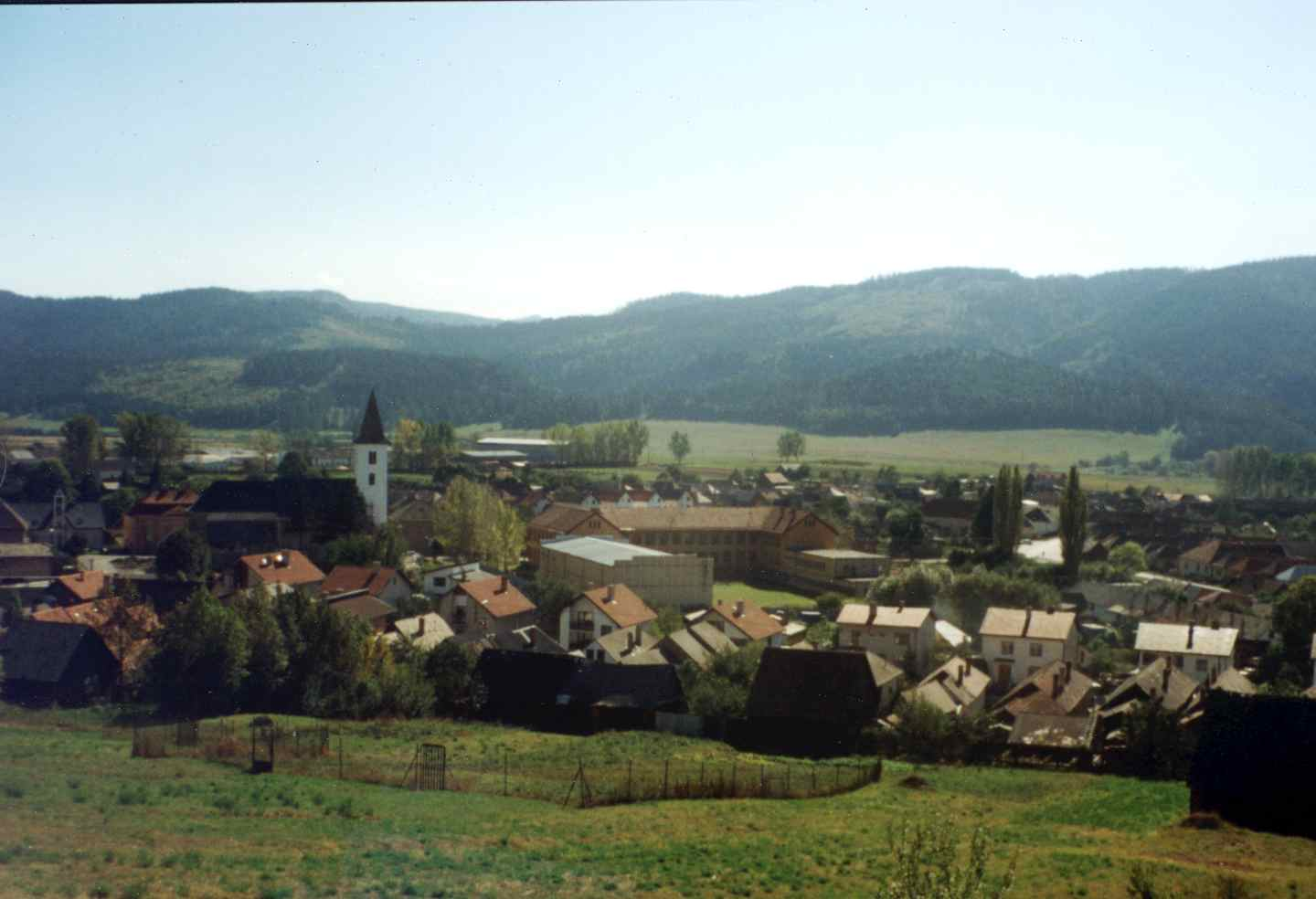

- Flag Coat of arms

- Location of Hrabušice in the Košice Region Location of Hrabušice in Slovakia
- Coordinates: 48.98°N 20.42°E
- Country: Slovakia
- Region: Košice Region
- District: Spišská Nová Ves District
- First mentioned: 1279

Government
  - Mayor: Marcel Kacvinský (HLAS-SD, SME RODINA, SNS)

Area
  - Total: 40.88 km^{2} (15.78 sq mi)
- Elevation: 542 m (1,778 ft)

Population (2025)
  - Total: 2,599
- Time zone: UTC+1 (CET)
  - Summer (DST): UTC+2 (CEST)
- Postal code: 531 5
- Area code: +421 53
- Vehicle registration plate (until 2022): SN
- Website: www.hrabusice.sk

Hrabušice (Hungarian: Káposztafalva) is a village and municipality in the Spišská Nová Ves District in the Košice Region of central-eastern Slovakia. Hrabušice is the starting point for the walks through Slovak karst region. Tourism is a major local employer here.

== History ==
The village was first mentioned in local records in 1279. It contains the 13th century Church of St. Laurence, and the ruins of a Carthusian monastery, built about 1305 on the site of a refuge used during the period of the Tatar invasions.

== Geography ==
The municipality lies at an altitude of 542 metres (1,778 ft) and covers an area of 40.88 km^{2} (15.78 sq mi) (2025).

== Population ==
Population statistic (10 years)
Year	1995	2005	2015	2025
Count	2051	2255	2469	2599
Difference		+9.94%	+9.49%	+5.26%

Population statistic
Year	2024	2025
Count	2602	2599
Difference		−0.11%

It has a population of 2599 people (31 December 2025).

=== Ethnicity ===
Census 2021 (1+ %)
Ethnicity	Number	Fraction
Slovak	2491	96.43%
Romani	150	5.8%
Not found out	62	2.4%
Total	2583	

In year 2021 was 2583 people by ethnicity 2491 as Slovak, 150 as Romani, 62 as Not found out, 13 as Czech, 7 as Rusyn, 4 as Polish, 1 as Ukrainian, 1 as Italian, 1 as Hungarian and 1 as Other.

Note on population: The difference values of population numbers in the table "Population statistic" and in the sections "Ethnicity" & "Religion" is caused by the use of various statistical methods.

=== Religion ===
Census 2021 (1+ %)
Religion	Number	Fraction
Roman Catholic Church	2081	80.57%
None	315	12.2%
Not found out	104	4.03%
Total	2583	

In year 2021 was 2583 people by religion 2081 from Roman Catholic Church, 315 from None, 104 from Not found out, 19 from Evangelical Church, 17 from Greek Catholic Church, 16 from Christian Congregations in Slovakia, 6 from Calvinist Church, 6 from Eastern Orthodox Church, 6 from Jehovah's Witnesses, 3 from Other, 2 from Paganism and natural spirituality, 2 from Buddhism, 1 from Other and not ascertained christian church, 1 from United Methodist Church, 1 from Seventh-day Adventist Church, 1 from Baptists Church, 1 from Apostolic Church and 1 from Ad hoc movements.

== Genealogical resources ==
The records for genealogical research are available at the state archive "Statny Archiv in Levoca, Slovakia"

- Roman Catholic church records (births/marriages/deaths): 1703-1903 (parish A)
- Lutheran church records (births/marriages/deaths): 1788-1910 (parish B)

== See also ==
- List of municipalities and towns in Slovakia
