= Gerlach =

Gerlach is a male forename of Germanic origin, variations of which exist in many Germanic and Romance languages. Like many other early Germanic names, it is dithematic, consisting of two meaningful constituents put together. In this case, those constituents are ger (meaning 'spear') and /la:k / (meaning 'motion'). The meaning of the name is thus 'spear thrower'.
It became a surname, and a source from which other surnames have been derived, as well.

== Personal name ==
- Saint Gerlach (died c. 1170), Dutch saint
- Gerlach I of Isenburg-Arnfels, Count of Isenburg-Arnfels from 1286 (1287) until 1303
- Gerlach I of Isenburg-Wied, Count of Isenburg-Wied from 1409 until 1413
- Gerlach I of Nassau-Wiesbaden (before 1288-1361), Count of Nassau
- Gerlach II of Isenburg-Arnfels, Count of Isenburg-Arnfels from 1333 until 1379
- Gerlach II of Isenburg-Covern, Count of Isenburg-Covern from 1158 until 1217
- Gerlach III of Isenburg-Covern, Count of Isenburg-Covern from 1217 until 1235
- Gerlach IV of Isenburg-Limburg (died 1289), Lord of Limburg an der Lahn
- Gerlach V of Isenburg-Limburg (died 1355), Count of Isenburg-Limburg; grandson of Gerlach IV
- Gerlach VI of Isenburg-Limburg (died 1365), Count of Isenburg-Limburg and Lord of Limburg an der Lahn; son of Gerlach V
- Gerlach Flicke (fl. 1545-1558), German portrait painter of the English Tudor court
- Gerlach Cornelis Joannes van Reenen (1818–1893), Dutch politician

== Surname ==
- Annette Gerlach (born 1964), German TV host
- Carl Gotthelf Gerlach (1704–1761), German organist and music director
- Carl Ludvig Gerlach (1832–1893), Danish composer and opera singer
- Carl R. Gerlach, mayor of Overland Park, Kansas
- Charles L. Gerlach (1895-1947), U.S. Representative from Pennsylvania
- Chris Gerlach (born 1964), American politician
- Christian Gerlach, professor of modern history at the University of Bern
- Daniel Gerlach (born 1977), German journalist
- Dave Gerlach (1940–2020), Canadian curler
- Elsie Gerlach, 20th century dental educator
- Ernst Ludwig von Gerlach (1795-1877), Prussian judge and politician
- Heinrich Gerlach (1908–1991), Nazi soldier and writer
- Hellmut von Gerlach (1866-1935), German journalist and politician
- Jim Gerlach (born 1955), U.S. Congressman from Pennsylvania
- Joseph von Gerlach (1820-1896), German anatomist and professor
- Judith Gerlach (born 1985), German politician
- Kurt Albert Gerlach (1886-1922), German sociologist
- Ludwig Friedrich Leopold von Gerlach (1790-1861), Prussian general
- Manfred Gerlach (1928-2011), head of state of East Germany (1989-1990)
- Otto von Gerlach (1801-1849), German theologian and pastor
- Talitha Gerlach (1896–1995), American YMCA worker who spent most of her life as a social worker in Shanghai, China
- Walther Gerlach (1889-1979), German physicist
- Wim Gerlach (1935-2007), Dutch Olympic boxer
- Irene Gerlach, fictional character in Erich Kästner's Lottie and Lisa

== Place ==
- Gerlach, a census-designated place in the U.S. state of Nevada
- Gerlachovský štít also known as Gerlach, the highest mountain peak in Slovakia

== See also ==
- Gerlach Barklow Co., American manufacturer of art calendars
- Rudolf Gerlach-Rusnak (1895-1960), Ukrainian-born German tenor
- Adrien de Gerlache
- Gerlachov (disambiguation)
