= Elsie Gerlach =

Dr. Elsie Gerlach (1900-1967) was named the first superintendent of the University of Illinois at Chicago College of Dentistry Children's Clinic in 1927 after having served as an instructor at the University of Pennsylvania. Gerlach stayed for 38 years and became nationally known and respected as a pioneer in the teaching and development of pediatric dentistry. In the early years of the clinic, she looked for children on the street who needed dental care and brought them to the clinic.

While working at the college, she was also a teacher and administrator at LaRabida Sanitarium, the Crippled Children's Hospital, and the Chicago Child Care Society. Active with the American Society of Dentistry since its inception, the organization awarded her its first-ever life membership in 1962. She was the first president of the Illinois ASDC. She also was a founder of the American Academy of Pediatric Dentistry.
