= Gerlachov, Poprad District =

Gerlachov
- Municipality
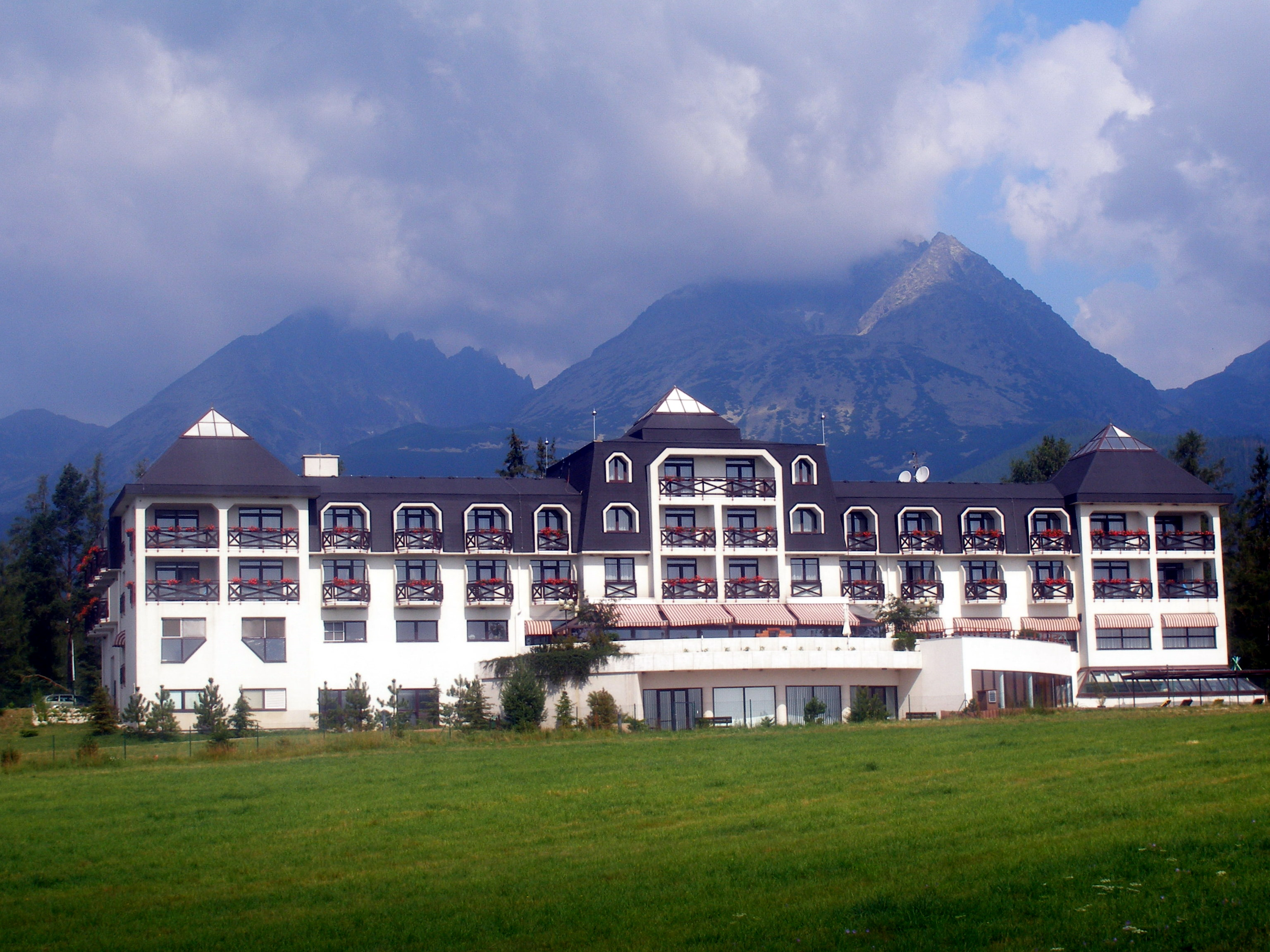

- Flag Coat of arms

- Location of Gerlachov in the Prešov Region Location of Gerlachov in Slovakia
- Coordinates: 49.10°N 20.23°E
- Country: Slovakia
- Region: Prešov Region
- District: Poprad District
- First mentioned: 1326

Area
  - Total: 5.26 km^{2} (2.03 sq mi)
- Elevation: 790 m (2,590 ft)

Population (2025)
  - Total: 869
- Time zone: UTC+1 (CET)
  - Summer (DST): UTC+2 (CEST)
- Postal code: 593 5
- Area code: +421 52
- Vehicle registration plate (until 2022): PP
- Website: www.obecgerlachov.sk

Gerlachov (German: Gerlsdorf; Hungarian: Gerlachfalva) is a village and municipality in Poprad District in the Prešov Region of northern Slovakia, under the High Tatras. It historically belongs to the Spiš region.

== History ==
In historical records the village was first mentioned in 1326. The village was established by German gold miners, hence the two crossed hammers in the village's coat-of-arms, however, it isn't exactly known when it was established, probably around 1200. The name isn't of certain origin: it could stem from the then mayor of Spišská Sobota (now part of Poprad), Gerlach, or from a leader of colonizers, or from Geröll, a name for rough stones close to the stream Stará voda.

== Geography ==
The municipality lies at an altitude of 790 metres (2,590 ft) and covers an area of 5.26 km^{2} (2.03 sq mi) (2025).

== Population ==
Population statistic (10 years)
Year	1995	2005	2015	2025
Count	761	804	828	869
Difference		+5.65%	+2.98%	+4.95%

Population statistic
Year	2024	2025
Count	864	869
Difference		+0.57%

It has a population of 869 people (31 December 2025).

=== Ethnicity ===
Census 2021 (1+ %)
Ethnicity	Number	Fraction
Slovak	753	90.17%
Romani	64	7.66%
Not found out	51	6.1%
Czech	10	1.19%
Total	835	

In year 2021 was 835 people by ethnicity 753 as Slovak, 64 as Romani, 51 as Not found out, 10 as Czech, 3 as Rusyn, 3 as German and 2 as Hungarian.

Note on population: The difference values of population numbers in the table "Population statistic" and in the sections "Ethnicity" & "Religion" is caused by the use of various statistical methods.

=== Religion ===
Census 2021 (1+ %)
Religion	Number	Fraction
Roman Catholic Church	314	37.6%
Evangelical Church	246	29.46%
None	127	15.21%
Not found out	47	5.63%
Seventh-day Adventist Church	38	4.55%
Greek Catholic Church	19	2.28%
Total	835	

In year 2021 was 835 people by religion 314 from Roman Catholic Church, 246 from Evangelical Church, 127 from None, 47 from Not found out, 38 from Seventh-day Adventist Church, 19 from Greek Catholic Church, 8 from Christian Congregations in Slovakia, 8 from Baptists Church, 8 from Apostolic Church, 5 from United Methodist Church, 4 from Old Catholic Church, 4 from Ad hoc movements, 3 from Eastern Orthodox Church, 2 from Buddhism, 1 from Jehovah's Witnesses and 1 from Other.
