= Lomnický štít =

Mountain in Slovakia

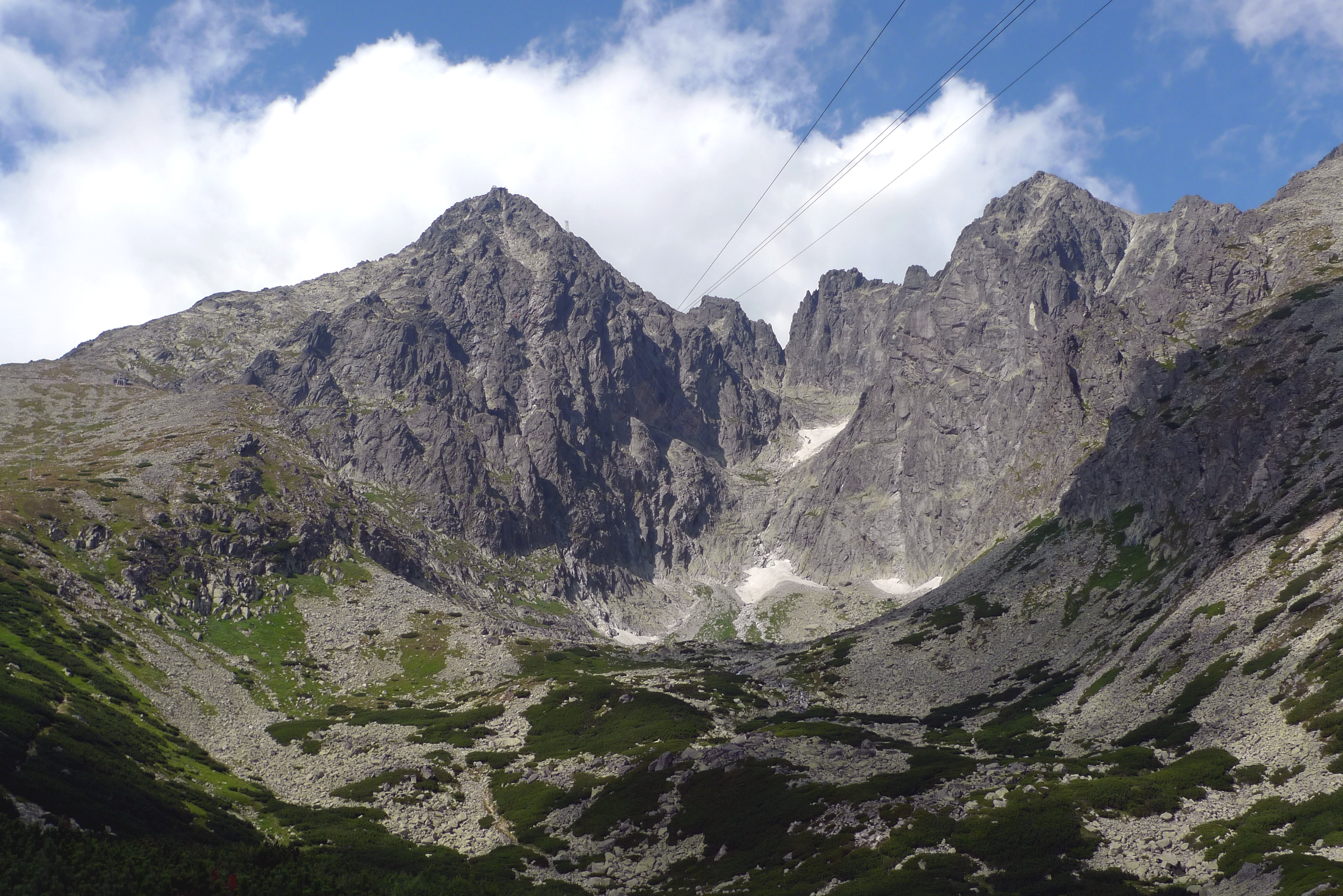
- Lomnický štít (left) and Kežmarský štít (2558 m)

Highest point
- Elevation: 2,634.4 m (8,643 ft)
- Prominence: 434 m (1,424 ft)
- Coordinates: 49°11′45″N 20°12′46″E

Naming
- Nickname: Lomničák

Geography
- Location within Slovakia
- Location: Tatra National Park, Poprad, Prešov, Slovakia
- Parent range: High Tatras

Climbing
- First ascent: Štefan Fábry, around 1760-1790
- Easiest route: cable car

Lomnický štít (English: Lomnica Peak or Lomnický Peak, Hungarian: Lomnici-csúcs, German: Lomnitzer Spitze, Polish: Łomnica) is one of the highest and most visited mountain peaks in the High Tatras mountains of Slovakia. Connected by cable car to Tatranská Lomnica, its summit is 2,634 metres (8,642 ft) above sea level, making it the second highest peak in the High Tatras after Gerlachovský štít (2654 m).

Local shoemaker and amateur miner Jakab Fábry stated he made an ascent around 1760–1790, but the first recorded ascent was made by the English traveler Robert Townson and guide on 16 August 1793. He measured the elevation of the peak to be 2633 m, a meter below the actual elevation. The first winter ascent was made in 1891.

In the past, Lomnický štít was called as Vater (Father), Grossvater (Grandfather), Königsberg (King's Mountain), Królowa Tatr and Królowa Tatrzańska (Princess of the Tatra), Petra altissima kesmarkiensis and allerhöchster Kaisermärkerfels (Highest cliff of Kežmarok), höchste Kaisermärker Spitze (Highest peak of Kežmarok), késmárki hegyek (Hills of Kežmarok), Kesmarker Spitze or Lumnitzer Spitze (Peak of Kežmarok or Peak of Lomnica).

Since 1940, tourists have reached the peak by cable car. They are allowed to stay on the peak for 50 minutes. The cable car system is normally closed in the month of May for annual maintenance. It is also possible to climb the peak from Lomnický Saddle, but this is only permitted with a mountain guide.

There is a solar observatory and weather station permanently staffed year round at the terminus of the cable car.

== Access ==
After Gerlachovský štít is Lomnický štít the second most guided peak in High Tatras. The most used is the Classic route also known as Emericyho nárek. The path is popular mostly because of easy access. You can take a lift from Tatranská Lomnica up to Lomnické sedlo (2189 meters above sea level) and from there straight forward to the top. The harder sections of the path are secured by steel steps and chains.

Another very popular route is called Jordanova cesta. The route begins at Starý Smokovec and within 3 hours and 35 minutes of hiking you will end up at Téryho Chata, where the challenging section begins. The route from here is relatively hard for orientation, the steep sections are however secured by chains.

The route called Medené Lávky starts at chata pri Zelenom plese, heading along an unmarked sidewalk over a kneeling path to the Čierny štít massif. At the waterfall it climbs to the right to a pillar secured by chains. Afterwards it climbs the threshold of the Veľká zmrzlá dolina, crosses the stream and heads left to the Medená kotlina. Through rubble fields it reaches the main gutter, falling from the saddle between Kežmarok peaks. The path is very exposed to stone fall and recently is not as popular.

Gypsyho ferrata just like the classic route Emericyho nárek starts at Lomnické Sedlo, the real starting point is however hard to find. Gypsyho ferrata is secured with chains and steel steps, however full ferrata gear is due to extreme exposure in the upper section necessary.

The route through Cmiter starts at Skalnaté pleso, leading through Skalnatá dolina underneath to the massifs of Vidlové veže and Kežmarský štít. The route is exposed to stone fall. The harder sections require rope, since the path is not secured by any additional gear such as chains.

== Climate ==
The climate of Lomnický štít belongs to the alpine climate (Köppen: ET), because the altitude of the weather station reaches 2,635 metres (8,645 ft). The annual average temperature is −2.9 °C (26.8 °F), the hottest month is 5.6 °C (42.1 °F) in August, and the coldest month is −10.6 °C (12.9 °F) in February; the annual precipitation is 1,902.4 millimetres (74.90 in), and the average precipitation in all months is above 120 millimetres (4.7 in). The highest average precipitation is 193.7 millimetres (7.63 in). The earliest meteorological observations recorded by this weather station that can be retrieved at present are from 1952, so since 1952, the extreme temperature at this place has ranged from −31.2 °C (−24.2 °F) on March 3, 1987 to 24.0 °C (75.2 °F) on August 1, 1981; the highest minimum is 11.8 °C (53.2 °F) on August 3, 1998, while the lowest maximum is −27.8 °C (−18.0 °F) on January 31, 1956. Even in the warmest summer, the mountain rarely appears higher than 15 °C (59 °F) or more. Among them, the temperature records above 20 °C (68 °F) recorded only twice, which were 21.0 °C (69.8 °F) on June 28, 1973 and 24.0 °C (75.2 °F) at August 1981, respectively. In winter, low temperatures are often as low as −25.0 °C (−13.0 °F), and low temperatures below −30.0 °C (−22.0 °F) will occur under extremely cold.

Climate data for Lomnický štít (1991−2020 normals, extremes 1952–present)
Month	Jan	Feb	Mar	Apr	May	Jun	Jul	Aug	Sep	Oct	Nov	Dec	Year
Record high °C (°F)	5.0 (41.0)	6.2 (43.2)	7.5 (45.5)	10.0 (50.0)	16.0 (60.8)	21.0 (69.8)	19.5 (67.1)	24.0 (75.2)	14.5 (58.1)	13.0 (55.4)	11.1 (52.0)	10.0 (50.0)	24.0 (75.2)
Mean daily maximum °C (°F)	−7.3 (18.9)	−7.7 (18.1)	−5.8 (21.6)	−1.7 (28.9)	2.9 (37.2)	6.9 (44.4)	8.7 (47.7)	9.0 (48.2)	4.5 (40.1)	1.1 (34.0)	−2.7 (27.1)	−6.2 (20.8)	0.1 (32.2)
Daily mean °C (°F)	−10.1 (13.8)	−10.6 (12.9)	−8.9 (16.0)	−4.7 (23.5)	−0.2 (31.6)	3.5 (38.3)	5.2 (41.4)	5.6 (42.1)	1.6 (34.9)	−1.6 (29.1)	−5.3 (22.5)	−8.8 (16.2)	−2.9 (26.8)
Mean daily minimum °C (°F)	−12.9 (8.8)	−13.4 (7.9)	−11.8 (10.8)	−7.5 (18.5)	−2.9 (26.8)	0.6 (33.1)	2.4 (36.3)	2.9 (37.2)	−0.9 (30.4)	−4.1 (24.6)	−7.8 (18.0)	−11.5 (11.3)	−5.6 (21.9)
Record low °C (°F)	−30.8 (−23.4)	−30.0 (−22.0)	−31.3 (−24.3)	−22.8 (−9.0)	−17.0 (1.4)	−12.0 (10.4)	−8.0 (17.6)	−11.0 (12.2)	−12.2 (10.0)	−19.9 (−3.8)	−28.9 (−20.0)	−30.0 (−22.0)	−31.3 (−24.3)
Average precipitation mm (inches)	176.9 (6.96)	170.3 (6.70)	182.1 (7.17)	165.3 (6.51)	149.1 (5.87)	156.5 (6.16)	193.7 (7.63)	140.8 (5.54)	120.3 (4.74)	126.3 (4.97)	154.0 (6.06)	167.1 (6.58)	1,902.4 (74.90)
Average precipitation days (≥ 1.0 mm)	16.5	16.1	17.2	15.9	16.2	15.9	17.0	12.9	11.8	13.1	14.2	16.7	183.4
Average snowy days	20.3	19.0	21.6	19.9	16.1	8.3	5.7	4.6	9.4	13.8	17.5	19.6	175.8
Average relative humidity (%)	70.7	73.6	74.8	80.9	85.0	84.9	84.4	81.3	78.2	73.1	74.5	72.0	77.8
Mean monthly sunshine hours	124.0	129.1	164.8	172.6	168.9	159.3	168.7	179.6	166.4	165.8	121.1	111.2	1,831.5
Source: NOAA

== Gallery ==
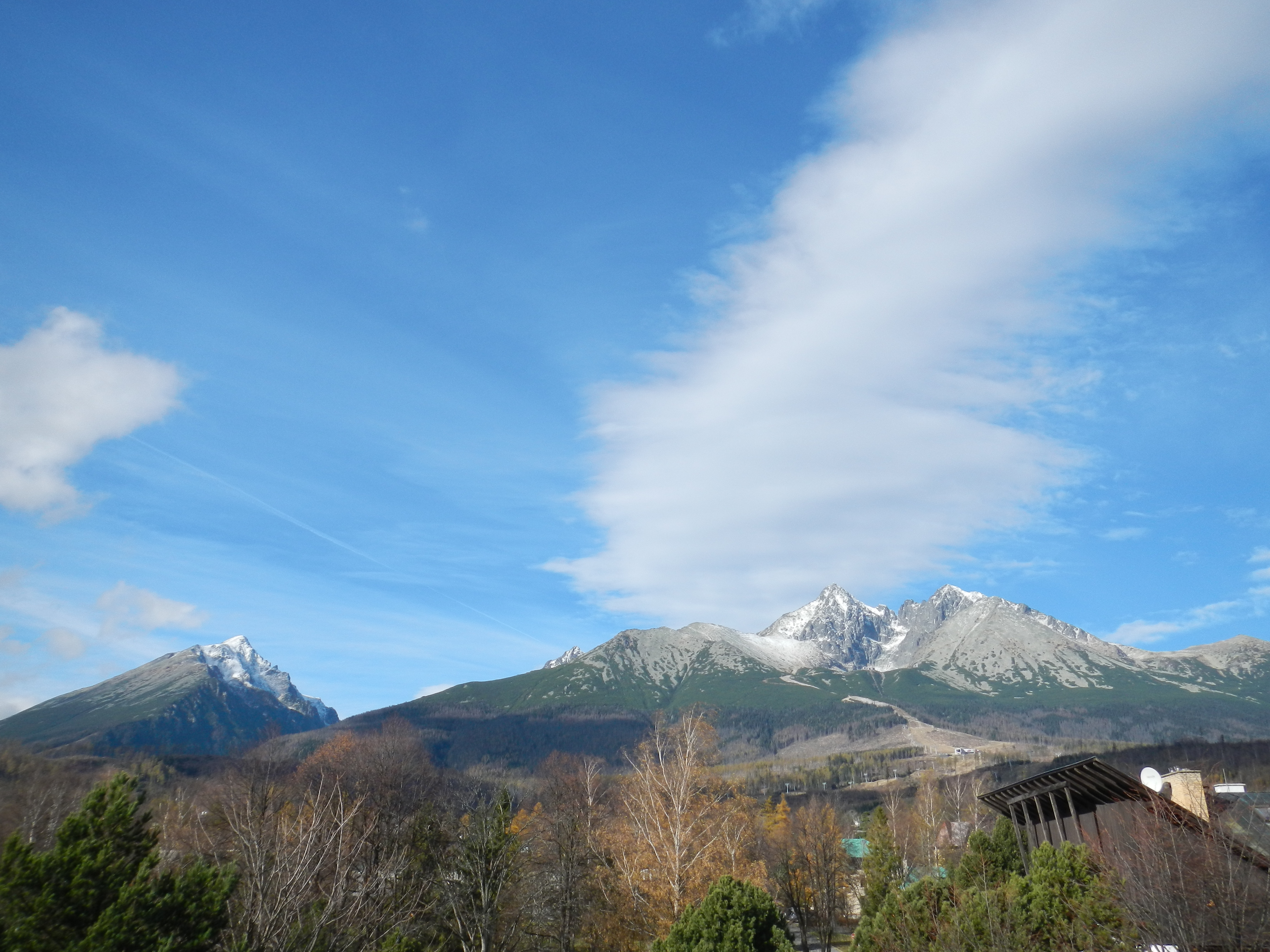
Slavkovský štít (left) and Lomnický štít (center right) as seen from Tatranská Lomnica, Slovakia

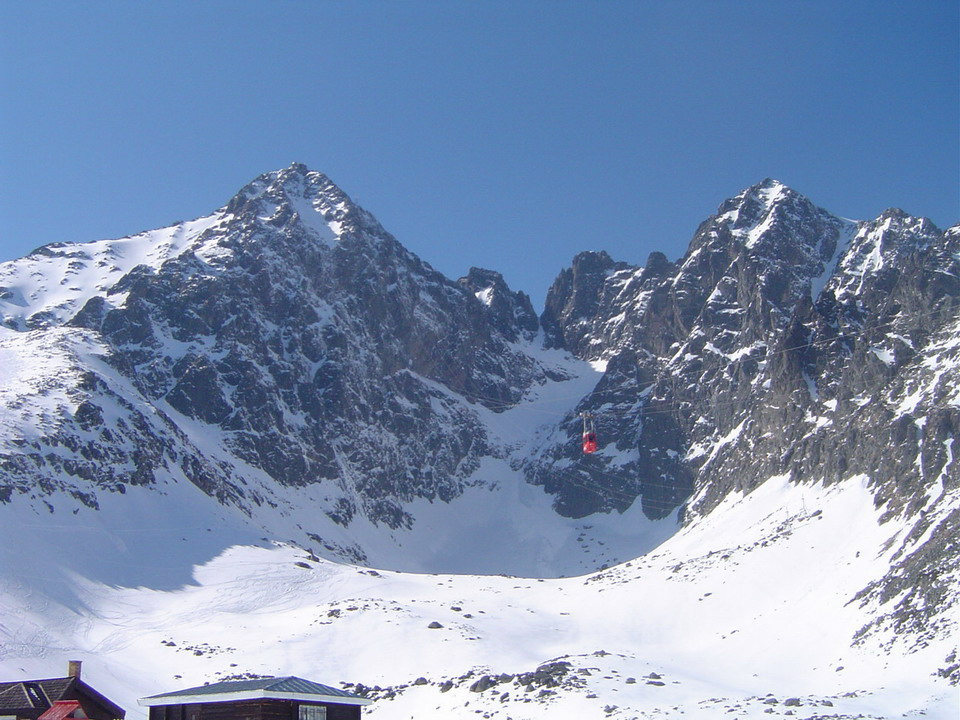
From left: Lomnický štít, Vidlové veže, Kežmarský štít, and Malý Kežmarský štít, as viewed from Skalnaté pleso

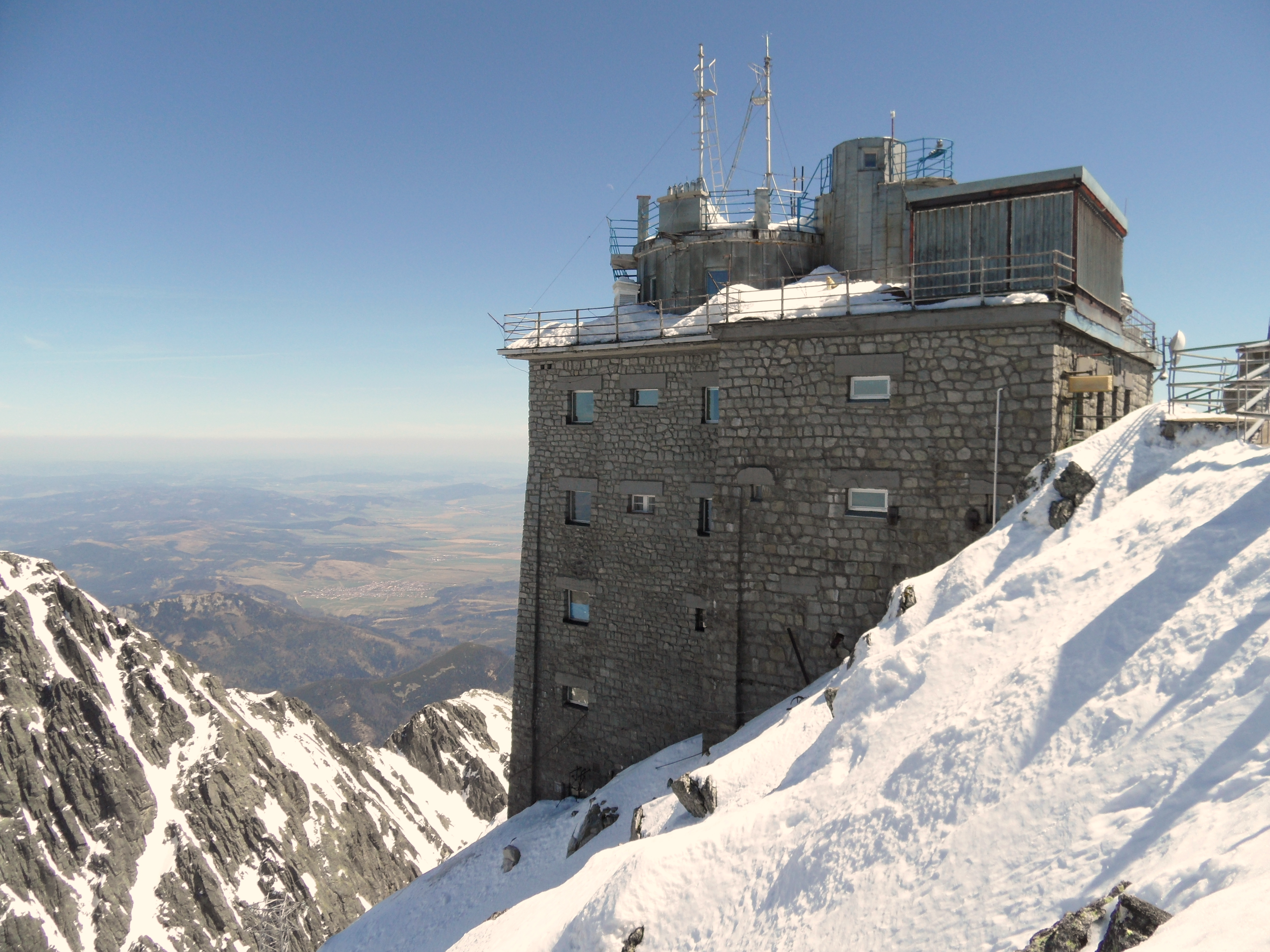
Solar observatory Lomnický štít (Slovakia) built in 1962

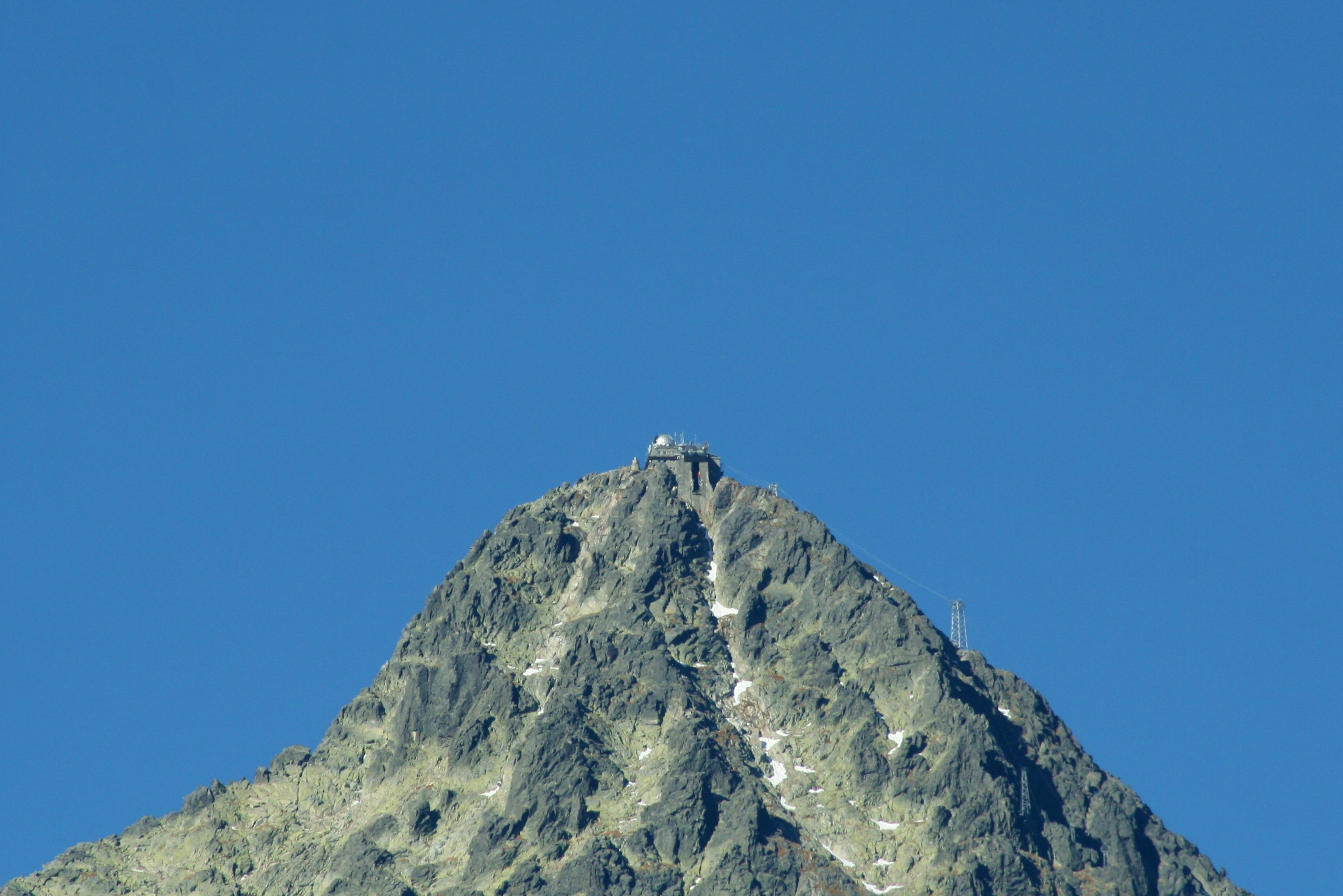
The observatory as seen from Tatranská Lomnica

== Sources ==
- http://www.vysoketatry.com/ciele/lstit/en.html
