= Gerlachovský štít =

Highest mountain in Slovakia

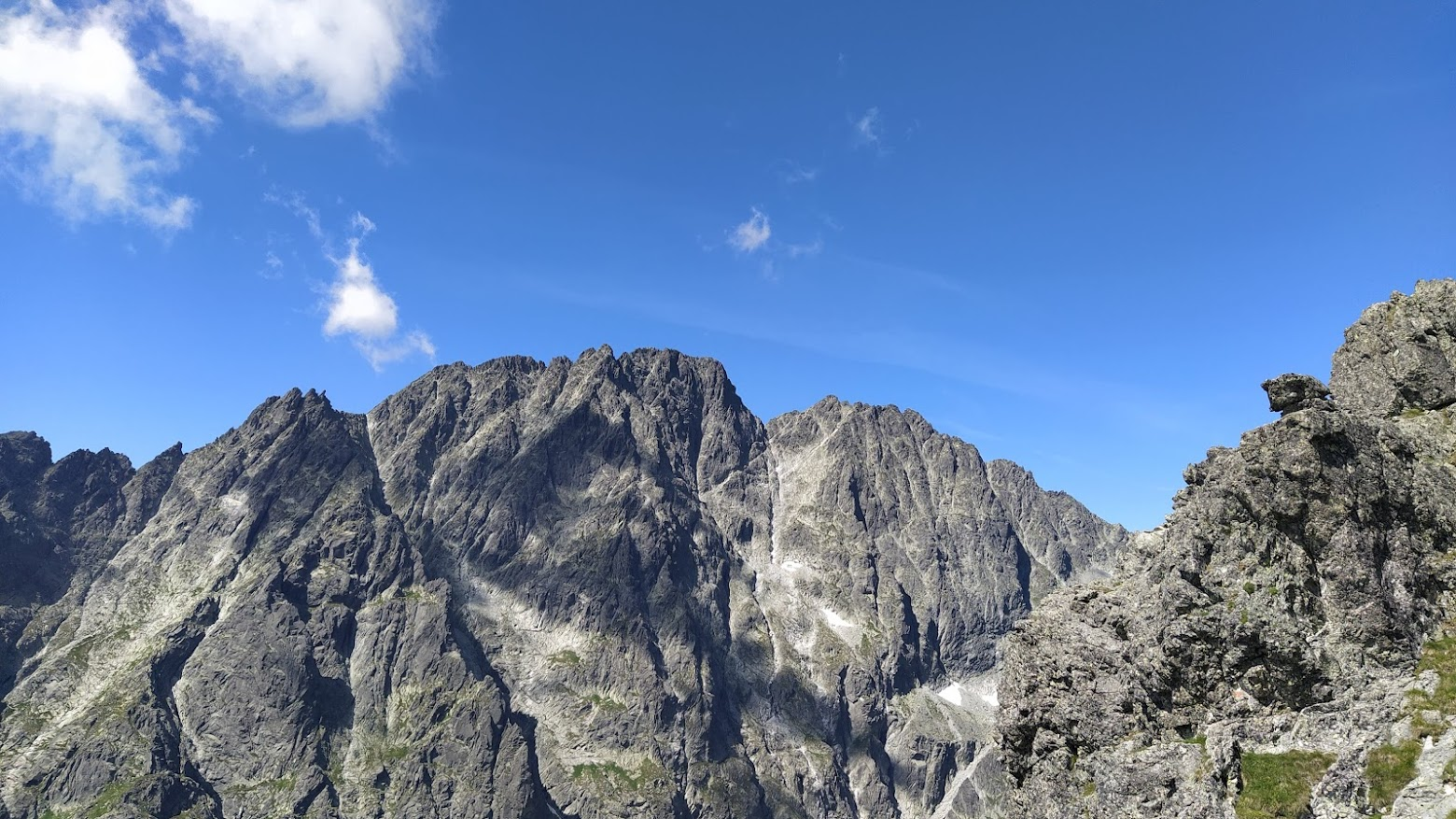
- Gerlachovský štít as seen from Granátová lávka

Highest point
- Elevation: 2,654.4 m (8,709 ft)
- Prominence: 2,349 m (7,707 ft)
- Parent peak: Valluga (line parent)
- Isolation: 510.06 km (316.94 mi) to Hochwildstelle
- Listing: Ultra; Country high point
- Coordinates: 49°09′50.5″N 20°08′02.5″E

Naming
- English translation: Peak (of the village) of Gerlachov
- Language of name: Slovak

Geography
- Location within Prešov Region Location within Slovakia
- Location: Tatra National Park, Prešov, Slovakia
- Parent range: High Tatras

Geology
- Mountain type: granite

Climbing
- First ascent: 1834 by Ján Still
- Easiest route: Scramble

Gerlachovský štít 3D

Gerlachovský štít (Slovak pronunciation, translated into English as Gerlachov Peak, German: Gerlsdorfer Spitze, Hungarian: Gerlachfalvi-csúcs), informally referred to as Gerlach, is the highest peak in the High Tatras, in Slovakia, and in the Carpathian Mountains. Its elevation is usually listed at 2654.4 m above sea level. The mountain features a vertical rise of approximately 2,000 metres (6,600 ft) above the valley floor.

Mistaken for an average mountain in the rugged High Tatras range in the more distant past, it has since played a symbolic role in the eyes of the rulers and populations of several Central European nations, to the point that between the 19th and mid-20th century, it had four different names with six name reversals. Due to geopolitical changes, it was successively the highest mountain of the Kingdom of Hungary, and of Czechoslovakia, Slovakia and then Czechoslovakia again within the span of less than three decades of the 20th century.

Gerlachovský štít shares its geology and ecology with the rest of the High Tatras. With the travel restrictions imposed by the Eastern Bloc, the mountain was particularly treasured by Czechs, East Germans, Hungarians, Poles, and Slovaks as a high mountain available for them to climb. Although local authorities have since restricted access to the peak, it continues to attract its share of visitors.

== Names ==
=== Present ===
Gerlachovský štít means the "Peak (of the village) of Gerlachov". The Slovak colloquial (unofficial) name is Gerlach. The Polish official names are Gerlach or Gierlach, while its Polish colloquial names are Girlach and Garłuch. The origin of the name of the village of Gerlachov itself is uncertain. It could be named after a lord of the area, or after the gravel in a nearby river.

Gerlachovská Veža ("Gerlachov Tower", 2642m) is regarded as part of the Gerlachovský Peak.

=== Past ===
The peak's earliest recorded name was the Szepes-German Kösselberg (Cauldron Mountain) on a map from 1762. The Slovak name of the mountain was first recorded as Kotol, also meaning "Cauldron", in 1821.

Its current name became widely used in the 19th century, and links the mountain to the village of Gerlachov (Carpathian German: Gerlsdorf)) at its foot. The name Gerlsdorfer Spitze (Gerlachov Peak) was used by the first person to identify the mountain as the highest peak in the Tatras in 1838; this was rendered as gerlachovský chochol (Gerlach crest) in a Slovak version of his report in 1851.

Once it was determined that the mountain was the highest point in the region, the succession of the authorities that held control over it took an interest in its name and changed it periodically for symbolic reasons. In 1896, as part of Austria-Hungary, it was named after state Emperor Francis Joseph I. After the dissolution of the monarchy in 1918, the mountain continued to be known simply as Gerlachovský štít because it belonged to the village of Gerlachov. The Polish government, claiming the territory of the High Tatras for Poland, simultaneously called the mountain Szczyt Polski (Polish Peak), but never gained control over it. The new Czechoslovak government changed the name to Štít legionárov (Legionnaires Peak) in honor of the Czechoslovak Legions in 1923, but the name was dropped in favour of the earlier Gerlachovský štít in 1932. As a result of the Communist coup d'état in 1948, the mountain was renamed once more, to Stalinov štít (Stalin Peak) in 1949. Its traditional name Gerlachovský štít was restored yet again in 1959.

== History ==
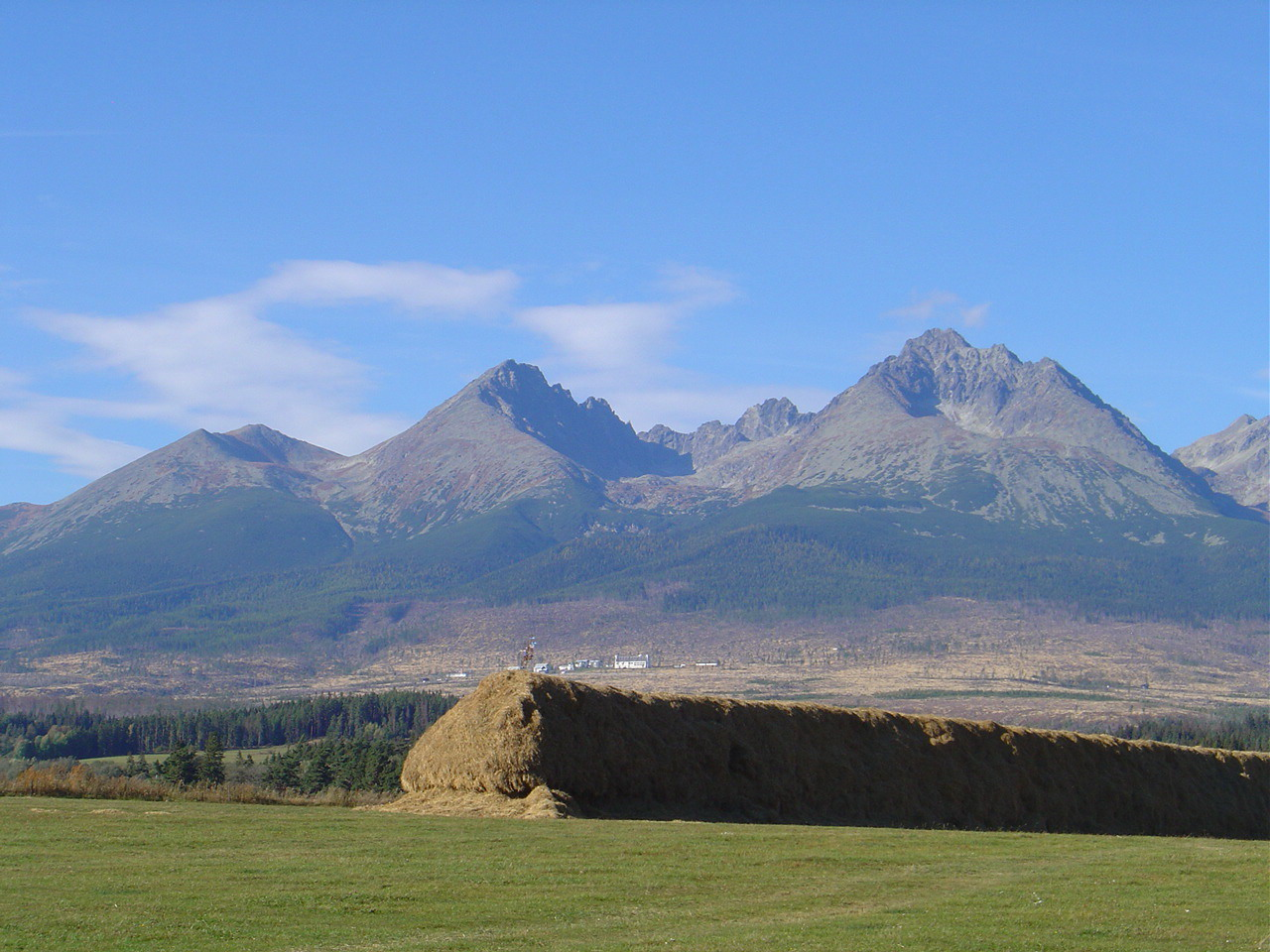
Gerlachovský štít (right) with its huge cirque

Gerlachovský štít was not always considered the highest mountain in the Tatras. After the first official measurement of peaks in the Tatras during the period of the Habsburg monarchy in the 18th century, Kriváň (2,494 m) was considered the highest. Other candidate peaks for the status of the highest mountain at that time were Lomnický štít (2,633 m) and Ľadový štít (2,627 m). The first person to accurately name Gerlachovský štít as the highest peak was the forester Ľudovít (Ludwig) Greiner in 1838. Greiner's measurement was formally confirmed by an Austrian Army survey party in 1868. However, it was generally accepted only after the Vienna Military Institute for Geography issued a new, authoritative collection of maps of Central Europe in c. 1875.

The first confirmed ascent was made by Ján (Johann) Still from the village of Nová Lesná in 1834.

The secondary summit, Zadný (Back) Gerlachovský Štít (2606m), is the site of a 1944 military air crash, in which all the crew were killed. The remains of the aircraft can be viewed. The crew are buried at Gerlachov and there is a memorial in the Symbolický Cintorín (Symbolic Cemetery) at Popradské Pleso.

== Access ==
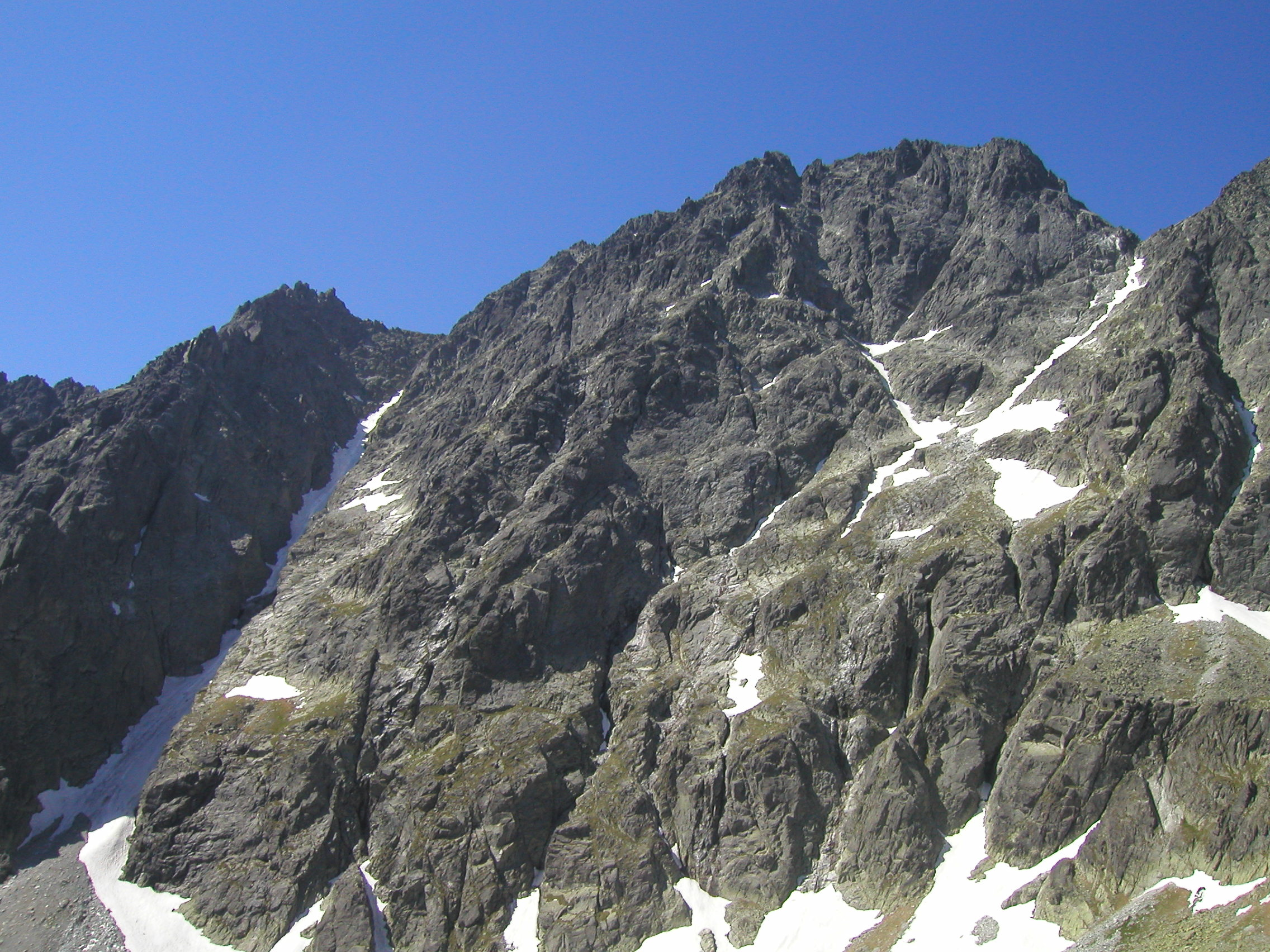
Gerlachovský štít seen from Velická Valley

Only members of a national Union Internationale des Associations d'Alpinisme (UIAA) club are allowed to climb the peak on their own. Other visitors have to take a certified mountain guide. The two easiest routes, usually up the Velická próba and down the Batizovská próba named after their respective valleys, have been protected by chains since 1880. Because of an exposed section along the Velická próba and tricky orientation especially on the ridge, both are among the more difficult scrambling routes in the High Tatras. With no snow, guidebooks grade the routes as a II or III climb (UIAA scale) or lower.

The total elevation gain is about 1,000 m (3,300 ft) for those who spend the night at the Sliezsky Dom Hotel or are driven there by a mountain guide, and about 1,665 m (5,463 ft) for those who hike from Tatranská Polianka. In winter, Gerlachovský štít offers a challenging alpine climb, with mixed climbing and a risk of avalanches.

Two multi-pitch routes for technical climbing are on the eastern and south-western walls. Both are exceptionally long and situated on solid granite walls.

The route to Gerlachovský štít falls under the Tatra National Park ordinance, according to which hikers who depart from marked trails may be subject to fines unless they are UIAA members, or are led by a certified mountain guide.

== Conditions at the summit ==
=== Weather ===
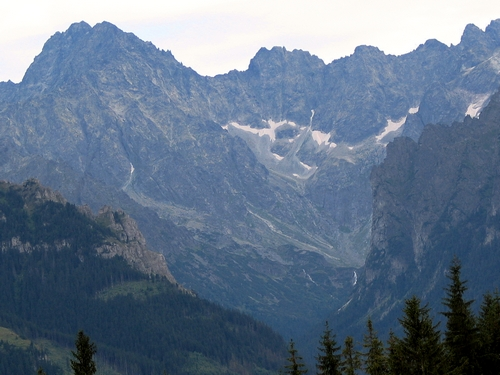
Gerlachovský štít (left) viewed from Rusinowa Polana

The effects of high-altitude weather on those who ascend Gerlachovský štít may be more pronounced than its altitude alone. The temperature gradient between the Tatra mountain resorts (900–1,350 m or 2,950–4,430 ft) and the summit can be steep. Low air temperature higher up can be masked by high insolation under clear skies, but will take its effect with increased cloud cover. Combined with windy conditions, the impact may be considerably detrimental even without rain or snow. The summit disappears in the clouds for periods of time on most days, which translates to fog at that elevation and a risk of disorientation.

While temperatures are somewhat lower on Gerlachovský štít because of its elevation, the weather and its potential impact on visitors is little different from other summits in the High Tatras both with and without marked trails. The typical daily weather pattern in the summer is a clear morning, clouds gathering by around noon, and occasional showers and storms in the afternoon. The chance of rain is lowest between 9–10 am and peaks between 2–3 pm, with a drop-off after 6 pm. The frequency of storms with lightning (as opposed to rainstorms) on Gerlach's summit and on the other highest ridges is little different from lower elevations.

=== Climate ===
Climate data for Lomnický štít, 49°11′43″N 20°12′47″E, 2,635 m (8,645 ft) amsl, (1991−2020 normals, extremes 1952–present)
Month	Jan	Feb	Mar	Apr	May	Jun	Jul	Aug	Sep	Oct	Nov	Dec	Year
Record high °C (°F)	5.0 (41.0)	6.2 (43.2)	7.5 (45.5)	10.0 (50.0)	16.0 (60.8)	21.0 (69.8)	19.5 (67.1)	24.0 (75.2)	14.5 (58.1)	13.0 (55.4)	11.1 (52.0)	10.0 (50.0)	24.0 (75.2)
Mean daily maximum °C (°F)	−7.3 (18.9)	−7.7 (18.1)	−5.8 (21.6)	−1.7 (28.9)	2.9 (37.2)	6.9 (44.4)	8.7 (47.7)	9.0 (48.2)	4.5 (40.1)	1.1 (34.0)	−2.7 (27.1)	−6.2 (20.8)	0.1 (32.2)
Daily mean °C (°F)	−10.1 (13.8)	−10.6 (12.9)	−8.9 (16.0)	−4.7 (23.5)	−0.2 (31.6)	3.5 (38.3)	5.2 (41.4)	5.6 (42.1)	1.6 (34.9)	−1.6 (29.1)	−5.3 (22.5)	−8.8 (16.2)	−2.9 (26.8)
Mean daily minimum °C (°F)	−12.9 (8.8)	−13.4 (7.9)	−11.8 (10.8)	−7.5 (18.5)	−2.9 (26.8)	0.6 (33.1)	2.4 (36.3)	2.9 (37.2)	−0.9 (30.4)	−4.1 (24.6)	−7.8 (18.0)	−11.5 (11.3)	−5.6 (21.9)
Record low °C (°F)	−30.8 (−23.4)	−30.0 (−22.0)	−31.3 (−24.3)	−22.8 (−9.0)	−17.0 (1.4)	−12.0 (10.4)	−8.0 (17.6)	−11.0 (12.2)	−12.2 (10.0)	−19.9 (−3.8)	−28.9 (−20.0)	−30.0 (−22.0)	−31.3 (−24.3)
Average precipitation mm (inches)	176.9 (6.96)	170.3 (6.70)	182.1 (7.17)	165.3 (6.51)	149.1 (5.87)	156.5 (6.16)	193.7 (7.63)	140.8 (5.54)	120.3 (4.74)	126.3 (4.97)	154.0 (6.06)	167.1 (6.58)	1,902.4 (74.90)
Average precipitation days (≥ 1.0 mm)	16.5	16.1	17.2	15.9	16.2	15.9	17.0	12.9	11.8	13.1	14.2	16.7	183.4
Average snowy days	20.3	19.0	21.6	19.9	16.1	8.3	5.7	4.6	9.4	13.8	17.5	19.6	175.8
Average relative humidity (%)	70.7	73.6	74.8	80.9	85.0	84.9	84.4	81.3	78.2	73.1	74.5	72.0	77.8
Mean monthly sunshine hours	124.0	129.1	164.8	172.6	168.9	159.3	168.7	179.6	166.4	165.8	121.1	111.2	1,831.5
Source: NOAA

== See also ==
- Mountain Rescue Service (Slovakia)
