= Sihlianska Plateau =

Plateau in Slovakia

Coordinates: 48°38′54″N 19°40′21″E

The Sihlianska Plateau is a plateau in the Vepor Mountains of Slovakia with a height of 1,162m. It is named after the municipality of Sihla.

== Villages ==
- Sihla
- Lom nad Rimavicou
- Drábsko
- Detvianska Huta
