= Koceľovce =

Village and municipality in Slovakia

Koceľovce Gecelfalva
- Municipality
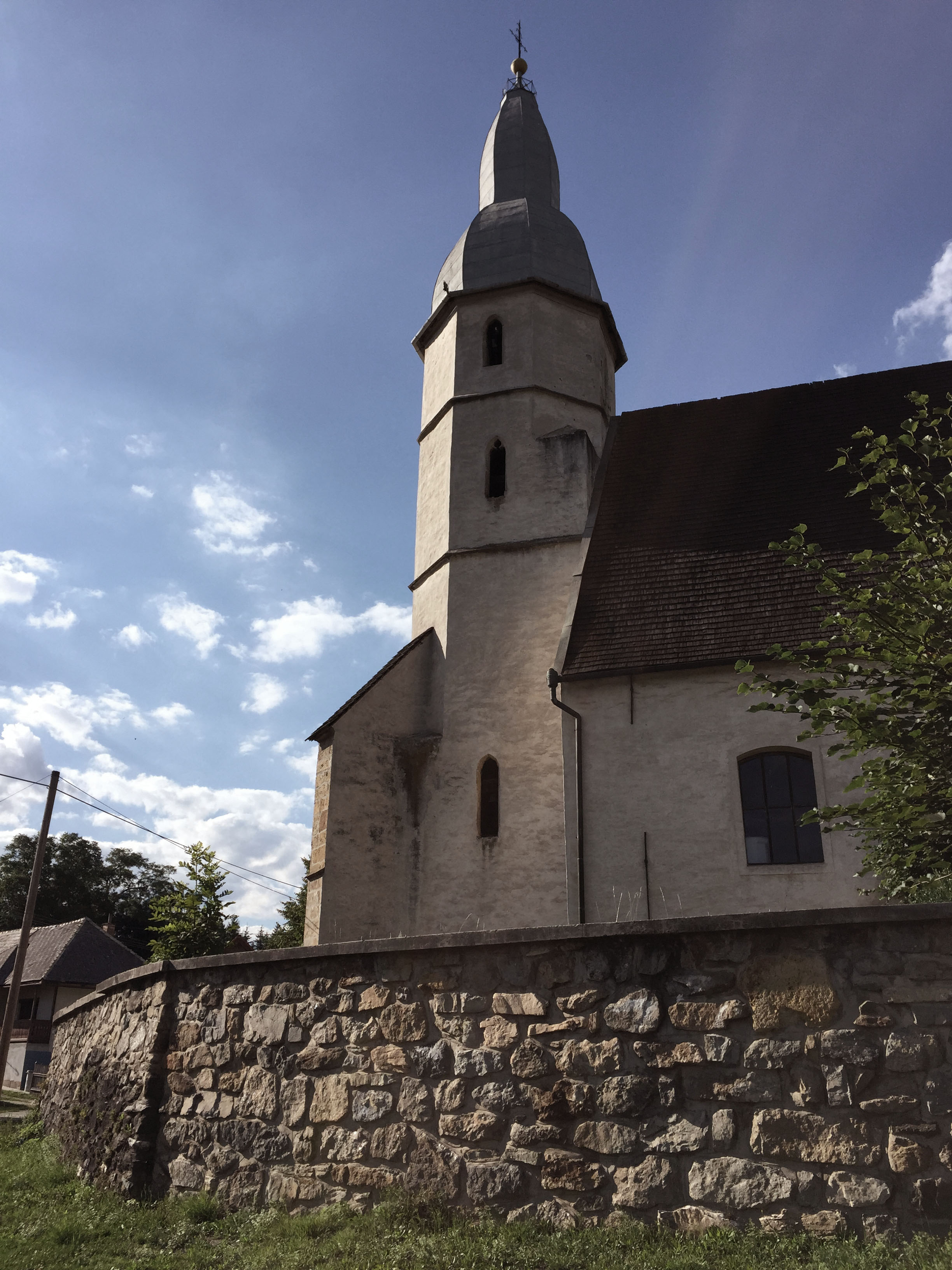

- Flag

- Location of Koceľovce in the Košice Region Location of Koceľovce in Slovakia
- Coordinates: 48.72°N 20.35°E
- Country: Slovakia
- Region: Košice Region
- District: Rožňava District
- First mentioned: 1318

Area
  - Total: 6.95 km^{2} (2.68 sq mi)
- Elevation: 345 m (1,132 ft)

Population (2025)
  - Total: 222
- Time zone: UTC+1 (CET)
  - Summer (DST): UTC+2 (CEST)
- Postal code: 493 5
- Area code: +421 58
- Vehicle registration plate (until 2022): RV
- Website: www.kocelovce.sk

Koceľovce (Slovak pronunciation: [ˈkɔtseʎɔwtse]; Hungarian: Gecelfalva) is a village and municipality in the Rožňava District in the Košice Region of middle-eastern Slovakia.

== History ==
In historical records the village was first mentioned in 1318. Before the establishment of independent Czechoslovakia in 1918, Koceľovce was part of Gömör and Kishont County within the Kingdom of Hungary. From 1939 to 1945, it was part of the Slovak Republic.

== Geography ==
The municipality lies at an altitude of 345 metres (1,132 ft) and covers an area of 6.95 km^{2} (2.68 sq mi) (2025).

== Population ==
Population statistic (10 years)
Year	1995	2005	2015	2025
Count	252	256	249	222
Difference		+1.58%	−2.73%	−10.84%

Population statistic
Year	2024	2025
Count	218	222
Difference		+1.83%

It has a population of 222 people (31 December 2025).

=== Ethnicity ===
Census 2021 (1+ %)
Ethnicity	Number	Fraction
Slovak	228	98.7%
Romani	37	16.01%
Not found out	3	1.29%
Total	231	

In year 2021 was 231 people by ethnicity 228 as Slovak, 37 as Romani, 3 as Not found out and 2 as English.

Note on population: The difference values of population numbers in the table "Population statistic" and in the sections "Ethnicity" & "Religion" is caused by the use of various statistical methods.

=== Religion ===
Census 2021 (1+ %)
Religion	Number	Fraction
Evangelical Church	128	55.41%
None	79	34.2%
Roman Catholic Church	15	6.49%
United Methodist Church	4	1.73%
Not found out	3	1.3%
Total	231	

In year 2021 was 231 people by religion 128 from Evangelical Church, 79 from None, 15 from Roman Catholic Church, 4 from United Methodist Church, 3 from Not found out and 2 from Greek Catholic Church.

== Culture ==
The village has a public library.

== Genealogical resources ==
The records for genealogical research are available at the state archive "Statny Archiv in Kosice, Slovakia"

- Lutheran church records (births/marriages/deaths): 1785-1942 (parish A)

== See also ==
- List of municipalities and towns in Slovakia
