= Dolná Lehota =

Dolná Lehota Alsószabadi
- Municipality
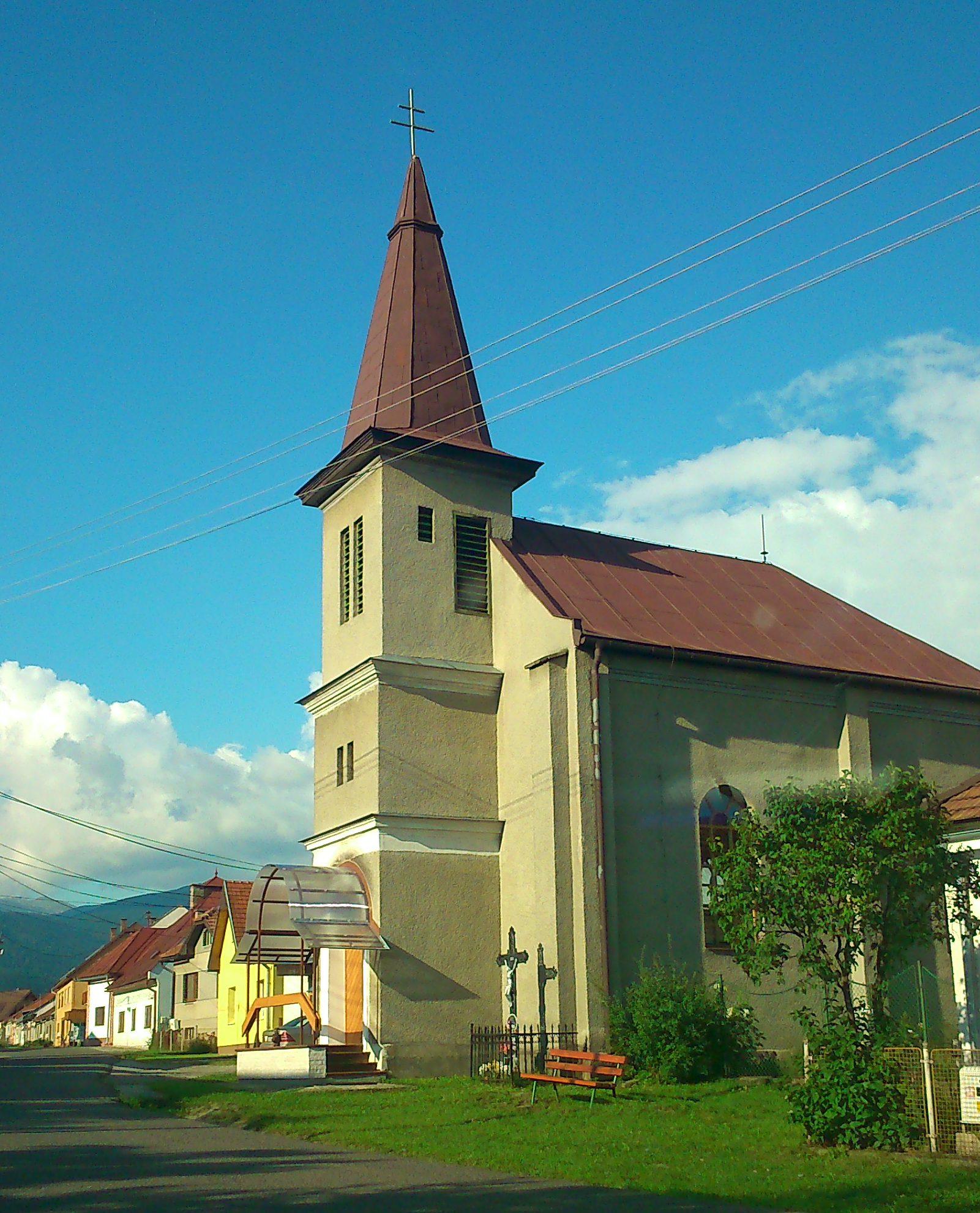

- Flag

- Location of Dolná Lehota in the Banská Bystrica Region Location of Dolná Lehota in Slovakia
- Coordinates: 48.83°N 19.50°E
- Country: Slovakia
- Region: Banská Bystrica Region
- District: Brezno District
- First mentioned: 1424

Area
  - Total: 55.45 km^{2} (21.41 sq mi)
- Elevation: 496 m (1,627 ft)

Population (2025)
  - Total: 685
- Time zone: UTC+1 (CET)
  - Summer (DST): UTC+2 (CEST)
- Postal code: 976 98
- Area code: +421 48
- Vehicle registration plate (until 2022): BR
- Website: www.dolnalehota.wbl.sk?flash=ne

Dolná Lehota (earlier Dolná Lehôtka; Hungarian: Alsószabadi) is a village and municipality in Brezno District, in the Banská Bystrica Region of central Slovakia.

== Geography ==
The municipality lies at an altitude of 496 metres (1,627 ft) and covers an area of 55.45 km^{2} (21.41 sq mi) (2025).

== History ==
The village was founded in 1358 by a certain Peter from Predajná. In historical records, the village was first mentioned in 1424 (1424 Petwrlehota, 1455 Lehota Petri, 1464 Petrik Lahathaya, 1528 Inferior Lehota).

== Population ==
Population statistic (10 years)
Year	1995	2005	2015	2025
Count	713	718	751	685
Difference		+0.70%	+4.59%	−8.78%

Population statistic
Year	2024	2025
Count	688	685
Difference		−0.43%

It has a population of 685 people (31 December 2025).

=== Ethnicity ===
Census 2021 (1+ %)
Ethnicity	Number	Fraction
Slovak	661	97.06%
Not found out	19	2.79%
Total	681	

In year 2021 was 681 people by ethnicity 661 as Slovak, 19 as Not found out, 5 as Czech, 2 as Austrian, 2 as Other and 1 as Russian.

Note on population: The difference values of population numbers in the table "Population statistic" and in the sections "Ethnicity" & "Religion" is caused by the use of various statistical methods.

=== Religion ===
Census 2021 (1+ %)
Religion	Number	Fraction
Roman Catholic Church	469	68.87%
None	155	22.76%
Evangelical Church	33	4.85%
Not found out	17	2.5%
Total	681	

In year 2021 was 681 people by religion 469 from Roman Catholic Church, 155 from None, 33 from Evangelical Church, 17 from Not found out, 2 from Christian Congregations in Slovakia, 2 from Other, 2 from Greek Catholic Church and 1 from Paganism and natural spirituality.

== Genealogical resources ==
The records for genealogical research are available at the state archive "Statny Archiv in Banska Bystrica, Slovakia"

- Roman Catholic church records (births/marriages/deaths): 1754-1938 (parish B)
- Lutheran church records (births/marriages/deaths): 1784-1927 (parish B

== See also ==
- List of municipalities and towns in Slovakia
