= Braväcovo =

Braväcovo Baracka
- Municipality
- Flag

- Location of Braväcovo in the Banská Bystrica Region Location of Braväcovo in Slovakia
- Coordinates: 48.83°N 19.73°E
- Country: Slovakia
- Region: Banská Bystrica Region
- District: Brezno District
- First mentioned: 1630

Government
  - Mayor: Peter Baliak

Area
  - Total: 29.40 km^{2} (11.35 sq mi)
- Elevation: 610 m (2,000 ft)

Population (2025)
  - Total: 621
- Time zone: UTC+1 (CET)
  - Summer (DST): UTC+2 (CEST)
- Postal code: 976 64
- Area code: +421 48
- Vehicle registration plate (until 2022): BR
- Website: www.bravacovo.sk

Braväcovo (until World War II Bravacovo; Hungarian: Baracka) is a village and municipality in Brezno District, in the Banská Bystrica Region of central Slovakia.

== Geography ==
The municipality lies at an altitude of 610 metres (2,000 ft) and covers an area of 29.40 km^{2} (11.35 sq mi) (2025).

== History ==
The village arose in the 16th century as a settlement within Beňuš. It was founded by German miners and Polish coalmakers. In 1808 it was mentioned as a shepherds colony in the Horehronie Region.

== Population ==
Population statistic (10 years)
Year	1995	2005	2015	2025
Count	737	718	691	621
Difference		−2.57%	−3.76%	−10.13%

Population statistic
Year	2024	2025
Count	647	621
Difference		−4.01%

It has a population of 621 people (31 December 2025).

=== Ethnicity ===
Census 2021 (1+ %)
Ethnicity	Number	Fraction
Slovak	659	96.91%
Not found out	17	2.5%
Total	680	

In year 2021 was 680 people by ethnicity 659 as Slovak, 17 as Not found out, 3 as Czech, 1 as Ukrainian, 1 as Romani, 1 as Moravian and 1 as Hungarian.

Note on population: The difference values of population numbers in the table "Population statistic" and in the sections "Ethnicity" & "Religion" is caused by the use of various statistical methods.

=== Religion ===
Census 2021 (1+ %)
Religion	Number	Fraction
Roman Catholic Church	503	73.97%
None	130	19.12%
Not found out	15	2.21%
Christian Congregations in Slovakia	12	1.76%
Evangelical Church	8	1.18%
Total	680	

In year 2021 was 680 people by religion 503 from Roman Catholic Church, 130 from None, 15 from Not found out, 12 from Christian Congregations in Slovakia, 8 from Evangelical Church, 5 from Greek Catholic Church, 3 from Other, 2 from Paganism and natural spirituality, 1 from Calvinist Church and 1 from Seventh-day Adventist Church.

== Genealogical resources ==
The records for genealogical research are available at the state archive "Statny Archiv in Banska Bystrica, Slovakia"

- Roman Catholic church records (births/marriages/deaths): 1786-1896 (parish B)

== See also ==
- List of municipalities and towns in Slovakia
