= Heľpa =

Village and municipality in Slovakia

Heľpa Helpa
- Municipality
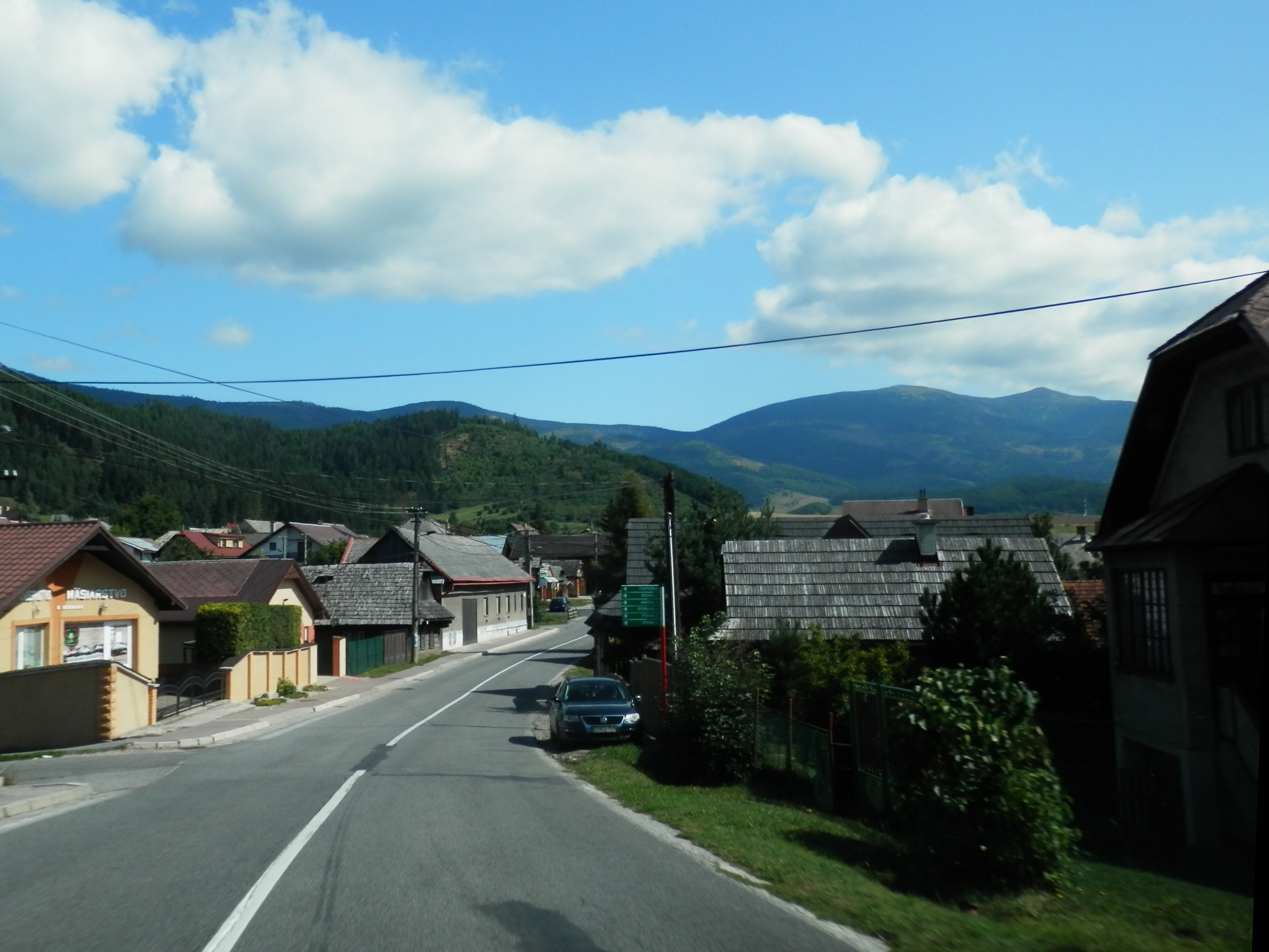

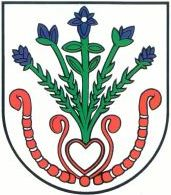
- Flag Coat of arms

- Location of Heľpa in the Banská Bystrica Region Location of Heľpa in Slovakia
- Coordinates: 48.87°N 19.97°E
- Country: Slovakia
- Region: Banská Bystrica Region
- District: Brezno District
- First mentioned: 1551

Area
  - Total: 41.70 km^{2} (16.10 sq mi)
- Elevation: 660 m (2,170 ft)

Population (2025)
  - Total: 2,363
- Time zone: UTC+1 (CET)
  - Summer (DST): UTC+2 (CEST)
- Postal code: 976 68
- Area code: +421 48
- Vehicle registration plate (until 2022): BR
- Website: www.helpa.sk

Heľpa (German: Helpach an der Gran; Hungarian: Helpa) is a village and municipality in Brezno District, in the Banská Bystrica Region of central Slovakia.

== Geography ==
The municipality lies at an altitude of 660 metres (2,170 ft) and covers an area of 41.70 km^{2} (16.10 sq mi) (2025).

== History ==
In historical records, the village was first mentioned in 1549. In 1551 it Walachian settlers established here and Walachian Law was applied. Before the establishment of independent Czechoslovakia in 1918, Heľpa was part of Gömör and Kishont County within the Kingdom of Hungary. From 1939 to 1945, it was part of the Slovak Republic. On 31 January 1945, the Red Army and the Romanian Army entered Heľpa and it was once again part of Czechoslovakia.

== Genealogical resources ==
The records for genealogical research are available at the state archive "Statny Archiv in Banska Bystrica, Slovakia"

- Roman Catholic church records (births/marriages/deaths): 1736-1909 (parish A)
- Greek Catholic church records (births/marriages/deaths): 1775-1928 (parish B)
- Lutheran church records (births/marriages/deaths): 1828-1937 (parish B)

== Population ==
Population statistic (10 years)
Year	1995	2005	2015	2025
Count	3059	2932	2657	2363
Difference		−4.15%	−9.37%	−11.06%

Population statistic
Year	2024	2025
Count	2393	2363
Difference		−1.25%

It has a population of 2363 people (31 December 2025).

=== Ethnicity ===
Census 2021 (1+ %)
Ethnicity	Number	Fraction
Slovak	2356	95.34%
Not found out	104	4.2%
Romani	27	1.09%
Total	2471	

In year 2021 was 2471 people by ethnicity 2356 as Slovak, 104 as Not found out, 27 as Romani, 8 as Czech, 7 as Ukrainian, 4 as Hungarian, 4 as Other, 2 as Italian, 2 as Rusyn, 2 as German, 1 as Irish, 1 as Polish, 1 as French and 1 as English.

Note on population: The difference values of population numbers in the table "Population statistic" and in the sections "Ethnicity" & "Religion" is caused by the use of various statistical methods.

=== Religion ===
Census 2021 (1+ %)
Religion	Number	Fraction
Roman Catholic Church	2187	88.51%
None	113	4.57%
Not found out	101	4.09%
Total	2471	

In year 2021 was 2471 people by religion 2187 from Roman Catholic Church, 113 from None, 101 from Not found out, 18 from Greek Catholic Church, 16 from Evangelical Church, 11 from Christian Congregations in Slovakia, 10 from Other, 3 from Paganism and natural spirituality, 3 from Baptists Church, 2 from Czechoslovak Hussite Church, 2 from Ad hoc movements, 1 from Calvinist Church, 1 from Eastern Orthodox Church, 1 from Other and not ascertained christian church, 1 from Jehovah's Witnesses and 1 from Buddhism.

== See also ==
- List of municipalities and towns in Slovakia
