= Bacúch =

Village and municipality in Slovakia

Bacúch Vacok
- Municipality
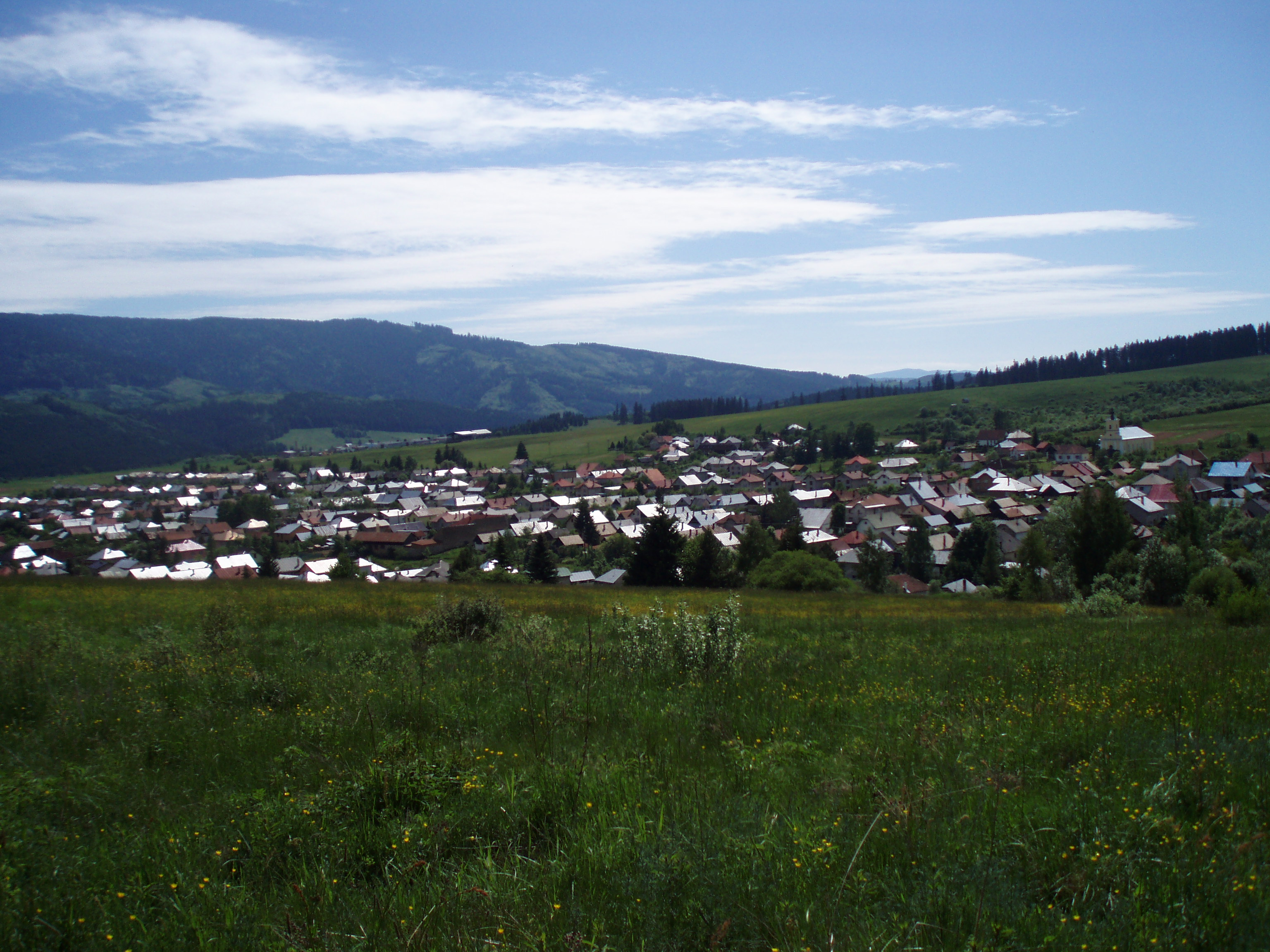

- Flag

- Location of Bacúch in the Banská Bystrica Region Location of Bacúch in Slovakia
- Coordinates: 48.87°N 19.82°E
- Country: Slovakia
- Region: Banská Bystrica Region
- District: Brezno District
- First mentioned: 1563

Area
  - Total: 38.18 km^{2} (14.74 sq mi)
- Elevation: 605 m (1,985 ft)

Population (2025)
  - Total: 876
- Time zone: UTC+1 (CET)
  - Summer (DST): UTC+2 (CEST)
- Postal code: 976 65
- Area code: +421 48
- Vehicle registration plate (until 2022): BR
- Website: bacuch.sk

Bacúch (German: Batzuch or Watzuch; Hungarian: Vacok) is a village and municipality in the Brezno District, in the Banská Bystrica Region of Slovakia.

== Geography ==
The municipality lies at an altitude of 605 metres (1,985 ft) and covers an area of 38.18 km^{2} (14.74 sq mi) (2025).

== History ==
In historical records the village was first mentioned in 1563 as a part of the mining district of Brezno. It belonged to the Schaffer and Gaismair families from Banská Bystrica. The nickname of Bacúch is Zázrakovo 'place of wonder'.

== Genealogical resources ==
The records for genealogical research are available at the state archive in Banská Bystrica (Slovak: Štátny archív v Banskej Bystrici).

- Roman Catholic church records (births/marriages/deaths): 1786-1896 (parish: B), 1656–1688, 1695-1785 (parish: C)
- Census records 1869 of Bacuch are not available at the state archive.

== Population ==
Population statistic (10 years)
Year	1995	2005	2015	2025
Count	1107	1031	966	876
Difference		−6.86%	−6.30%	−9.31%

Population statistic
Year	2024	2025
Count	894	876
Difference		−2.01%

It has a population of 876 people (31 December 2025).

=== Ethnicity ===
Census 2021 (1+ %)
Ethnicity	Number	Fraction
Slovak	876	97.65%
Czech	11	1.22%
Not found out	11	1.22%
Total	897	

In year 2021 was 897 people by ethnicity 876 as Slovak, 11 as Czech, 11 as Not found out, 4 as Other, 3 as Russian, 2 as Moravian, 2 as Hungarian, 1 as Jewish, 1 as Vietnamese, 1 as Ukrainian, 1 as Rusyn, 1 as Romanian and 1 as German.

Note on population: The difference values of population numbers in the table "Population statistic" and in the sections "Ethnicity" & "Religion" is caused by the use of various statistical methods.

=== Religion ===
Census 2021 (1+ %)
Religion	Number	Fraction
Roman Catholic Church	673	75.03%
None	154	17.17%
Evangelical Church	22	2.45%
Not found out	15	1.67%
Greek Catholic Church	15	1.67%
Total	897	

In year 2021 was 897 people by religion 673 from Roman Catholic Church, 154 from None, 22 from Evangelical Church, 15 from Not found out, 15 from Greek Catholic Church, 3 from Christian Congregations in Slovakia, 2 from Eastern Orthodox Church, 2 from Other and not ascertained christian church, 2 from Other, 2 from United Methodist Church, 2 from Apostolic Church, 2 from Ad hoc movements, 1 from Old Catholic Church, 1 from Jehovah's Witnesses and 1 from Church of the Brethren.

== See also ==
- List of municipalities and towns in Slovakia
