= Ráztoka =

Ráztoka Rásztó
- Municipality
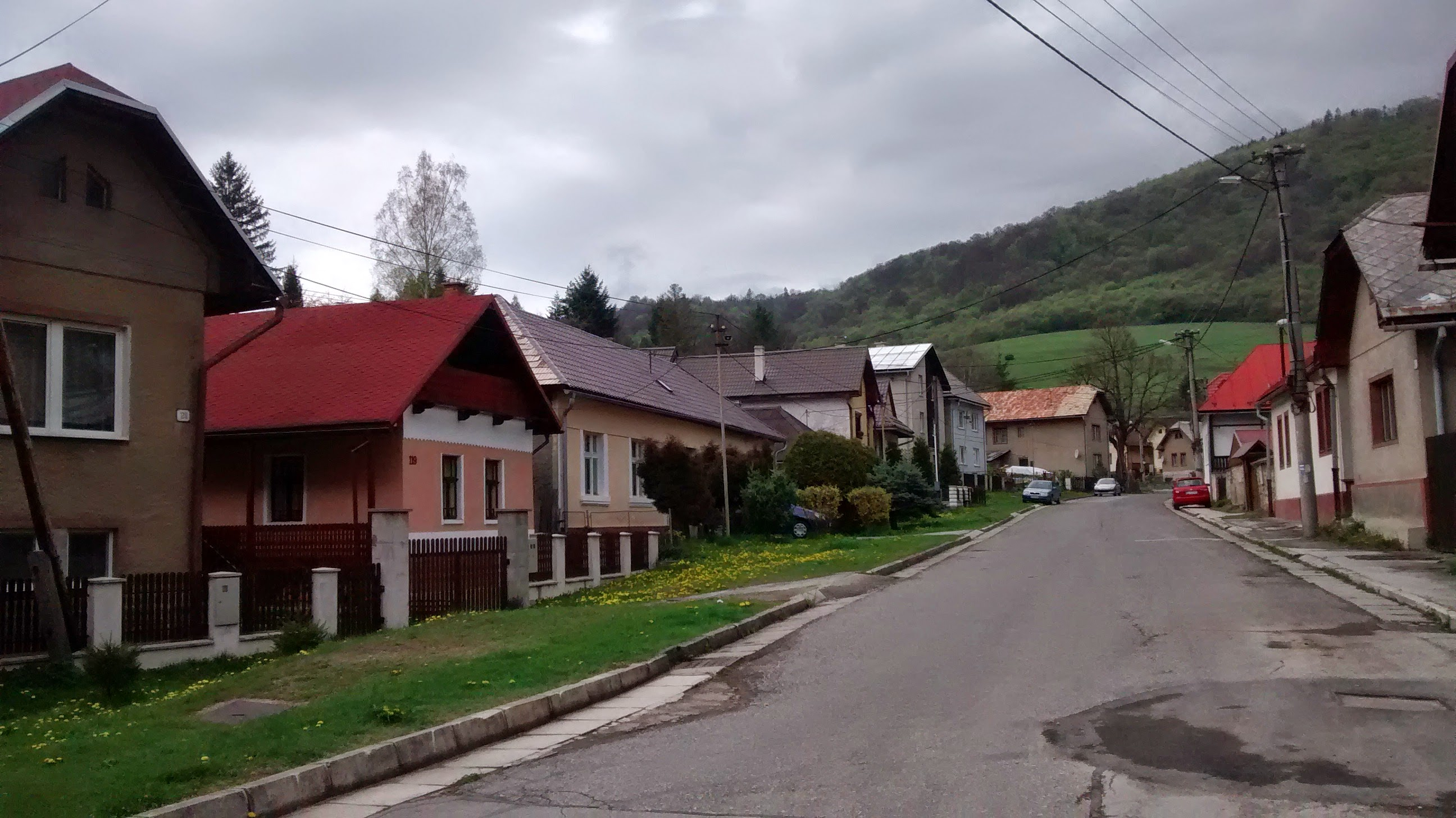

- Flag

- Location of Ráztoka in the Banská Bystrica Region Location of Ráztoka in Slovakia
- Coordinates: 48.82°N 19.40°E
- Country: Slovakia
- Region: Banská Bystrica Region
- District: Brezno District
- First mentioned: 1424

Area
  - Total: 8.07 km^{2} (3.12 sq mi)
- Elevation: 480 m (1,570 ft)

Population (2025)
  - Total: 271
- Time zone: UTC+1 (CET)
  - Summer (DST): UTC+2 (CEST)
- Postal code: 976 97
- Area code: +421 48
- Vehicle registration plate (until 2022): BR
- Website: www.raztoka.sk

Ráztoka (Hungarian: Rásztó) is a village and municipality in Brezno District, in the Banská Bystrica Region of central Slovakia. In the village is public library, football pitch, public swimming pool as well as cable TV network.

== Geography ==
The municipality lies at an altitude of 480 metres (1,570 ft) and covers an area of 8.07 km^{2} (3.12 sq mi) (2025).

== Population ==
Population statistic (10 years)
Year	1995	2005	2015	2025
Count	323	296	278	271
Difference		−8.35%	−6.08%	−2.51%

Population statistic
Year	2024	2025
Count	270	271
Difference		+0.37%

It has a population of 271 people (31 December 2025).

=== Ethnicity ===
Census 2021 (1+ %)
Ethnicity	Number	Fraction
Slovak	273	97.84%
Not found out	4	1.43%
Italian	3	1.07%
Total	279	

In year 2021 was 279 people by ethnicity 273 as Slovak, 4 as Not found out, 3 as Italian, 2 as Czech, 1 as Rusyn, 1 as German and 1 as Other.

Note on population: The difference values of population numbers in the table "Population statistic" and in the sections "Ethnicity" & "Religion" is caused by the use of various statistical methods.

=== Religion ===
Census 2021 (1+ %)
Religion	Number	Fraction
Roman Catholic Church	190	68.1%
None	71	25.45%
Christian Congregations in Slovakia	6	2.15%
Evangelical Church	5	1.79%
Other and not ascertained christian church	3	1.08%
Not found out	3	1.08%
Total	279	

In year 2021 was 279 people by religion 190 from Roman Catholic Church, 71 from None, 6 from Christian Congregations in Slovakia, 5 from Evangelical Church, 3 from Other and not ascertained christian church, 3 from Not found out and 1 from Greek Catholic Church.
