= Jasenie =

Jasenie Jecenye
- Municipality
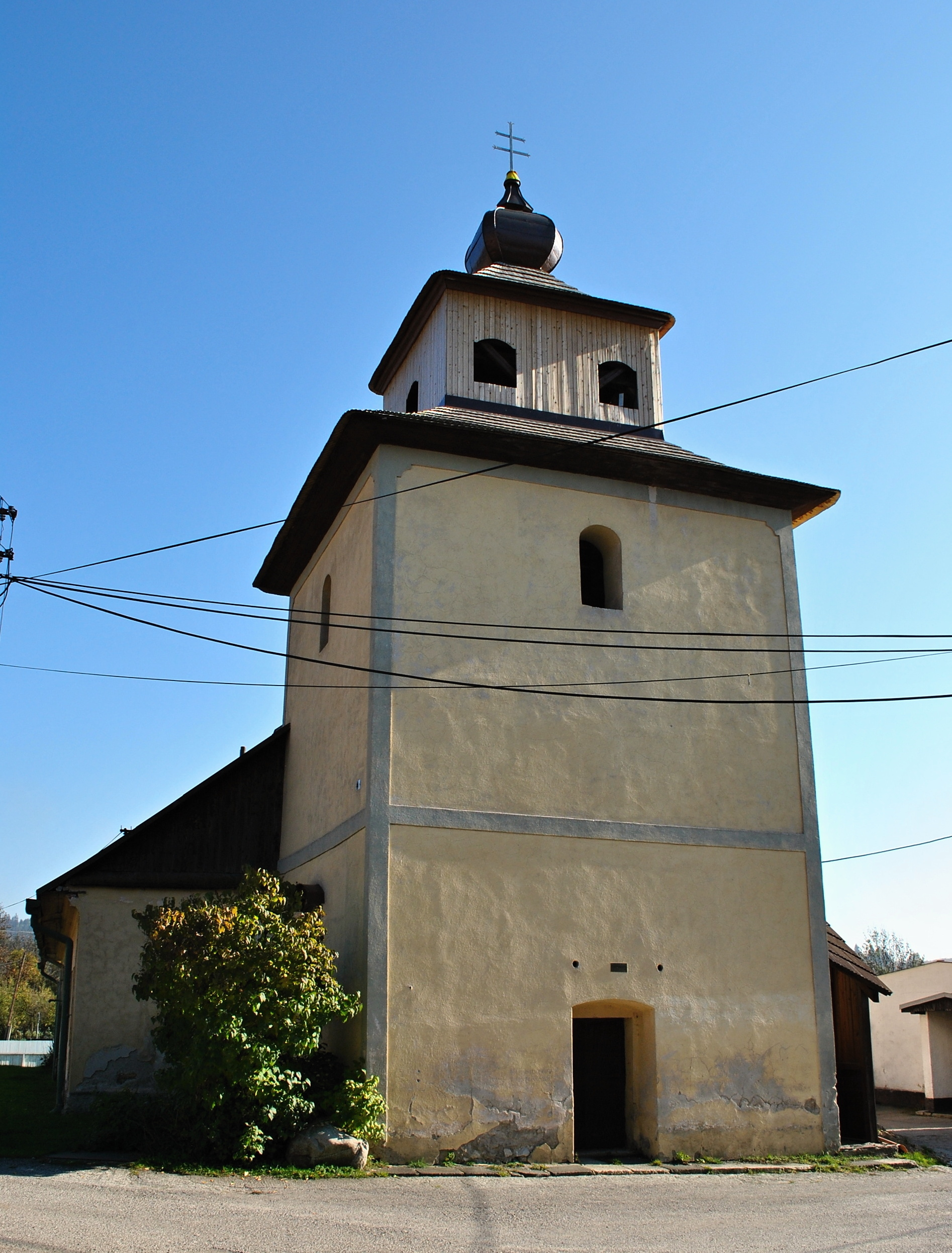

- Flag

- Location of Jasenie in the Banská Bystrica Region Location of Jasenie in Slovakia
- Coordinates: 48.84°N 19.46°E
- Country: Slovakia
- Region: Banská Bystrica Region
- District: Brezno District
- First mentioned: 1424

Area
  - Total: 86.16 km^{2} (33.27 sq mi)
- Elevation: 504 m (1,654 ft)

Population (2025)
  - Total: 1,166
- Time zone: UTC+1 (CET)
  - Summer (DST): UTC+2 (CEST)
- Postal code: 976 75
- Area code: +421 48
- Vehicle registration plate (until 2022): BR
- Website: www.jasenie.sk

Jasenie (Hungarian: Jecenye) is a village and municipality in Brezno District, in the Banská Bystrica Region of central Slovakia.

== Geography ==
The municipality lies at an altitude of 504 metres (1,654 ft) and covers an area of 86.16 km^{2} (33.27 sq mi) (2025).

== History ==
In historical records, the village was first mentioned in 1424 (1424 Jechene, 1455 Jezen, 1465 Jassena, 1512 Jesene), as belonging to Slovenská Ľupča town.

== Population ==
Population statistic (10 years)
Year	1995	2005	2015	2025
Count	1192	1099	1179	1166
Difference		−7.80%	+7.27%	−1.10%

Population statistic
Year	2024	2025
Count	1154	1166
Difference		+1.03%

It has a population of 1166 people (31 December 2025).

=== Ethnicity ===
Census 2021 (1+ %)
Ethnicity	Number	Fraction
Slovak	1119	98.33%
Not found out	14	1.23%
Total	1138	

In year 2021 was 1138 people by ethnicity 1119 as Slovak, 14 as Not found out, 8 as Czech, 4 as Other, 2 as Hungarian, 1 as Romani, 1 as Russian and 1 as German.

Note on population: The difference values of population numbers in the table "Population statistic" and in the sections "Ethnicity" & "Religion" is caused by the use of various statistical methods.

=== Religion ===
Census 2021 (1+ %)
Religion	Number	Fraction
Roman Catholic Church	803	70.56%
None	270	23.73%
Evangelical Church	26	2.28%
Not found out	15	1.32%
Total	1138	

In year 2021 was 1138 people by religion 803 from Roman Catholic Church, 270 from None, 26 from Evangelical Church, 15 from Not found out, 10 from Greek Catholic Church, 4 from Other, 3 from Christian Congregations in Slovakia, 2 from Calvinist Church, 2 from Eastern Orthodox Church, 1 from Old Catholic Church, 1 from Church of the Brethren and 1 from Buddhism.

== Genealogical resources ==
The records for genealogical research are available at the state archive "Statny Archiv in Banska Bystrica, Slovakia"

- Roman Catholic church records (births/marriages/deaths): 1673-1896 (parish B)
- Lutheran church records (births/marriages/deaths): 1784-1927 (parish B)

== See also ==
- List of municipalities and towns in Slovakia
