= Jarabá =

Jarabá Jarabó
- Municipality
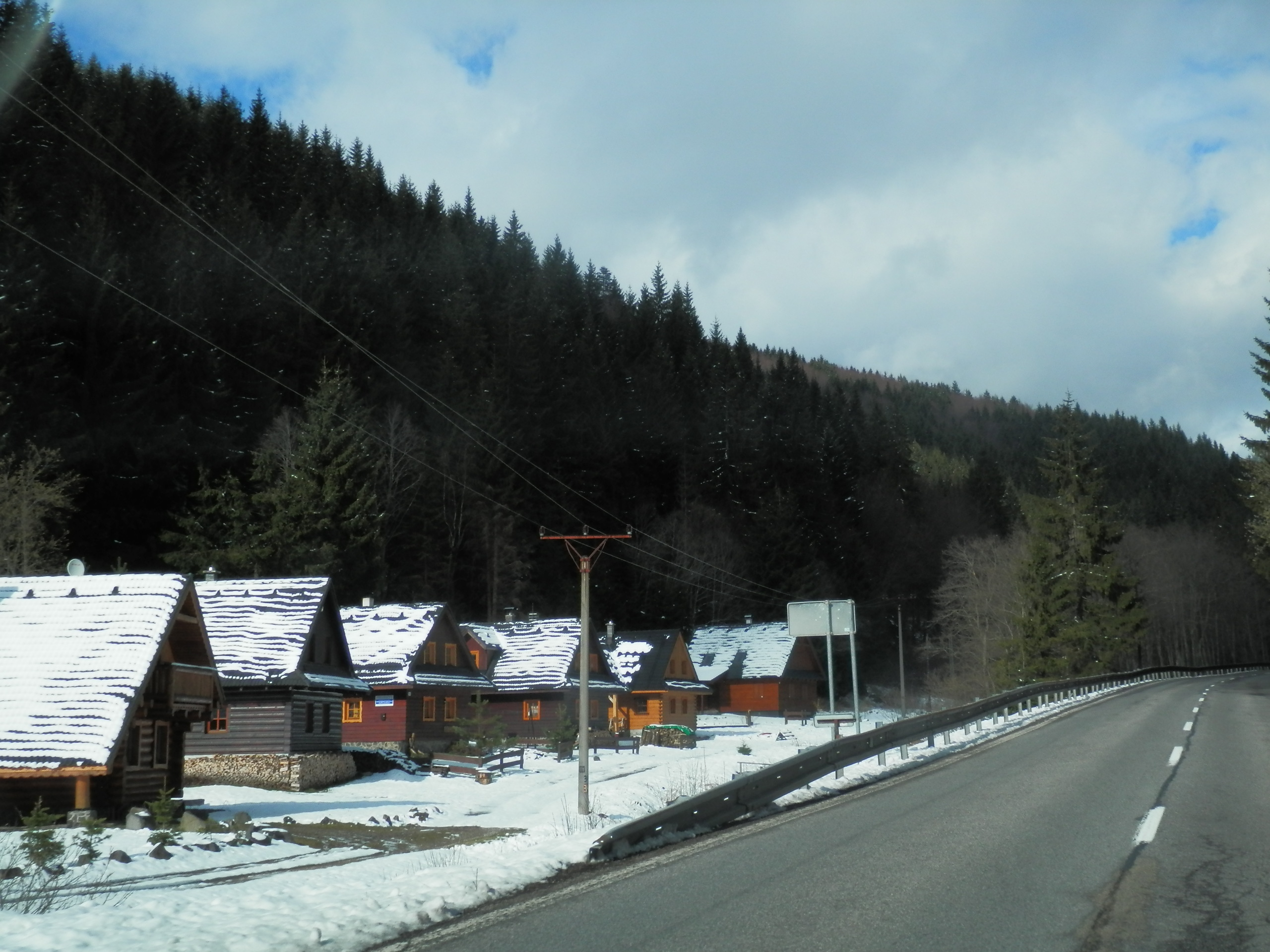

- Flag

- Location of Jarabá in the Banská Bystrica Region Location of Jarabá in Slovakia
- Coordinates: 48.88°N 19.68°E
- Country: Slovakia
- Region: Banská Bystrica Region
- District: Brezno District
- First mentioned: 1540

Area
  - Total: 15.38 km^{2} (5.94 sq mi)
- Elevation: 840 m (2,760 ft)

Population (2025)
  - Total: 33
- Time zone: UTC+1 (CET)
  - Summer (DST): UTC+2 (CEST)
- Postal code: 977 01
- Area code: +421 48
- Vehicle registration plate (until 2022): BR
- Website: www.jaraba.sk

Jarabá (German: Briegarten; Hungarian: Jarabó, until 1899: Jaraba) is a village and municipality in Brezno District, in the Banská Bystrica Region of central Slovakia.

== Geography ==
The municipality lies at an altitude of 840 metres (2,760 ft) and covers an area of 15.38 km^{2} (5.94 sq mi) (2025).

== History ==
In historical records, the village was first mentioned in 1540 as a mining settlement.

== Population ==
Population statistic (10 years)
Year	1995	2005	2015	2025
Count	36	50	41	33
Difference		+38.88%	−18%	−19.51%

Population statistic
Year	2024	2025
Count	36	33
Difference		−8.33%

It has a population of 33 people (31 December 2025).

=== Ethnicity ===
Census 2021 (1+ %)
Ethnicity	Number	Fraction
Slovak	37	94.87%
Czech	1	2.56%
Not found out	1	2.56%
Total	39	

In year 2021 was 39 people by ethnicity 37 as Slovak, 1 as Czech and 1 as Not found out.

Note on population: The difference values of population numbers in the table "Population statistic" and in the sections "Ethnicity" & "Religion" is caused by the use of various statistical methods.

=== Religion ===
Census 2021 (1+ %)
Religion	Number	Fraction
Roman Catholic Church	18	46.15%
None	16	41.03%
Evangelical Church	4	10.26%
Not found out	1	2.56%
Total	39	

In year 2021 was 39 people by religion 18 from Roman Catholic Church, 16 from None, 4 from Evangelical Church and 1 from Not found out.

== Genealogical resources ==
The records for genealogical research are available for Jarabá at the state archive "Statny Archiv in Banska Bystrica, Slovakia"

- Roman Catholic church records (births/marriages/deaths): 1656-1904 (parish B)
- Lutheran church records (births/marriages/deaths): 1784-1896 (parish B)

== See also ==
- List of municipalities and towns in Slovakia
