= Michalová =

Michalová Mihálytelek
- Municipality
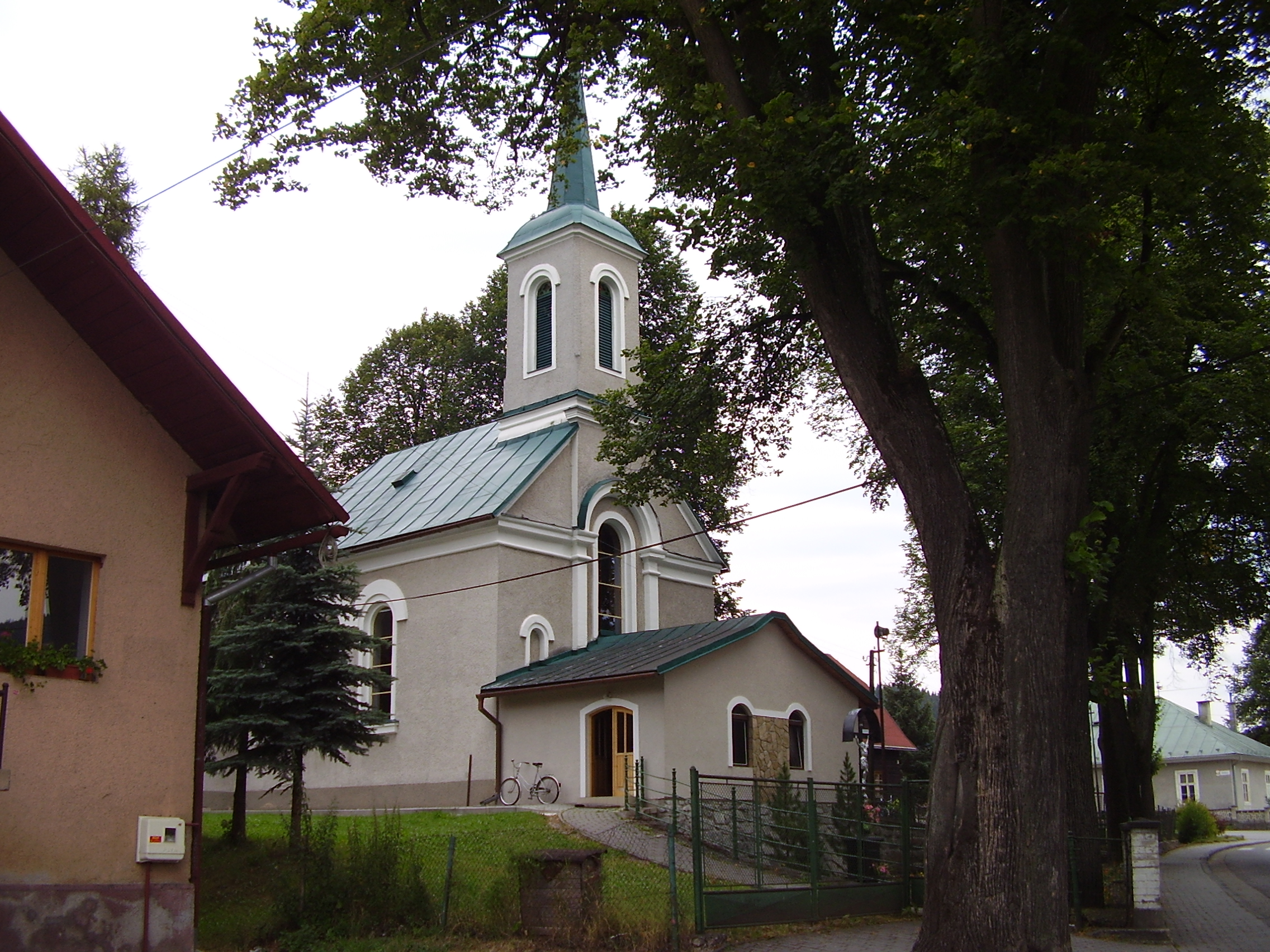

- Flag

- Location of Michalová in the Banská Bystrica Region Location of Michalová in Slovakia
- Coordinates: 48.77°N 19.78°E
- Country: Slovakia
- Region: Banská Bystrica Region
- District: Brezno District
- First mentioned: 1786

Area
  - Total: 14.32 km^{2} (5.53 sq mi)
- Elevation: 586 m (1,923 ft)

Population (2025)
  - Total: 1,183
- Time zone: UTC+1 (CET)
  - Summer (DST): UTC+2 (CEST)
- Postal code: 976 57
- Area code: +421 48
- Vehicle registration plate (until 2022): BR
- Website: www.michalova.sk

Michalová (Hungarian: Mihálytelek) is a village and municipality in Brezno District, in the Banská Bystrica Region of central Slovakia.

== Geography ==
The municipality lies at an altitude of 586 metres (1,923 ft) and covers an area of 14.32 km^{2} (5.53 sq mi) (2025).

== Population ==
Population statistic (10 years)
Year	1995	2005	2015	2025
Count	1364	1398	1355	1183
Difference		+2.49%	−3.07%	−12.69%

Population statistic
Year	2024	2025
Count	1208	1183
Difference		−2.06%

It has a population of 1183 people (31 December 2025).

=== Ethnicity ===
Census 2021 (1+ %)
Ethnicity	Number	Fraction
Slovak	1235	95.66%
Not found out	52	4.02%
Total	1291	

In year 2021 was 1291 people by ethnicity 1235 as Slovak, 52 as Not found out, 4 as Russian, 3 as Czech, 2 as Serbian, 2 as Rusyn, 2 as Hungarian, 2 as Other, 2 as Croatian, 1 as Jewish, 1 as Polish and 1 as Bulgarian.

Note on population: The difference values of population numbers in the table "Population statistic" and in the sections "Ethnicity" & "Religion" is caused by the use of various statistical methods.

=== Religion ===
Census 2021 (1+ %)
Religion	Number	Fraction
Roman Catholic Church	975	75.52%
None	202	15.65%
Not found out	64	4.96%
Evangelical Church	25	1.94%
Total	1291	

In year 2021 was 1291 people by religion 975 from Roman Catholic Church, 202 from None, 64 from Not found out, 25 from Evangelical Church, 7 from Greek Catholic Church, 7 from Ad hoc movements, 2 from Calvinist Church, 2 from Other and not ascertained christian church, 2 from Christian Congregations in Slovakia, 2 from Buddhism, 1 from Eastern Orthodox Church, 1 from Other and 1 from United Methodist Church.
