= Mýto pod Ďumbierom =

Mýto pod Ďumbierom Vámos
- Municipality
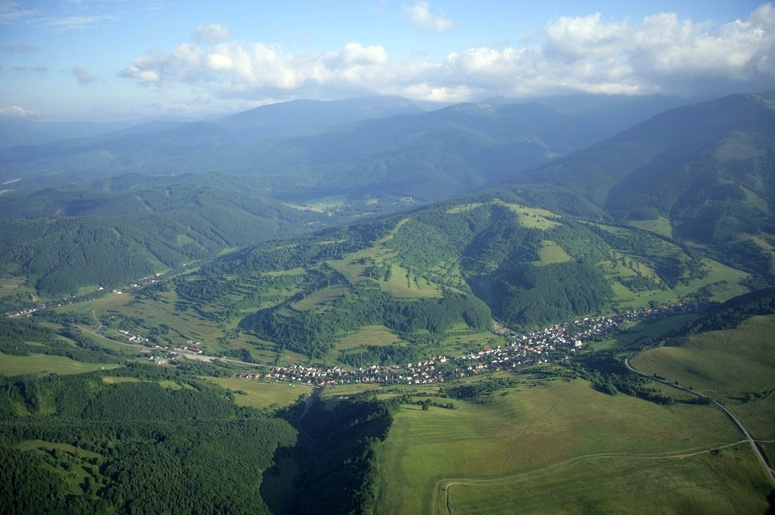

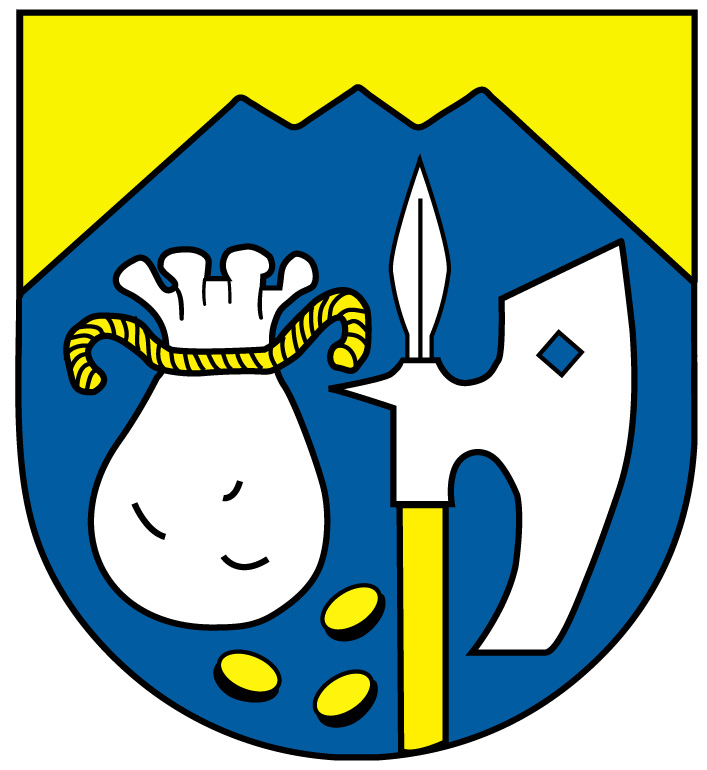
- Flag Coat of arms

- Location of Mýto pod Ďumbierom in the Banská Bystrica Region Location of Mýto pod Ďumbierom in Slovakia
- Coordinates: 48.85°N 19.63°E
- Country: Slovakia
- Region: Banská Bystrica Region
- District: Brezno District
- First mentioned: 1696

Area
  - Total: 10.39 km^{2} (4.01 sq mi)
- Elevation: 621 m (2,037 ft)

Population (2025)
  - Total: 495
- Time zone: UTC+1 (CET)
  - Summer (DST): UTC+2 (CEST)
- Postal code: 976 44
- Area code: +421 48
- Vehicle registration plate (until 2022): BR
- Website: mytopoddumbierom.sk

Mýto pod Ďumbierom (Hungarian: Vámos) is a village and municipality in Brezno District, in the Banská Bystrica Region of central Slovakia.

== Geography ==
The municipality lies at an altitude of 621 metres (2,037 ft) and covers an area of 10.39 km^{2} (4.01 sq mi) (2025).

== Population ==
Population statistic (10 years)
Year	1995	2005	2015	2025
Count	570	545	515	495
Difference		−4.38%	−5.50%	−3.88%

Population statistic
Year	2024	2025
Count	500	495
Difference		−1%

It has a population of 495 people (31 December 2025).

=== Ethnicity ===
Census 2021 (1+ %)
Ethnicity	Number	Fraction
Slovak	497	94.66%
Not found out	9	1.71%
Hungarian	9	1.71%
Other	7	1.33%
Ukrainian	6	1.14%
Total	525	

In year 2021 was 525 people by ethnicity 497 as Slovak, 9 as Not found out, 9 as Hungarian, 7 as Other, 6 as Ukrainian, 4 as Czech, 4 as Rusyn, 3 as German, 1 as Romani, 1 as Polish, 1 as Canadian and 1 as English.

Note on population: The difference values of population numbers in the table "Population statistic" and in the sections "Ethnicity" & "Religion" is caused by the use of various statistical methods.

=== Religion ===
Census 2021 (1+ %)
Religion	Number	Fraction
Roman Catholic Church	222	42.29%
None	168	32%
Evangelical Church	94	17.9%
Not found out	10	1.9%
Greek Catholic Church	8	1.52%
Eastern Orthodox Church	7	1.33%
Total	525	

In year 2021 was 525 people by religion 222 from Roman Catholic Church, 168 from None, 94 from Evangelical Church, 10 from Not found out, 8 from Greek Catholic Church, 7 from Eastern Orthodox Church, 4 from Jehovah's Witnesses, 3 from Paganism and natural spirituality, 2 from Calvinist Church, 2 from Other and not ascertained christian church, 2 from Other, 1 from Islam, 1 from Czechoslovak Hussite Church and 1 from Ad hoc movements.
