= Závadka nad Hronom =

Závadka nad Hronom Ágostonlak
- Municipality
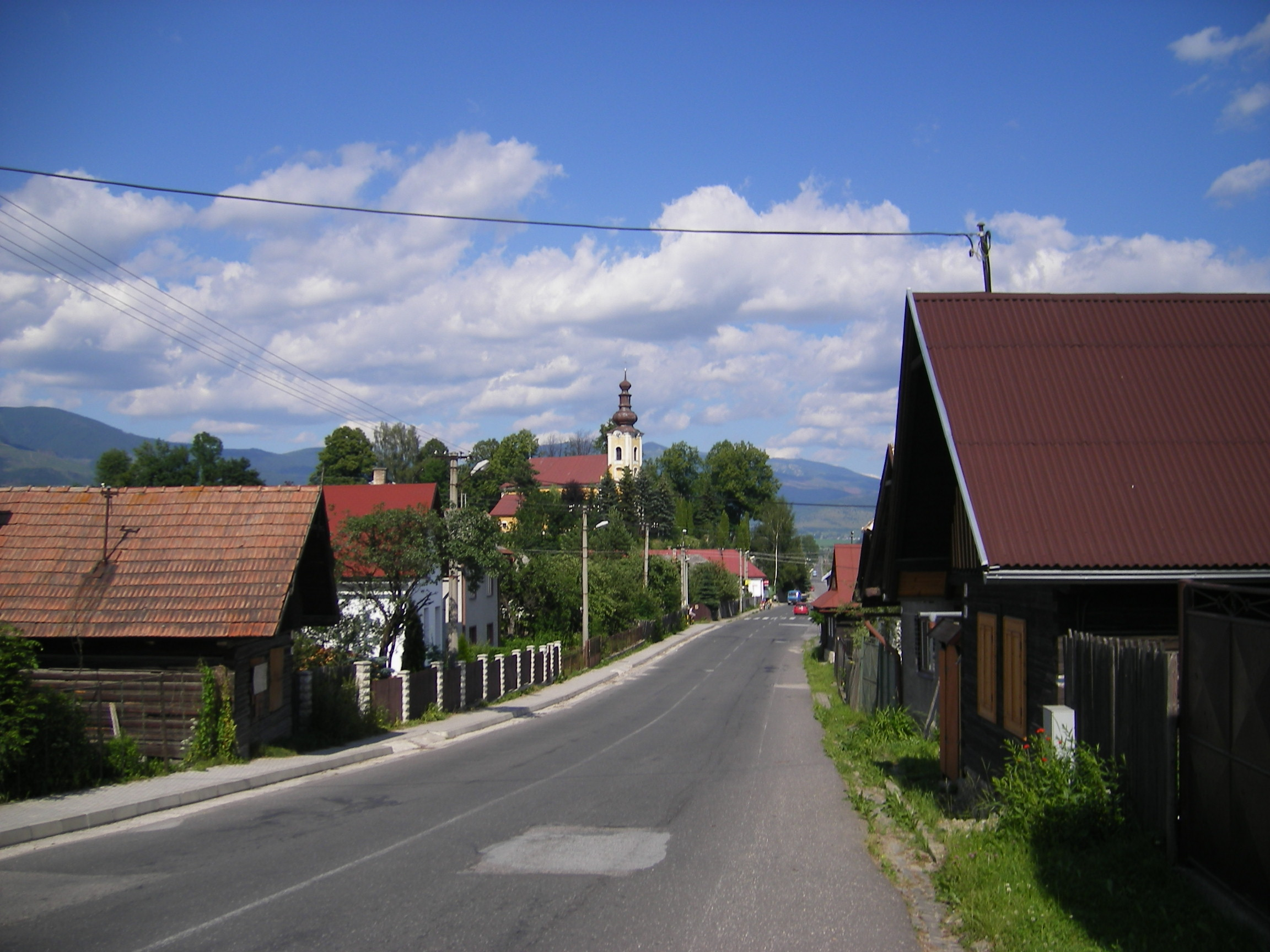

- Flag

- Location of Závadka nad Hronom in the Banská Bystrica Region Location of Závadka nad Hronom in Slovakia
- Coordinates: 48.85°N 19.92°E
- Country: Slovakia
- Region: Banská Bystrica Region
- District: Brezno District
- First mentioned: 1611

Area
  - Total: 41.18 km^{2} (15.90 sq mi)
- Elevation: 618 m (2,028 ft)

Population (2025)
  - Total: 2,082
- Time zone: UTC+1 (CET)
  - Summer (DST): UTC+2 (CEST)
- Postal code: 976 67
- Area code: +421 48
- Vehicle registration plate (until 2022): BR
- Website: www.zavadkanadhronom.sk

Závadka nad Hronom (Hungarian: Ágostonlak) is a village and municipality in Brezno District, in the Banská Bystrica Region of central Slovakia.

== Geography ==
The municipality lies at an altitude of 618 metres (2,028 ft) and covers an area of 41.18 km^{2} (15.90 sq mi) (2025). The Hornád River flows through the village.

== Population ==
Population statistic (10 years)
Year	1995	2005	2015	2025
Count	2581	2464	2394	2082
Difference		−4.53%	−2.84%	−13.03%

Population statistic
Year	2024	2025
Count	2099	2082
Difference		−0.80%

It has a population of 2082 people (31 December 2025).

=== Ethnicity ===
Census 2021 (1+ %)
Ethnicity	Number	Fraction
Slovak	1975	90.84%
Not found out	180	8.27%
Romani	107	4.92%
Total	2174	

In year 2021 was 2174 people by ethnicity 1975 as Slovak, 180 as Not found out, 107 as Romani, 13 as Czech, 6 as Other, 4 as Hungarian, 2 as Ukrainian, 2 as Polish, 1 as Italian, 1 as Rusyn, 1 as Russian, 1 as Austrian and 1 as German.

Note on population: The difference values of population numbers in the table "Population statistic" and in the sections "Ethnicity" & "Religion" is caused by the use of various statistical methods.

=== Religion ===
Census 2021 (1+ %)
Religion	Number	Fraction
Roman Catholic Church	1440	66.24%
None	403	18.54%
Not found out	192	8.83%
Greek Catholic Church	41	1.89%
Evangelical Church	37	1.7%
Total	2174	

In year 2021 was 2174 people by religion 1440 from Roman Catholic Church, 403 from None, 192 from Not found out, 41 from Greek Catholic Church, 37 from Evangelical Church, 19 from Jehovah's Witnesses, 11 from Christian Congregations in Slovakia, 11 from Baptists Church, 7 from Other, 5 from Ad hoc movements, 2 from Eastern Orthodox Church, 2 from Other and not ascertained christian church, 2 from Church of the Brethren, 1 from Calvinist Church and 1 from United Methodist Church.
