= Brezno District =

Coordinates: 48°48′N 19°45′E

- District
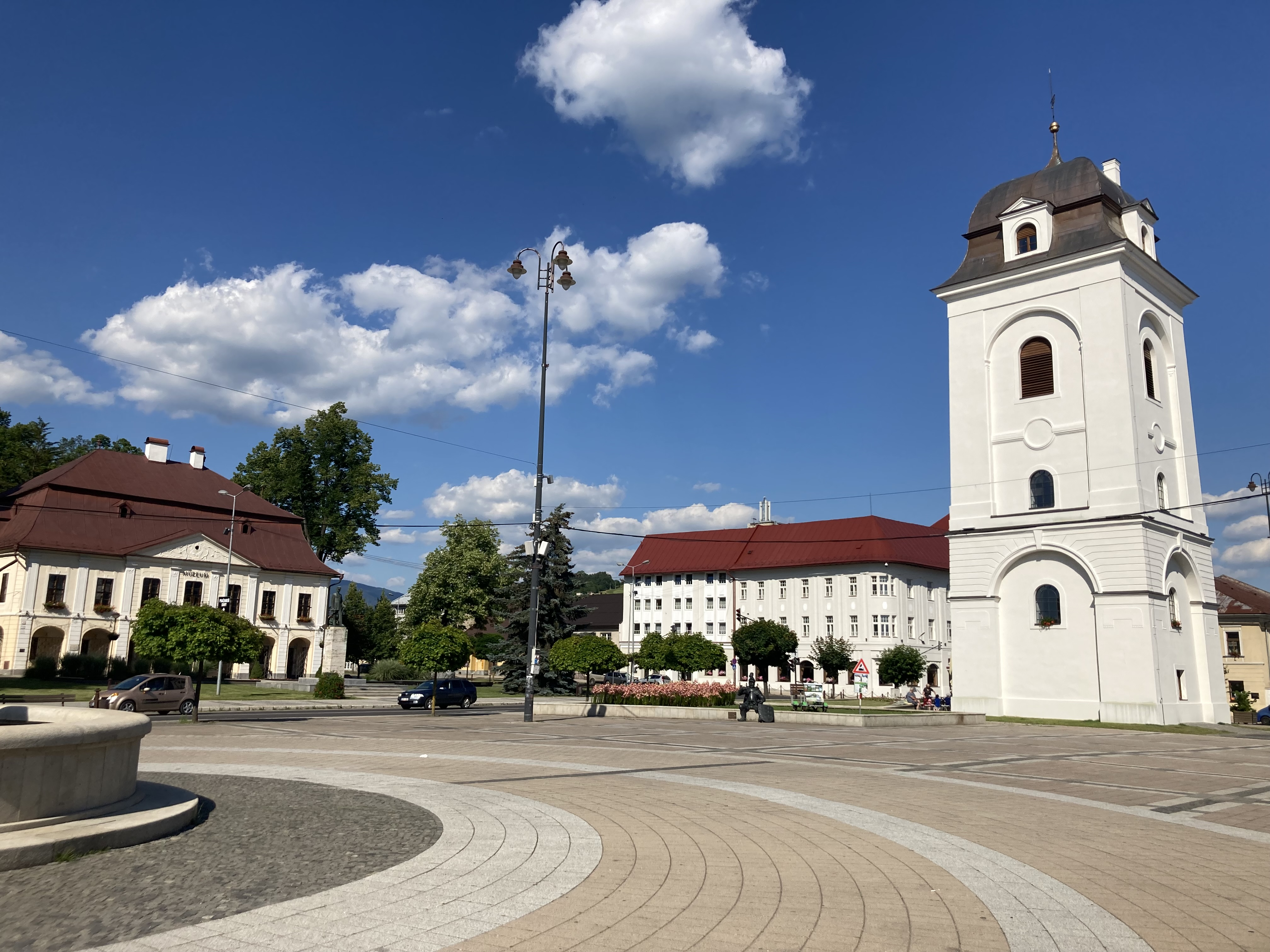
- Country: Slovakia
- Region (kraj): Banská Bystrica Region
- Seat: Brezno

Area
  - Total: 1,265.24 km^{2} (488.51 sq mi)

Population (2025)
  - Total: 57,517
- Time zone: UTC+1 (CET)
  - Summer (DST): UTC+2 (CEST)
- Telephone prefix: 048
- Vehicle registration plate (until 2022): BR
- Municipalities: 30

Brezno District (Slovak: okres Brezno; Hungarian: Breznóbányai járás) is a district in the Banská Bystrica Region of central Slovakia. It was first established in 1923 and in its present borders exists from 1996.

== Population ==
Population statistic (10 years)
Year	1995	2005	2015	2025
Count	66,182	64,881	62,616	57,517
Difference		−1.96%	−3.49%	−8.14%

Population statistic
Year	2024	2025
Count	57,916	57,517
Difference		−0.68%

It has a population of 57,517 people (31 December 2025).

Historical population
Year	Pop.	±%
1970	66,841	—
1980	67,625	+1.2%
1991	66,410	−1.8%
2001	65,909	−0.8%
2011	64,196	−2.6%
2021	59,446	−7.4%
Source: Statistical Office of the Slovak Republic

=== Ethnicity ===
Census 2021 (1+ %)
Ethnicity	Number	Fraction
Slovak	55,552	89.38%
Not found out	3304	5.31%
Romani	2222	3.57%
Total	62,148	

In year 2021 was 62,148 people by ethnicity 55,552 as Slovak, 3304 as Not found out, 2222 as Romani, 376 as Czech, 136 as Other, 117 as Hungarian, 83 as Rusyn, 63 as Russian, 56 as Ukrainian, 46 as German, 33 as Polish, 32 as Moravian, 27 as Vietnamese, 25 as Italian, 11 as Jewish, 10 as Serbian, 8 as Croatian, 6 as Chinese, 6 as Austrian, 5 as Canadian, 5 as French, 5 as English, 4 as Irish, 4 as Romanian, 4 as Greek, 3 as Bulgarian, 3 as Albanian, 1 as Turkish and 1 as Silesian.

Note on population: The difference values of population numbers in the table "Population statistic" and in the sections "Ethnicity" & "Religion" is caused by the use of various statistical methods.

=== Religion ===
Census 2021 (1+ %)
Religion	Number	Fraction
Roman Catholic Church	35,626	59.93%
None	14,055	23.64%
Not found out	4155	6.99%
Greek Catholic Church	2292	3.86%
Evangelical Church	2001	3.37%
Total	59,446	

In year 2021 was 59,446 people by religion 35,626 from Roman Catholic Church, 14,055 from None, 4155 from Not found out, 2292 from Greek Catholic Church, 2001 from Evangelical Church, 291 from Christian Congregations in Slovakia, 161 from Ad hoc movements, 147 from Other, 142 from Jehovah's Witnesses, 141 from Other and not ascertained christian church, 124 from Eastern Orthodox Church, 63 from Paganism and natural spirituality, 46 from Calvinist Church, 28 from Buddhism, 28 from Baptists Church, 26 from Islam, 24 from United Methodist Church, 23 from Apostolic Church, 21 from Seventh-day Adventist Church, 18 from Old Catholic Church, 9 from Church of the Brethren, 7 from Bahá'i Community, 6 from Hinduism, 5 from Czechoslovak Hussite Church, 4 from Church of Jesus Christ of Latter-day Saints and 3 from Jewish community.

== Municipalities ==
Municipality	Area [km^{2}]	Population
Bacúch	38.18	876
Beňuš	26.77	1,153
Braväcovo	29.40	621
Brezno	121.96	19,577
Bystrá	15.88	156
Čierny Balog	147.17	4,887
Dolná Lehota	55.45	685
Drábsko	4.76	152
Heľpa	41.70	2,363
Horná Lehota	45.85	561
Hronec	35.13	1,116
Jarabá	15.38	33
Jasenie	86.16	1,166
Lom nad Rimavicou	17.40	213
Michalová	14.32	1,183
Mýto pod Ďumbierom	10.39	495
Nemecká	24.63	1,691
Osrblie	24.01	335
Podbrezová	18.55	3,445
Pohorelá	46.93	2,020
Pohronská Polhora	35.76	1,671
Polomka	94.03	2,870
Predajná	23.19	1,248
Ráztoka	8.07	271
Sihla	26.82	175
Šumiac	81.79	1,295
Telgárt	56.00	1,517
Valaská	63.33	3,267
Vaľkovňa	14.86	393
Závadka nad Hronom	41.18	2,082

Population and area values are current for year 2025.
