= Vepor Mountains =

Mountain range in Slovakia

Coordinates: 48°42′N 19°48′E

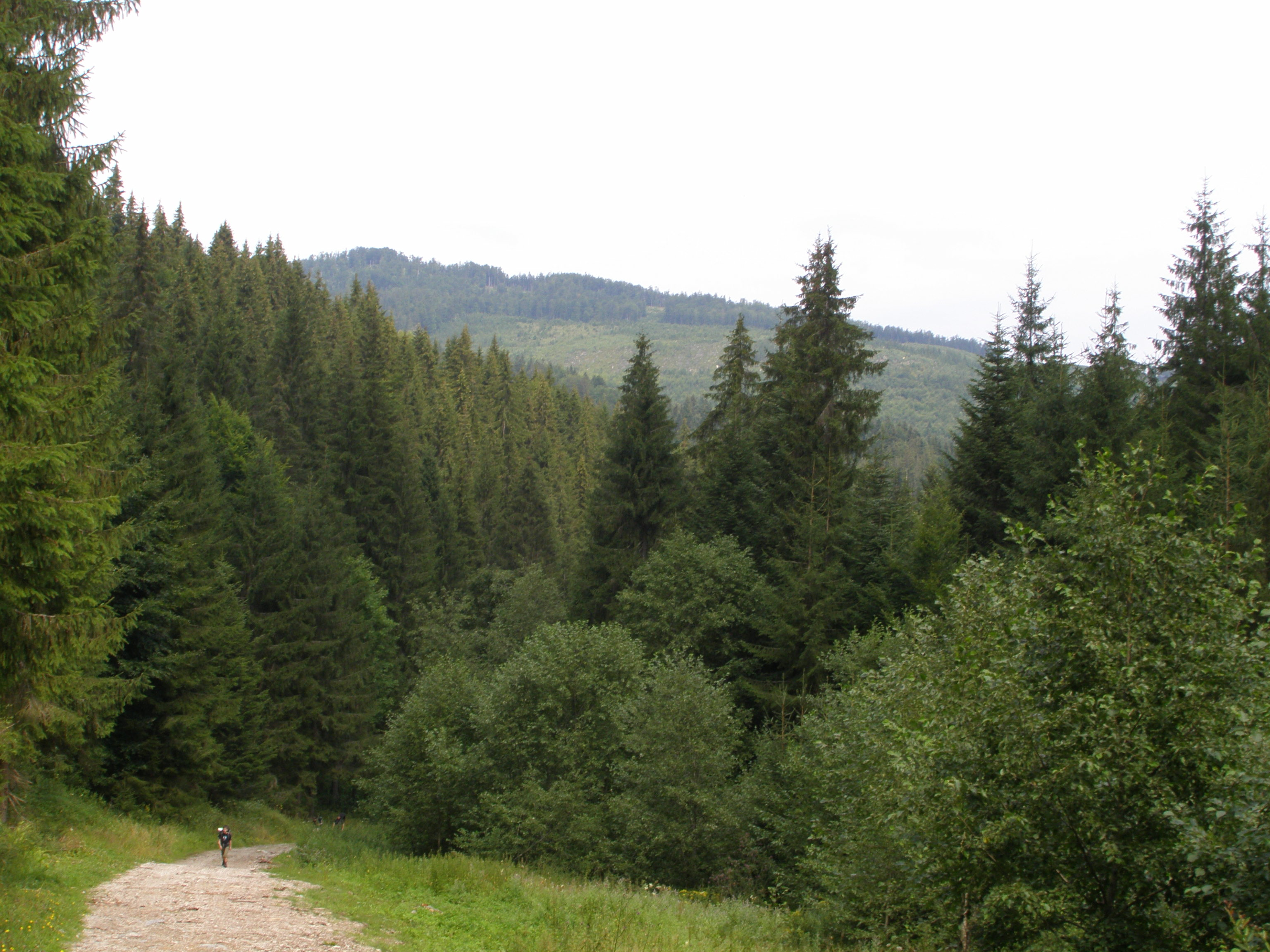
Balocké Hills

Vepor Mountains (Slovak: Veporské vrchy) are a mountain range in Slovakia, a subdivision of Erzgebirge in Spiš region.

== Notable features ==
- Fabova hola
- Sihlianska plateau
- Balocké vrchy

== See also ==
- Muránska planina National Park
