= Beňuš =

Beňuš Benesháza
- Municipality
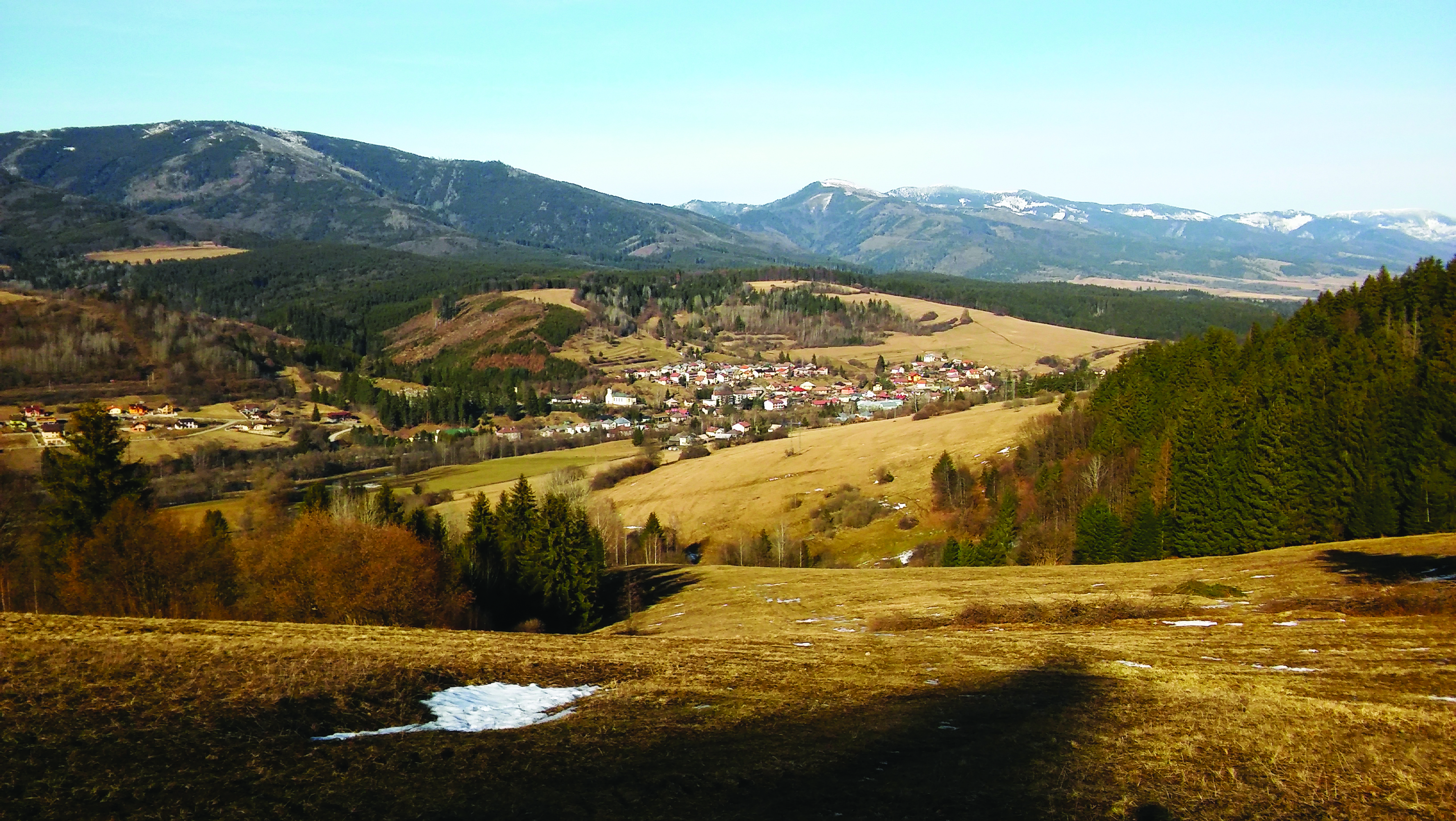

- Flag

- Location of Beňuš in the Banská Bystrica Region Location of Beňuš in Slovakia
- Coordinates: 48.83°N 19.77°E
- Country: Slovakia
- Region: Banská Bystrica Region
- District: Brezno District
- First mentioned: 1380

Area
  - Total: 26.77 km^{2} (10.34 sq mi)
- Elevation: 544 m (1,785 ft)

Population (2025)
  - Total: 1,153
- Time zone: UTC+1 (CET)
  - Summer (DST): UTC+2 (CEST)
- Postal code: 976 64
- Area code: +421 48
- Vehicle registration plate (until 2022): BR

Beňuš (German: Beneschhau; Hungarian: Benesháza; Latin: Benesium) is a village and municipality in Brezno District, in the Banská Bystrica Region of central Slovakia.

== Geography ==
The municipality lies at an altitude of 544 metres (1,785 ft) and covers an area of 26.77 km^{2} (10.34 sq mi) (2025).

== History ==
In historical records, the village was first mentioned in 1380 (Beneshawa) as a mining village, in 1563 it is mentioned as a free woodmen's village. In the 14th century, some Germans established here (from I. Lasslob "Deutsche Ortsnamen in der Slowakei"). In 1563 it belonged to Banská Bystrica’s Mining Chamber. In 1642, members of Bloom federation hosted the vystružovanie dier strany. Only the tablets of zadky were left standing.

== Population ==
Population statistic (10 years)
Year	1995	2005	2015	2025
Count	1186	1196	1172	1153
Difference		+0.84%	−2.00%	−1.62%

Population statistic
Year	2024	2025
Count	1145	1153
Difference		+0.69%

It has a population of 1153 people (31 December 2025).

=== Ethnicity ===
Census 2021 (1+ %)
Ethnicity	Number	Fraction
Slovak	1120	97.22%
Not found out	28	2.43%
Romani	18	1.56%
Total	1152	

In year 2021 was 1152 people by ethnicity 1120 as Slovak, 28 as Not found out, 18 as Romani, 8 as Czech, 3 as Rusyn, 1 as Russian, 1 as Austrian and 1 as Other.

Note on population: The difference values of population numbers in the table "Population statistic" and in the sections "Ethnicity" & "Religion" is caused by the use of various statistical methods.

=== Religion ===
Census 2021 (1+ %)
Religion	Number	Fraction
Roman Catholic Church	820	71.18%
None	248	21.53%
Not found out	26	2.26%
Evangelical Church	21	1.82%
Greek Catholic Church	17	1.48%
Total	1152	

In year 2021 was 1152 people by religion 820 from Roman Catholic Church, 248 from None, 26 from Not found out, 21 from Evangelical Church, 17 from Greek Catholic Church, 4 from Other and not ascertained christian church, 4 from Other, 3 from Eastern Orthodox Church, 3 from Christian Congregations in Slovakia, 2 from Calvinist Church, 1 from Paganism and natural spirituality, 1 from Church of the Brethren, 1 from Buddhism and 1 from Ad hoc movements.

== Genealogical resources ==
The records for genealogical research are available at the state archive "Statny Archiv in Banska Bystrica, Slovakia"

- Roman Catholic church records (births/marriages/deaths): 1656–1896 (parish A)

== See also ==
- List of municipalities and towns in Slovakia
