= Sihla =

Sihla Szikla
- Municipality
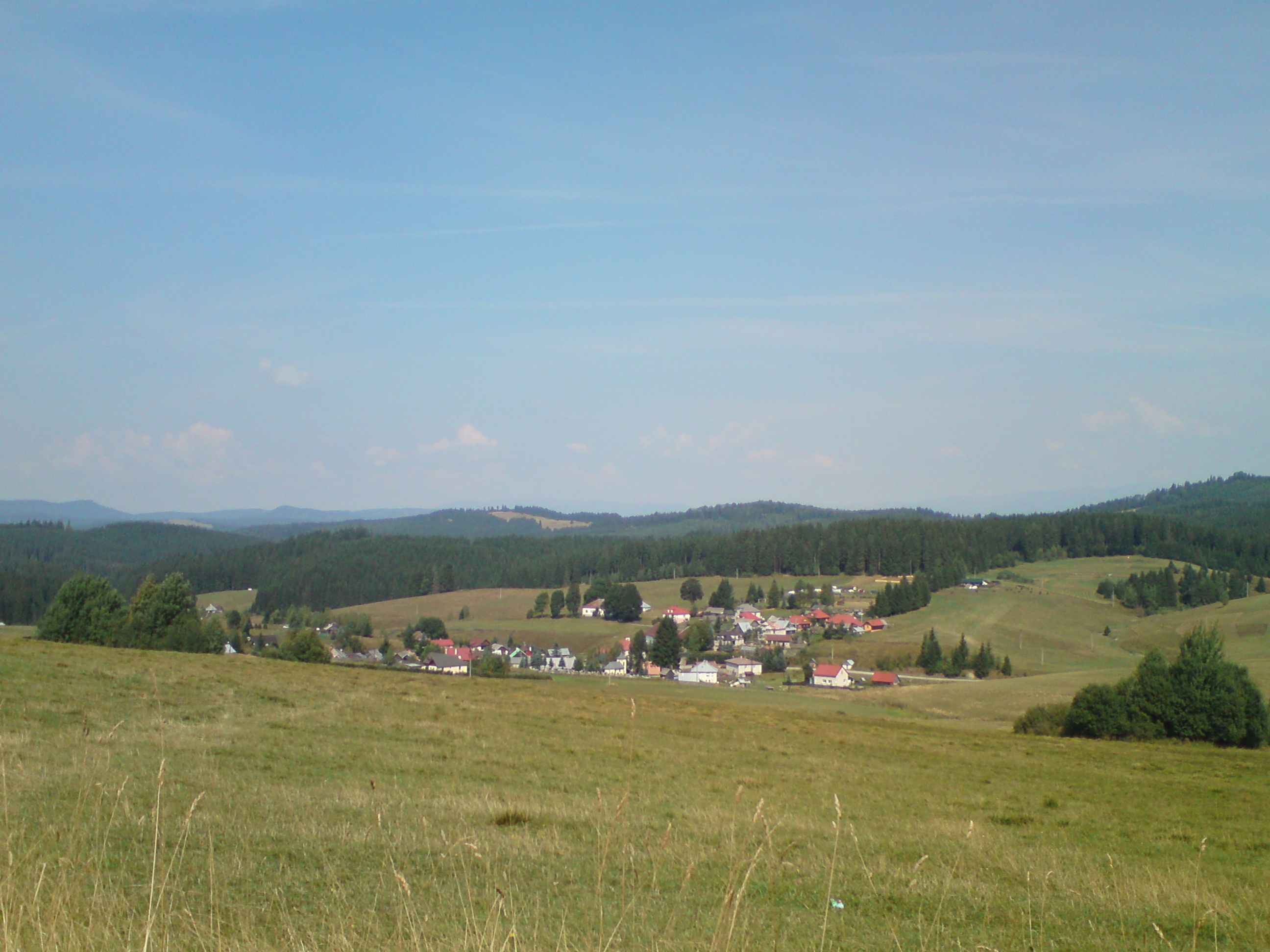

- Flag

- Location of Sihla in the Banská Bystrica Region Location of Sihla in Slovakia
- Coordinates: 48.65°N 19.63°E
- Country: Slovakia
- Region: Banská Bystrica Region
- District: Brezno District
- First mentioned: 1744

Area
  - Total: 26.82 km^{2} (10.36 sq mi)
- Elevation: 901 m (2,956 ft)

Population (2025)
  - Total: 175
- Time zone: UTC+1 (CET)
  - Summer (DST): UTC+2 (CEST)
- Postal code: 976 53
- Area code: +421 48
- Vehicle registration plate (until 2022): BR
- Website: www.sihla.sk

Sihla (Hungarian: Szikla) is a village and municipality in Brezno District, in the Banská Bystrica Region of central Slovakia.

== Geography ==
The municipality lies at an altitude of 901 metres (2,956 ft) and covers an area of 26.82 km^{2} (10.36 sq mi) (2025).

== Population ==
Population statistic (10 years)
Year	1995	2005	2015	2025
Count	200	202	190	175
Difference		+1%	−5.94%	−7.89%

Population statistic
Year	2024	2025
Count	177	175
Difference		−1.12%

It has a population of 175 people (31 December 2025).

=== Ethnicity ===
Census 2021 (1+ %)
Ethnicity	Number	Fraction
Slovak	197	100%
Total	197	

In year 2021 was 197 people by ethnicity 197 as Slovak, 1 as Czech and 1 as Not found out.

Note on population: The difference values of population numbers in the table "Population statistic" and in the sections "Ethnicity" & "Religion" is caused by the use of various statistical methods.

=== Religion ===
Census 2021 (1+ %)
Religion	Number	Fraction
Roman Catholic Church	170	86.29%
None	18	9.14%
Not found out	3	1.52%
Evangelical Church	3	1.52%
Total	197	

In year 2021 was 197 people by religion 170 from Roman Catholic Church, 18 from None, 3 from Not found out, 3 from Evangelical Church, 1 from Islam, 1 from Other and 1 from Ad hoc movements.
