= Predajná =

Predajná Garampéteri
- Municipality
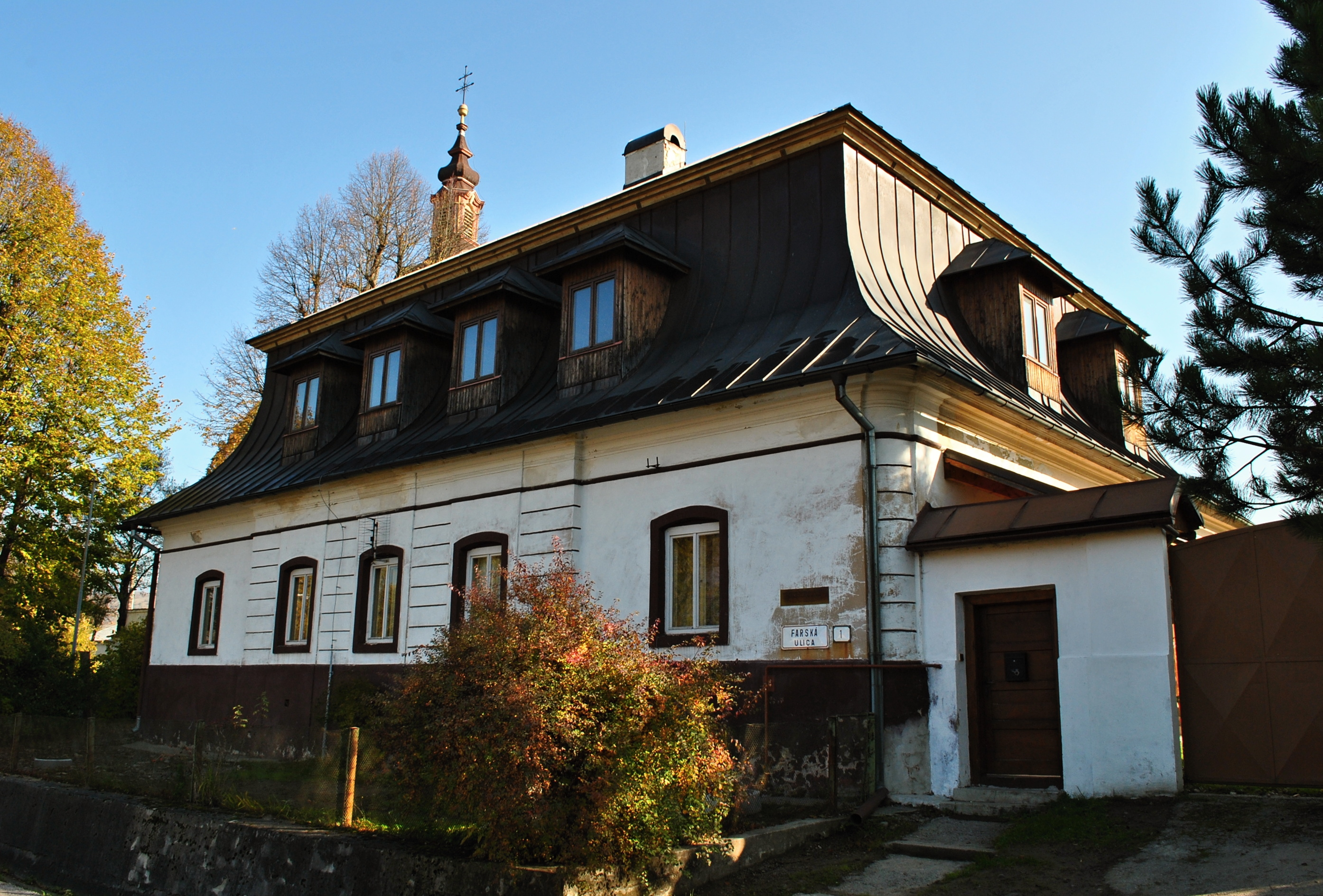

- Flag Coat of arms

- Location of Predajná in the Banská Bystrica Region Location of Predajná in Slovakia
- Coordinates: 48.75°N 19.78°E
- Country: Slovakia
- Region: Banská Bystrica Region
- District: Brezno District
- First mentioned: 1284

Area
  - Total: 23.19 km^{2} (8.95 sq mi)
- Elevation: 452 m (1,483 ft)

Population (2025)
  - Total: 1,248
- Time zone: UTC+1 (CET)
  - Summer (DST): UTC+2 (CEST)
- Postal code: 976 63
- Area code: +421 48
- Vehicle registration plate (until 2022): BR
- Website: www.obecpredajna.sk

Predajná (Hungarian: Garampéteri) is a village and municipality in the Brezno District, of the Banská Bystrica Region, located in central Slovakia.

== Geography ==
The municipality lies at an altitude of 452 metres (1,483 ft) and covers an area of 23.19 km^{2} (8.95 sq mi) (2025).

== Population ==
Population statistic (10 years)
Year	1995	2005	2015	2025
Count	1246	1386	1349	1248
Difference		+11.23%	−2.66%	−7.48%

Population statistic
Year	2024	2025
Count	1265	1248
Difference		−1.34%

It has a population of 1248 people (31 December 2025).

=== Ethnicity ===
Census 2021 (1+ %)
Ethnicity	Number	Fraction
Slovak	1216	93.46%
Not found out	77	5.91%
Total	1301	

In year 2021 was 1301 people by ethnicity 1216 as Slovak, 77 as Not found out, 11 as Czech, 4 as Italian, 4 as Other, 3 as Rusyn, 2 as Hungarian, 1 as Romani, 1 as Russian, 1 as Polish, 1 as Canadian and 1 as English.

Note on population: The difference values of population numbers in the table "Population statistic" and in the sections "Ethnicity" & "Religion" is caused by the use of various statistical methods.

=== Religion ===
Census 2021 (1+ %)
Religion	Number	Fraction
Roman Catholic Church	767	58.95%
None	366	28.13%
Not found out	92	7.07%
Evangelical Church	38	2.92%
Greek Catholic Church	13	1%
Total	1301	

In year 2021 was 1301 people by religion 767 from Roman Catholic Church, 366 from None, 92 from Not found out, 38 from Evangelical Church, 13 from Greek Catholic Church, 8 from Ad hoc movements, 7 from Other, 5 from Christian Congregations in Slovakia, 3 from Other and not ascertained christian church, 1 from United Methodist Church and 1 from Seventh-day Adventist Church.
