= Gömör and Kishont County =

County of the Kingdom of Hungary

Gömör-Kishont County Comitatus Geomoriensis et Kishonthensis (Latin) Gömör és Kishont vármegye (Hungarian) Komitat Gemer und Kleinhont (German) Gemersko-malohontská župa (Slovak)
- County of the Kingdom of Hungary (1802-1923, 1938-1945)
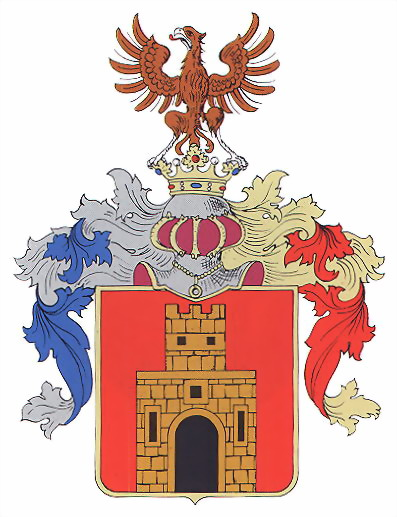
- Coat of arms

- Capital: Rimaszombat; Putnok (1920-1923)
- Area
  - Coordinates: 48°23′N 20°1′E
  - 1910: 4,279 km^{2} (1,652 sq mi)
- Population
  - 1910: 188,098
- History
  - Established: 1802
  - Treaty of Trianon: 4 June 1920
  - Merged into Borsod-Gömör County: 1923
  - County recreated (First Vienna Award): 1938
  - Remerged into Borsod-Gömör County: 1945
- Today part of: Slovakia (3,956 km^{2}); Hungary (323 km^{2})
- Rimavská Sobota is the current name of the capital.

Gömör-Kishont (Hungarian: Gömör és Kishont, Slovak: Gemer a Malohont, German: Gemer und Kleinhont) was an administrative county (comitatus) of the Kingdom of Hungary. Its capital was Rimaszombat (present-day Rimavská Sobota). Most of its territory is now part of Slovakia, while a smaller part belongs to Hungary.

== Geography ==
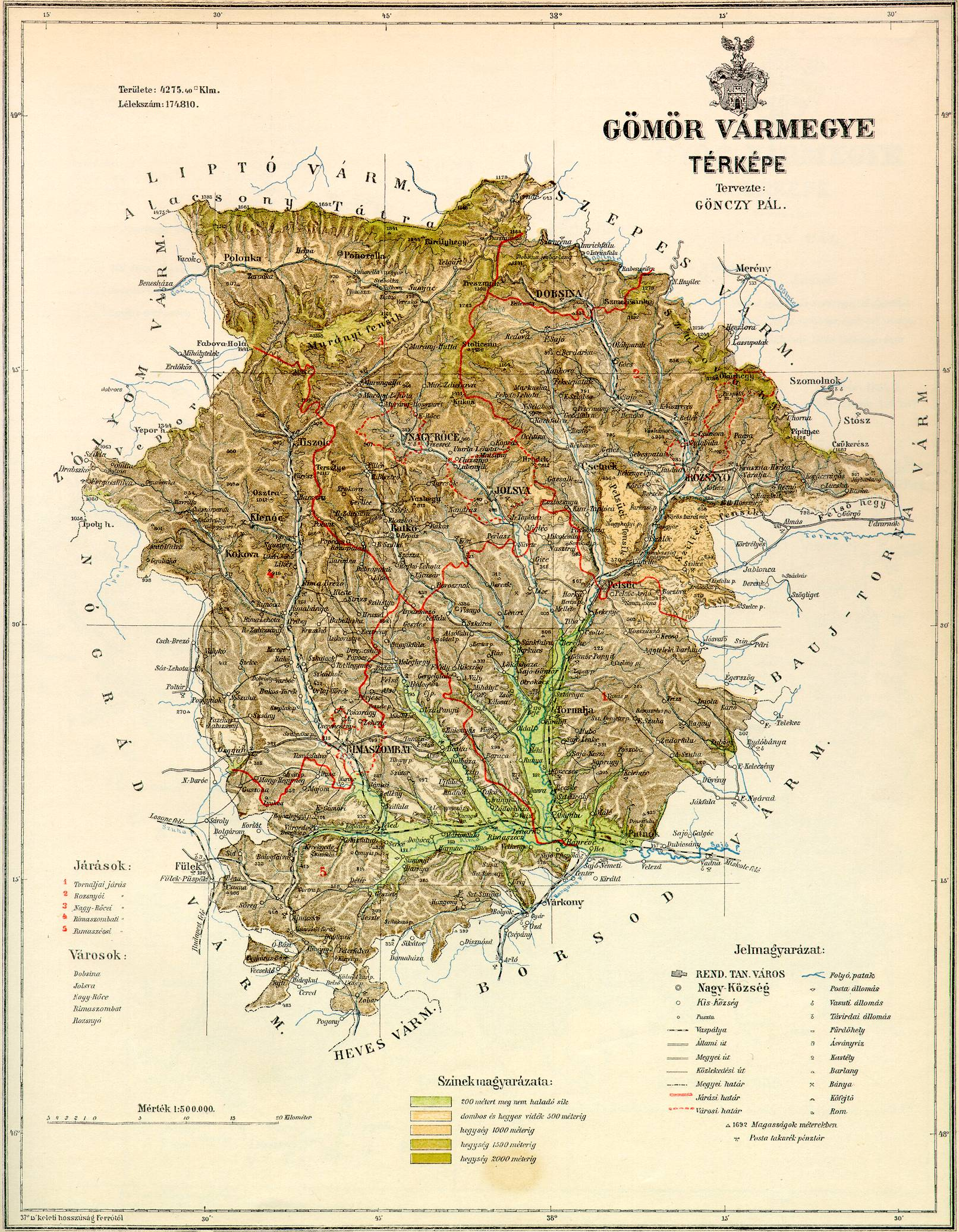
Map of Gömör-Kishont, 1891.

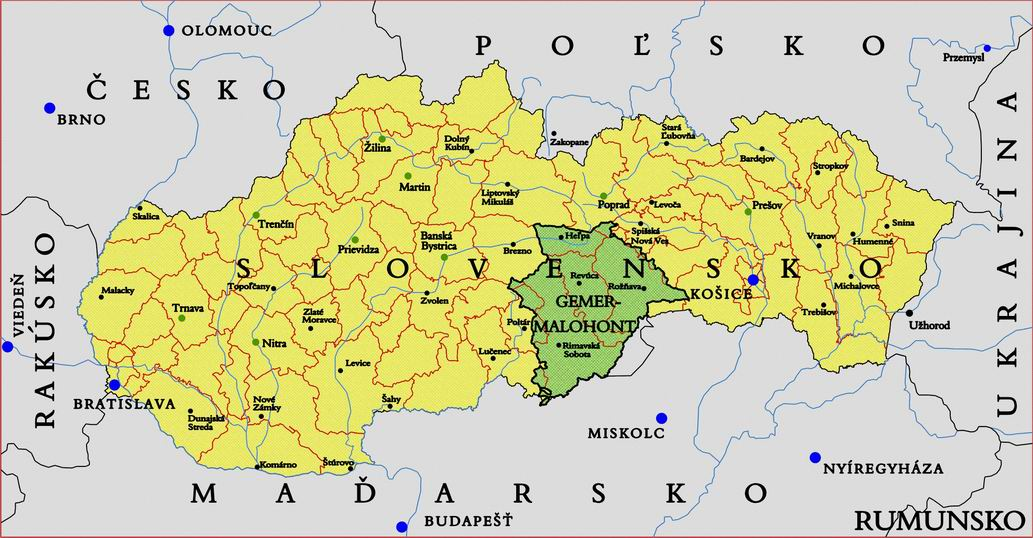
Former county of Gömör-Kishont superimposed on map of contemporary Slovakia.

Around 1910, Gömör-Kishont county shared borders with the counties Zólyom, Liptó, Szepes, Abaúj-Torna, Borsod, Heves and Nógrád. It was situated in the Gömör–Szepesi-érchegység (present-day Slovak Ore Mountains) approximately between the present-day Slovak-Hungarian border, the towns Poltár and Rozsnyó (present-day Rožňava) and the Low Tatras (Hungarian: Alacsony-Tátra, Slovak: Nízke Tatry). The river Sajó flowed through the county. Its area was 4,279 km² around 1910.

== History ==
The county Gömör-Kishont was a combination of the counties Gömör and Kishont formed in 1802. It existed until the end of World War I. Gömör is one of the oldest counties of the Kingdom of Hungary, and was already mentioned in the 11th century. Kishont is the territory approximately between the towns Tiszolc (present-day Tisovec) and Rimaszombat (present-day Rimavská Sobota). Counties of Gömör and Kishont was part of Ottoman Empire between 1541–1595 and 1596–1686.

In the aftermath of World War I, most of Gömör-Kishont county became part of newly formed Czechoslovakia, as recognized by the concerned states in 1920 by the Treaty of Trianon. The area around Putnok became part of the newly formed Hungarian county Borsod-Gömör-Kishont (currently part of Borsod-Abaúj-Zemplén) in 1923. The Czechoslovak part of the county was part of the Slovak Land (Slovenská krajina/zem).

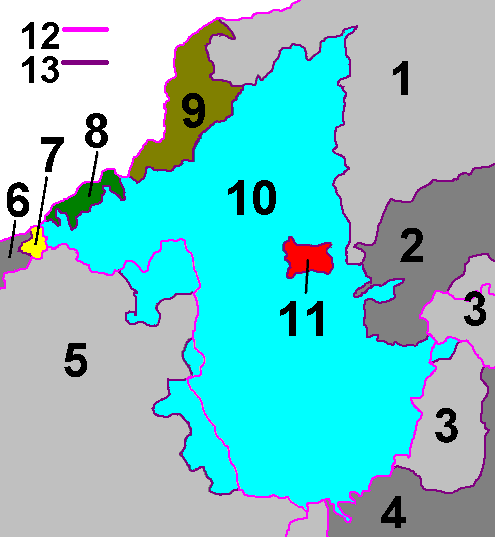
Borsod (10) and Gömör-Kishont (9) counties after the Treaty of Trianon. In 1923, the two counties were merged to form Borsod-Gömör County. (6) Nógrád County (7) territory assigned from Gömör-Kishont County to Nógrád County in 1921. (8) territory assigned from Gömör-Kishont County to Borsod County in 1938. (11) the city of Miskolc (urban county).

Following the provisions of the First Vienna Award, most of the Czechoslovak part became part of Hungary again in November 1938. The Gömör-Kishont county was recreated. The small northernmost part that remained in Slovak hands (a.o. the towns Dobšiná and Revúca) became part of the new Hron county (Pohronská župa). The Trianon borders were restored after World War II and the county was merged into Borsod-Gömör County. Since 1993, when Czechoslovakia was split, Gemer and Malohont have been part of Slovakia, and since 1996 divided between the Košice region and the Banská Bystrica region.

== Demographics ==
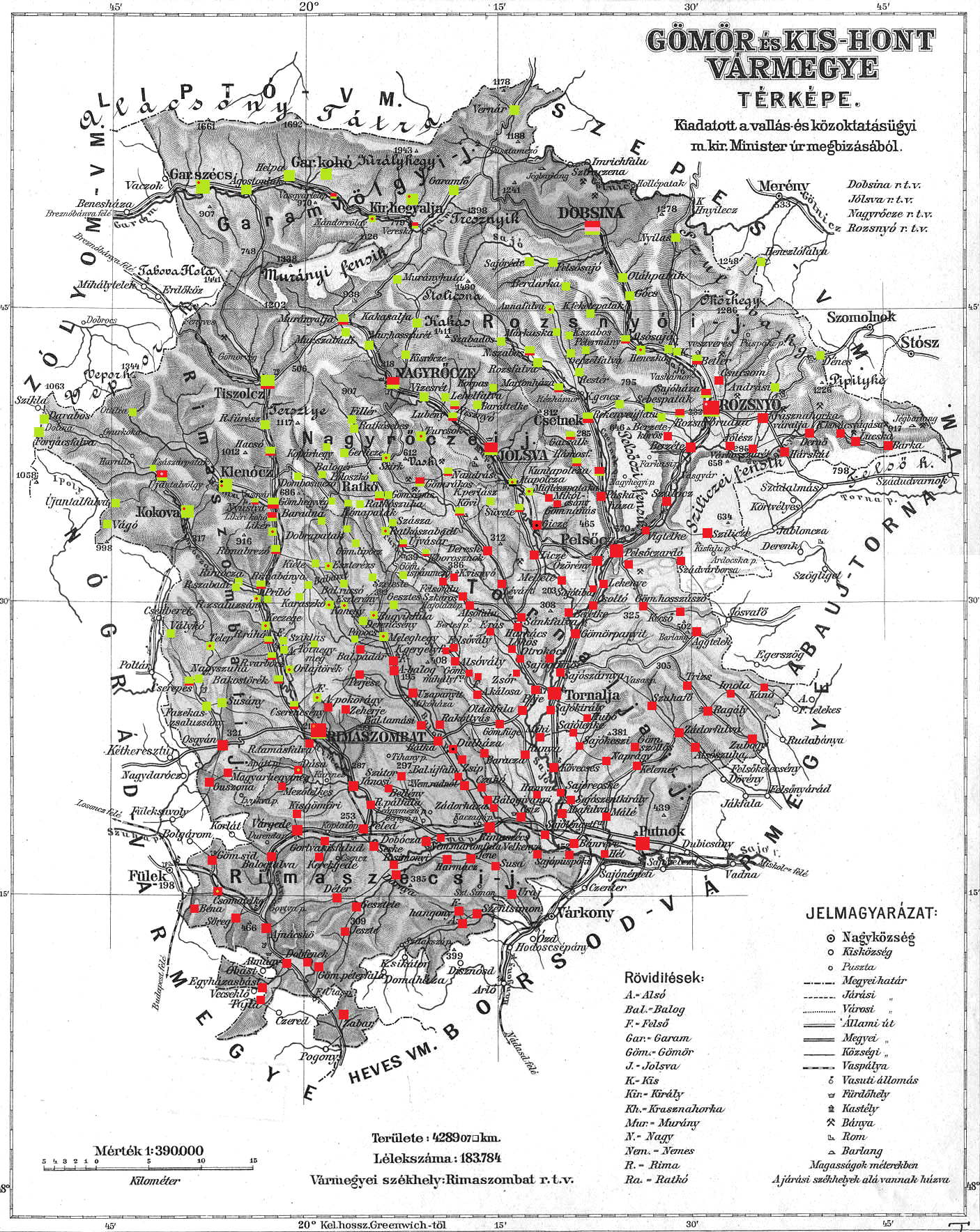
Ethnic map of the county with data of the 1910 census (see the key in the description).

Population by mother tongue (Note: Only linguistic communities > 1% are displayed.)
Census	Total	Hungarian	Slovak	German	Other or unknown
1880	169,064	83,235 (50.95%)	72,432 (44.34%)	5,714 (3.50%)	1,981 (1.21%)
1890	174,810	93,695 (53.60%)	74,731 (42.75%)	4,770 (2.73%)	1,614 (0.92%)
1900	183,784	103,660 (56.40%)	74,517 (40.55%)	4,059 (2.21%)	1,548 (0.84%)
1910	188,098	109,994 (58.48%)	72,232 (38.40%)	2,930 (1.56%)	2,942 (1.56%)

Population by religion (Note: Only religious communities > 1% are displayed.)
Census	Total	Roman Catholic	Lutheran	Calvinist	Jewish	Greek Catholic	Other or unknown
1880	169,064	68,776 (40.68%)	60,138 (35.57%)	32,066 (18.97%)	4,320 (2.56%)	3,662 (2.17%)	102 (0.06%)
1890	174,810	73,197 (41.87%)	59,486 (34.03%)	33,479 (19.15%)	4,572 (2.62%)	4,019 (2.30%)	57 (0.03%)
1900	183,784	79,838 (43.44%)	59,459 (32.35%)	34,707 (18.88%)	5,339 (2.91%)	4,344 (2.36%)	97 (0.05%)
1910	188,098	85,355 (45.38%)	57,744 (30.70%)	34,798 (18.50%)	5,603 (2.98%)	4,410 (2.34%)	188 (0.10%)

== Subdivisions ==
In the early 20th century, the subdivisions of Gömör-Kishont county were:

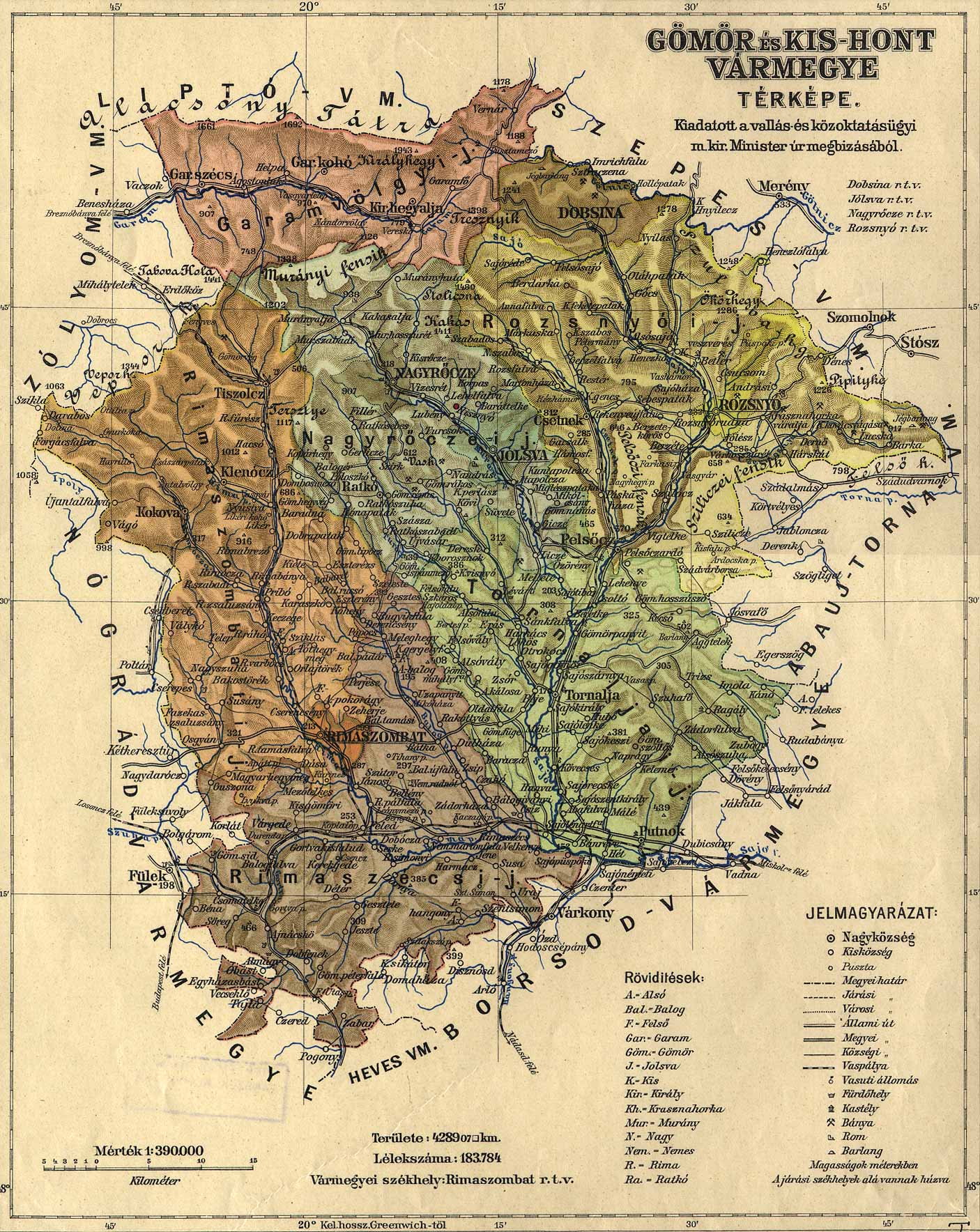

Districts (járás)
District	Capital
Feled	Feled (now Jesenské)
Garamvölgy	Nándorvölgy (now Vaľkovňa)
Nagyrőce	Jolsva (now Jelšava)
Putnok (from 1910)	Putnok
Ratkó (from 1909)	Ratkó (now Ratková)
Rimaszombat	Nyustya (now Hnúšťa)
Rozsnyó	Rozsnyó (now Rožňava)
Tornalja	Tornalja (now Tornaľa)
Urban districts (rendezett tanácsú város)
Dobsina (now Dobšiná)
Jolsva (now Jelšava)
Nagyrőce (now Revúca)
Rimaszombat (now Rimavská Sobota)
Rozsnyó (now Rožňava)

Putnok is now in Hungary; all other named towns are now in Slovakia.

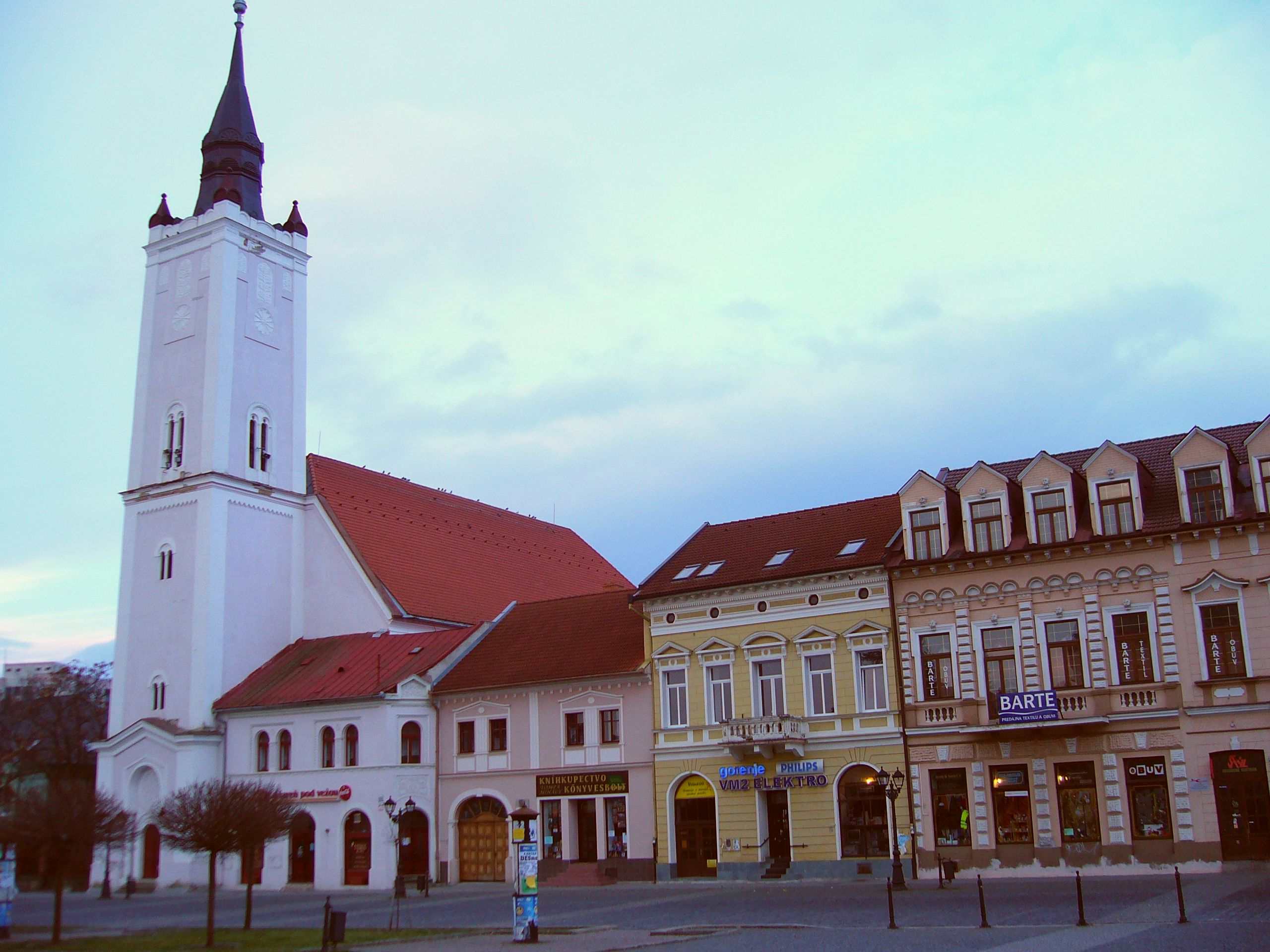
Main Square, Rimavská Sobota
