= Vaľkovňa =

Vaľkovňa Nándorvölgy
- Municipality
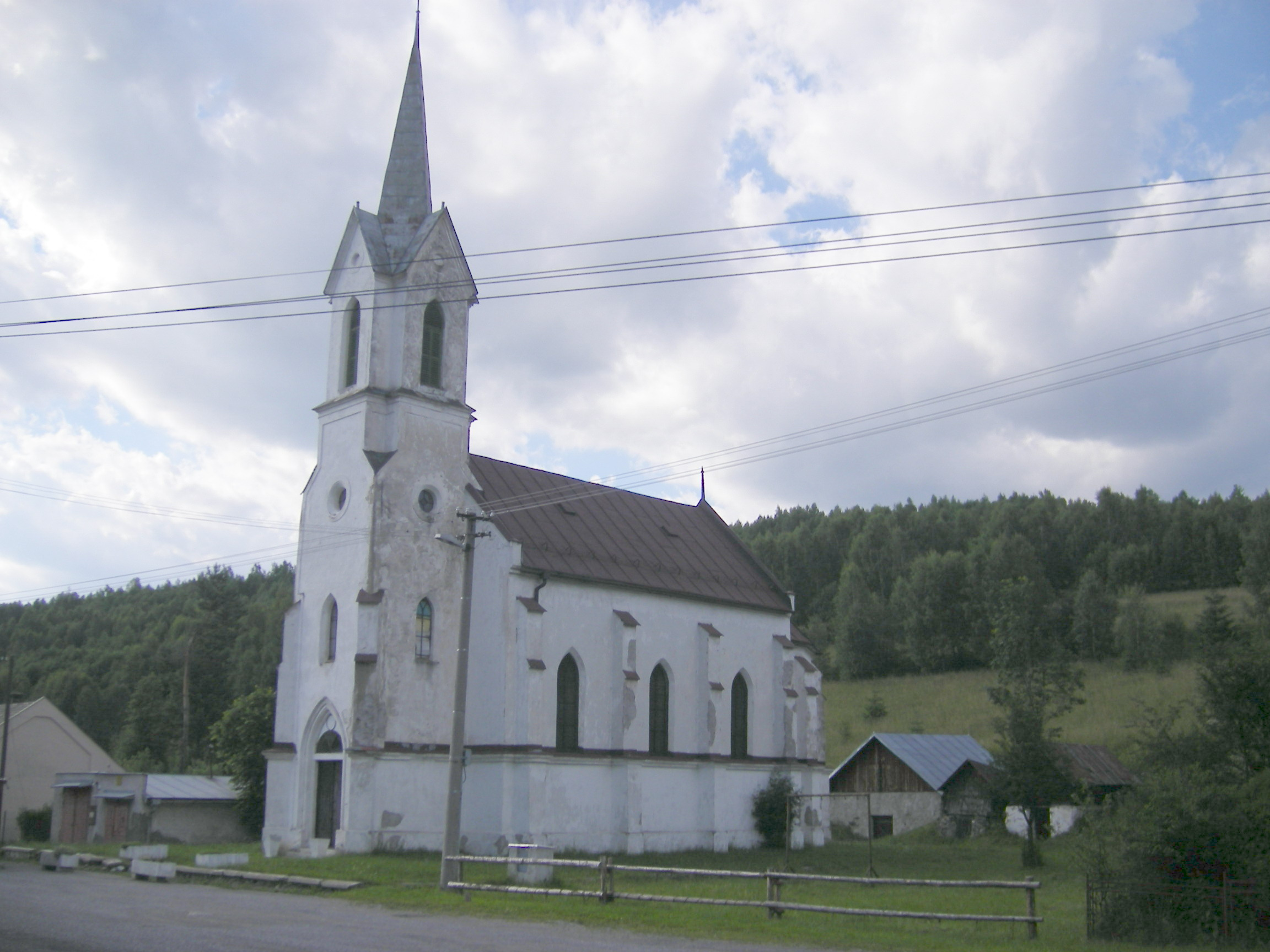
- Lutheran church in Vaľkovňa

- Flag

- Location of Vaľkovňa in the Banská Bystrica Region Location of Vaľkovňa in Slovakia
- Coordinates: 48.83°N 20.07°E
- Country: Slovakia
- Region: Banská Bystrica Region
- District: Brezno District
- First mentioned: 1612

Area
  - Total: 14.86 km^{2} (5.74 sq mi)
- Elevation: 721 m (2,365 ft)

Population (2025)
  - Total: 393
- Time zone: UTC+1 (CET)
  - Summer (DST): UTC+2 (CEST)
- Postal code: 976 69
- Area code: +421 48
- Vehicle registration plate (until 2022): BR
- Website: www.valkovna.sk

Vaľkovňa (Hungarian: Nándorvölgy) is a village and municipality in Brezno District, in the Banská Bystrica Region of central Slovakia.

== Geography ==
The municipality lies at an altitude of 721 metres (2,365 ft) and covers an area of 14.86 km^{2} (5.74 sq mi) (2025).

== Population ==
Population statistic (10 years)
Year	1995	2005	2015	2025
Count	279	342	422	393
Difference		+22.58%	+23.39%	−6.87%

Population statistic
Year	2024	2025
Count	402	393
Difference		−2.23%

It has a population of 393 people (31 December 2025).

=== Ethnicity ===
Census 2021 (1+ %)
Ethnicity	Number	Fraction
Slovak	391	93.54%
Romani	243	58.13%
Not found out	25	5.98%
Total	418	

In year 2021 was 418 people by ethnicity 391 as Slovak, 243 as Romani, 25 as Not found out, 3 as Czech and 1 as Rusyn.

Note on population: The difference values of population numbers in the table "Population statistic" and in the sections "Ethnicity" & "Religion" is caused by the use of various statistical methods.

=== Religion ===
Census 2021 (1+ %)
Religion	Number	Fraction
Roman Catholic Church	289	69.14%
Greek Catholic Church	55	13.16%
None	34	8.13%
Not found out	24	5.74%
Evangelical Church	11	2.63%
Total	418	

In year 2021 was 418 people by religion 289 from Roman Catholic Church, 55 from Greek Catholic Church, 34 from None, 24 from Not found out, 11 from Evangelical Church, 3 from Christian Congregations in Slovakia, 1 from Eastern Orthodox Church and 1 from Paganism and natural spirituality.
