= Lom nad Rimavicou =

Lom nad Rimavicou Forgácsfalva
- Municipality
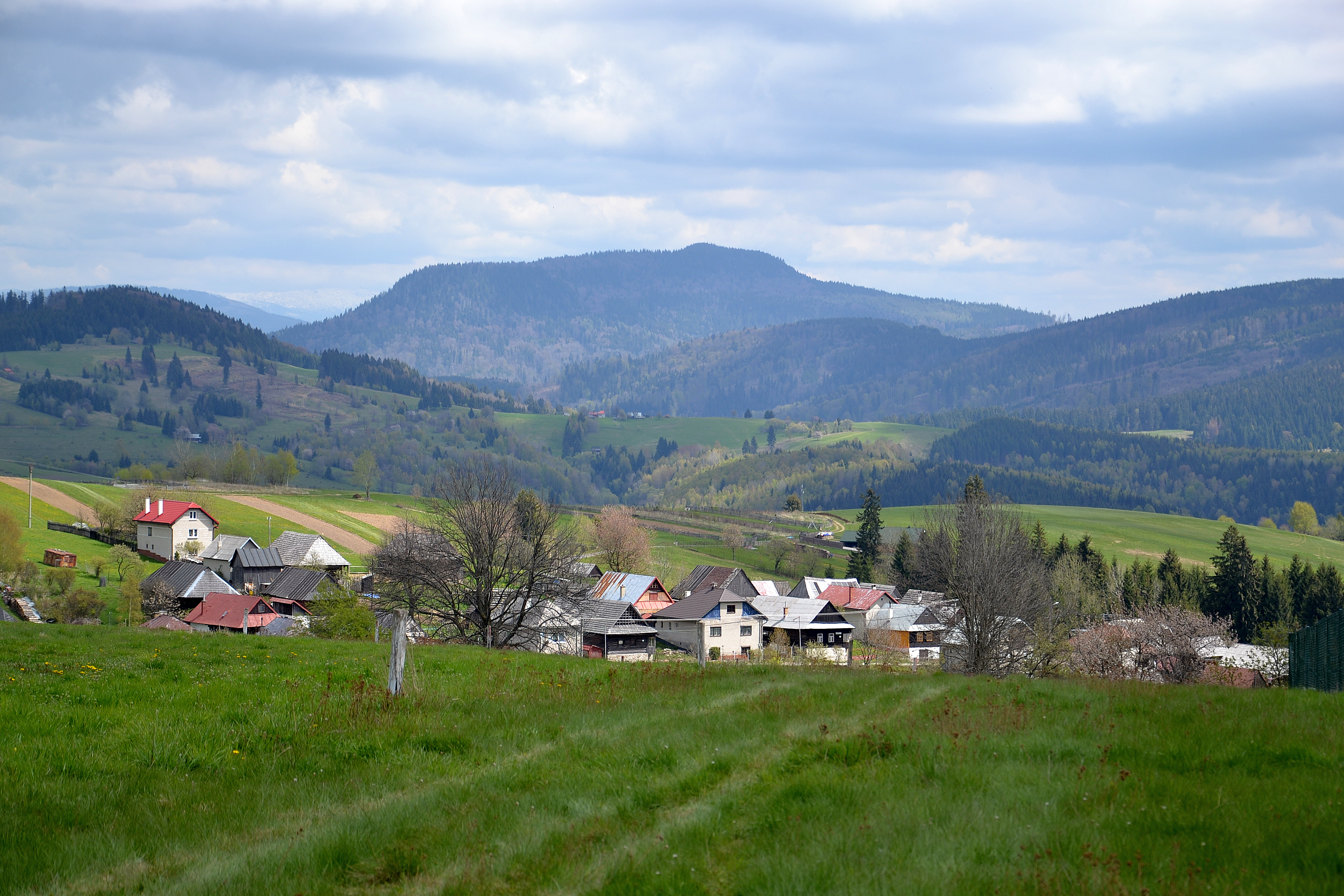

- Flag

- Location of Lom nad Rimavicou in the Banská Bystrica Region Location of Lom nad Rimavicou in Slovakia
- Coordinates: 48.65°N 19.63°E
- Country: Slovakia
- Region: Banská Bystrica Region
- District: Brezno District
- First mentioned: 1799

Area
  - Total: 17.40 km^{2} (6.72 sq mi)
- Elevation: 938 m (3,077 ft)

Population (2025)
  - Total: 213
- Time zone: UTC+1 (CET)
  - Summer (DST): UTC+2 (CEST)
- Postal code: 976 53
- Area code: +421 48
- Vehicle registration plate (until 2022): BR
- Website: www.obeclomnadrimavicou.sk

Lom nad Rimavicou (Hungarian: Forgácsfalva) is a village and municipality in Brezno District, in the Banská Bystrica Region of central Slovakia. The approximate latitude is 48.65 and longitude is 19.65. It is one of the highest located villages in Slovakia. The village was originally settled by Gorals. Neighbouring ski areal starts to attract the tourists.

== Geography ==
The municipality lies at an altitude of 938 metres (3,077 ft) and covers an area of 17.40 km^{2} (6.72 sq mi) (2025).

== Population ==
Population statistic (10 years)
Year	1995	2005	2015	2025
Count	346	308	277	213
Difference		−10.98%	−10.06%	−23.10%

Population statistic
Year	2024	2025
Count	217	213
Difference		−1.84%

It has a population of 213 people (31 December 2025).

=== Ethnicity ===
Census 2021 (1+ %)
Ethnicity	Number	Fraction
Slovak	227	99.56%
Total	228	

In year 2021 was 228 people by ethnicity 227 as Slovak, 1 as Not found out and 1 as Croatian.

Note on population: The difference values of population numbers in the table "Population statistic" and in the sections "Ethnicity" & "Religion" is caused by the use of various statistical methods.

=== Religion ===
Census 2021 (1+ %)
Religion	Number	Fraction
Roman Catholic Church	206	90.35%
None	13	5.7%
Not found out	5	2.19%
Total	228	

In year 2021 was 228 people by religion 206 from Roman Catholic Church, 13 from None, 5 from Not found out, 2 from Evangelical Church, 1 from Other and 1 from Greek Catholic Church.
