= Drábsko =

Drábsko Darabos
- Municipality
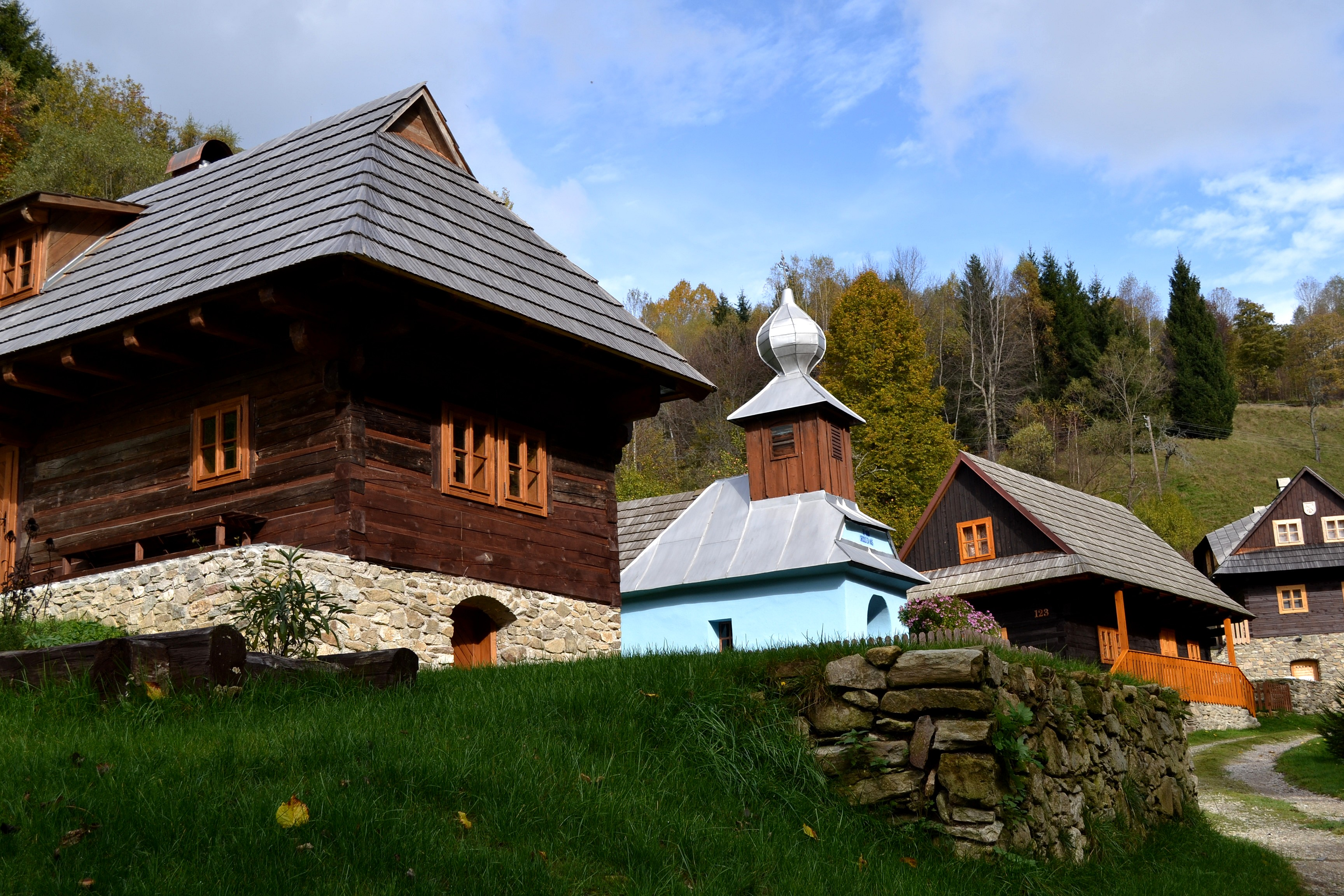

- Flag

- Location of Drábsko in the Banská Bystrica Region Location of Drábsko in Slovakia
- Coordinates: 48.65°N 19.65°E
- Country: Slovakia
- Region: Banská Bystrica Region
- District: Brezno District
- First mentioned: 1810

Area
  - Total: 4.76 km^{2} (1.84 sq mi)
- Elevation: 916 m (3,005 ft)

Population (2025)
  - Total: 152
- Time zone: UTC+1 (CET)
  - Summer (DST): UTC+2 (CEST)
- Postal code: 976 53
- Area code: +421 48
- Vehicle registration plate (until 2022): BR
- Website: drabsko.webnode.sk

Drábsko (Hungarian: Darabos) is a village and municipality in Brezno District, in the Banská Bystrica Region of central Slovakia.

== Geography ==
The municipality lies at an altitude of 916 metres (3,005 ft) and covers an area of 4.76 km^{2} (1.84 sq mi) (2025).

== History ==
Set in the highland plateau, it was founded in 1810 after an extensive forest calamity in this area. Count Forgách, the owner of the forests, brought the first group of loggers from Orava region. Soon came the shepherds, and later on the glassmakers from regions of Kysuce and Moravian Wallachia. The central village has been extended into further parts forming numerous dispersed communities, called lazy in Slovak, among them Kysuca (originally called Otilia after the daughter of Count Forgách) and Sedmák. Glass foundries in the area disappeared after World War I. Since then, the locals provided forest labour, some dedicated to not very profitable agriculture and the local crafts: manufacture of wooden shingles, weaving cloth and cloth rugs. After World War II people started to commute to work in the nearest towns of Podbrezová and Utekáč and the village began to rapidly shrink in number. The Kysuca community was depopulated by authorities in the 1980s, and its wooden folk architecture has been preserved. The area attracts seasonal holiday cottagers and tourists.

== Population ==
Population statistic (10 years)
Year	1995	2005	2015	2025
Count	263	239	210	152
Difference		−9.12%	−12.13%	−27.61%

Population statistic
Year	2024	2025
Count	156	152
Difference		−2.56%

It has a population of 152 people (31 December 2025).

=== Ethnicity ===
Census 2021 (1+%)
Ethnicity	Number	Fraction
Slovak	175	99.43%
Total	176	

In year 2021 was 176 people by ethnicity 175 as Slovak, 1 as Polish, 1 as Not found out and 1 as Other.

Note on population: The difference values of population numbers in the table "Population statistic" and in the sections "Ethnicity" & "Religion" is caused by the use of various statistical methods.

=== Religion ===
Census 2021 (1+%)
Religion	Number	Fraction
Roman Catholic Church	132	75%
None	37	21.02%
Not found out	4	2.27%
Total	176	

In year 2021 was 176 people by religion 132 from Roman Catholic Church, 37 from None, 4 from Not found out, 1 from Other and not ascertained christian church, 1 from Greek Catholic Church and 1 from Evangelical Church.

== Genealogical resources ==
The records for genealogical research are available at the state archive "Statny Archiv in Banska Bystrica, Slovakia".

- Roman Catholic church records (births/marriages/deaths): 1799–1952 (parish B)

== See also ==
- List of municipalities and towns in Slovakia
