= Zlatnica =

Nature reserve in Slovakia

Coordinates: 48.8192°N 20.1044°E

- IUCN category Ia (strict nature reserve)
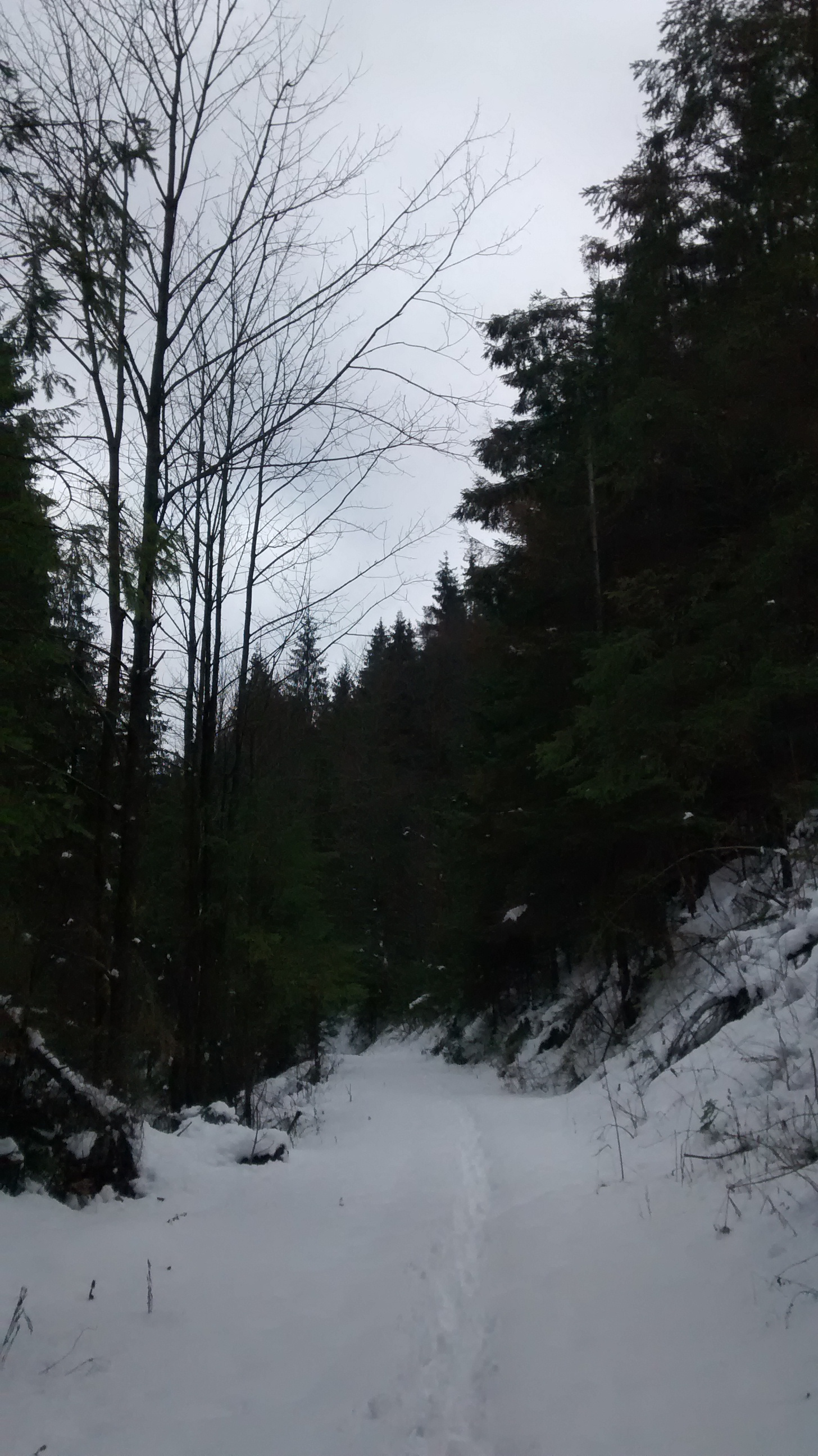
- Zlatnica in winter
- Interactive map of Zlatnica
- Area: 1.54 km^{2} (0.59 sq mi)
- Established: 1993
- Governing body: ŠOP - S- NP Muránska planina

Zlatnica is a valley and nature reserve in the Slovak county of Brezno in the municipality of Šumiac. It covers an area of 154.00 ha and has a protection level of 5 under the slovak law which corresponds with the IUCN level Ib. It is part of the Muránska planina National Park.

== Description ==
Zlatnica lays in one of the best preserved parts of the Muránska planina plateau. In the valley the Sviniarka stream eroded the karst rocks and created cave systems, waterfalls, cyclopean stairs, giant kettles, etc.

== Flora ==
One of the protected plants in the area is the paleoendemic Daphne arbuscula.
