= Havrania Dolina =

Coordinates: 48.8093408°N 20.0746708°E

Havrania dolina
- IUCN category Ia (strict nature reserve)
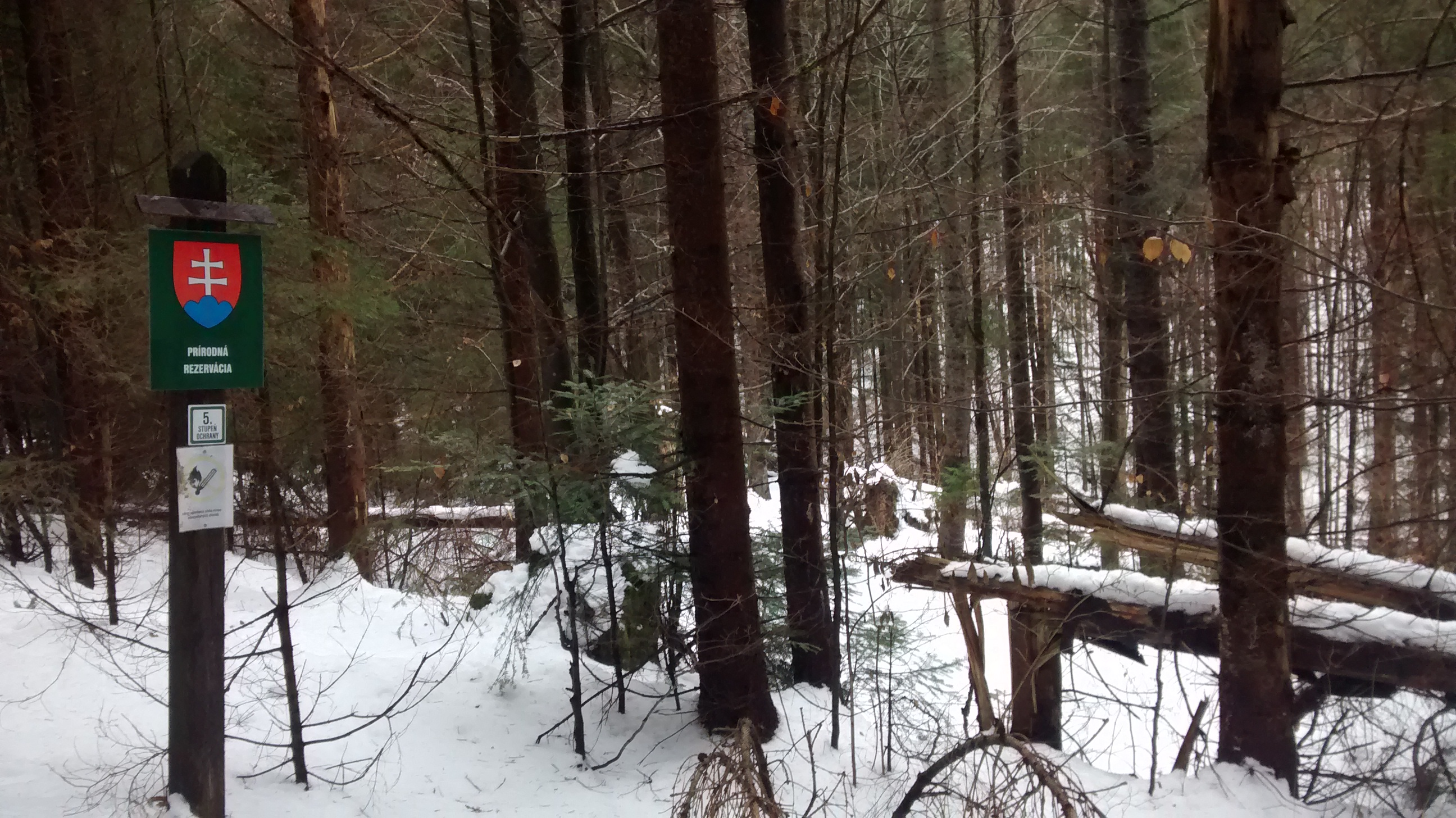
- Havrania dolina
- Interactive map of Havrania dolina
- Area: 2.30 km²
- Established: 1996
- Governing body: ŠOP - S- NP Muránska planina

Havrania dolina is a valley and nature reserve in the Slovak county of Brezno in the municipality of Šumiac. It covers an area of 229.67 ha and has a protection level of 5 under the slovak law.

== Description ==
The nature reserve protects an area of natural forests in a geomorphologically broken area of the Muránska planina plateau. In the area occur a large number of species that are protected by the Slovak law or endangered in the region.

== Flora ==
One of the protected plants in the area is the paleoendemic Daphne arbuscula.
