= Jakub Surovec =

Slovak outlaw

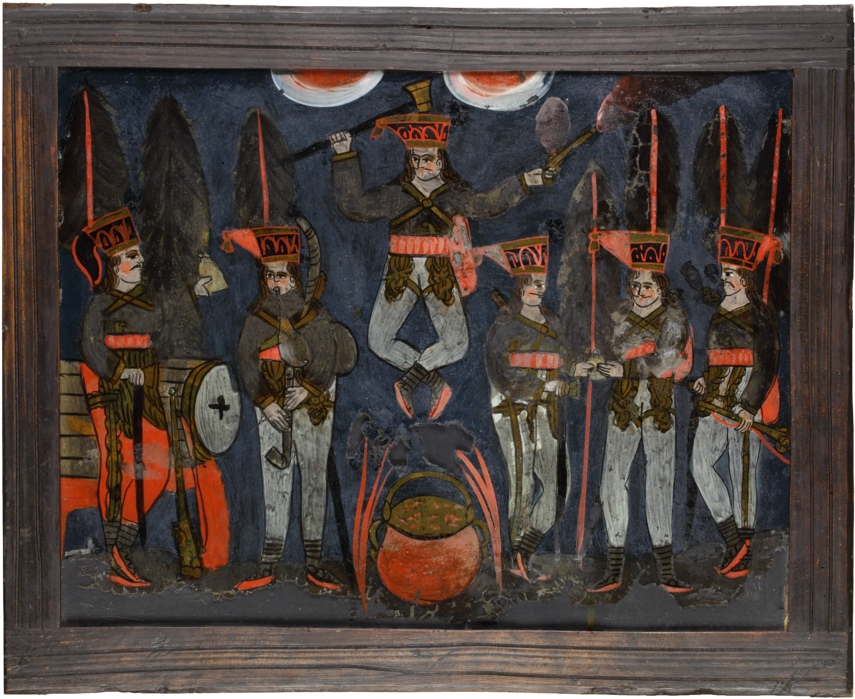
Jakub Surovec (in the middle, jumping), accepted into Jánošík's group – as part of the test, he cuts down the top of one tree with one hand and shoots off the top of another with the other; legendary scene, painting on glass

Jakub Surovec, more commonly known in Poland as Jakub Surowiec (born in 1715 in Tisovec, Kingdom of Hungary; died on 11 October 1740 in Brezno) was a Slovak outlaw, one of the most famous in the country. Along with his group, he engaged in banditry across significant areas of the Central and Inner Western Carpathians. Challenging the feudal system, he gained considerable recognition among the impoverished population. After capturing Surovec, Austrian authorities sentenced him to death. Tales of him made their way into fiction; he is portrayed in a significant number of Polish and Slovak works of art depicting outlaw themes. He is often mistakenly believed to be associated with Juraj Jánošík.

== Early life ==
Jakub Surovec was born in Tisovec as the son of a poor shepherd named Ondrej. Already in childhood, he stood out for his developed sense of justice and sensitivity to social inequalities. In his youth, he worked as a shepherd in Tisovec, near Muráň and in Horehronie. He had reddish hair and dark mustache. He was twice caught stealing sheep, resulting in a punishment of two hundred lashes the first time and a year's imprisonment in Rimavská Sobota the second time.

In 1739, he met Martin, known as "Poliak" due to his Podhale origin, a bandit leader who allowed him to join his group. Thanks to his strength and courage, he distinguished himself enough that when the bandits gathered again the following spring, he became the leader, and Martin Poliak settled for the role of deputy. The formed group consisted of eleven (sometimes erroneously reported as nine or ten) members. In addition to Surovec and Poliak, they were: Pavol Gajdoš, also known as Poliak, Tomaš Greguš from Kubachy in Spiš, who previously worked as a shepherd on Čierny vrch, Juraj Klanica from Krásna Hôrka (today a district of Tvrdošín), Juraj Lukáč from Dúbrava, Ján Oravec, Matej Pijak-Hajduch from Chlebnice, Ondrej Ponický from Poniky, Juraj Turčan, and Michał Tylka, who, like Martin Poliak, came from Dzianisz.

The group assembled in full around 24 June 1740, in a hut near Valaská, from where, between late June and early July, they set off on a banditry journey, following Poliak's advice and heading towards Orava, the Tatras, and Podhale. They robbed, among other places, the church in Valaská, a dyeing workshop in Slanica, a customs office in Mýtna, as well as numerous travelers on the roads and shepherds. They turned back south after a raid near Nowy Targ (depending on the source, it could have been an attack on a nobleman's manor, a wealthy peasant's farm, a tavern, or even looting the town itself, which would have been Surovec's greatest achievement, but it is known that the loot obtained was relatively small). The group's range of activity was exceptionally wide: from Horehronie (the forests between Brezno and Tisovec served as the main base) through Gemer and Novohrad to Liptov, Orava, and the Tatras, all the way to Nowy Targ.

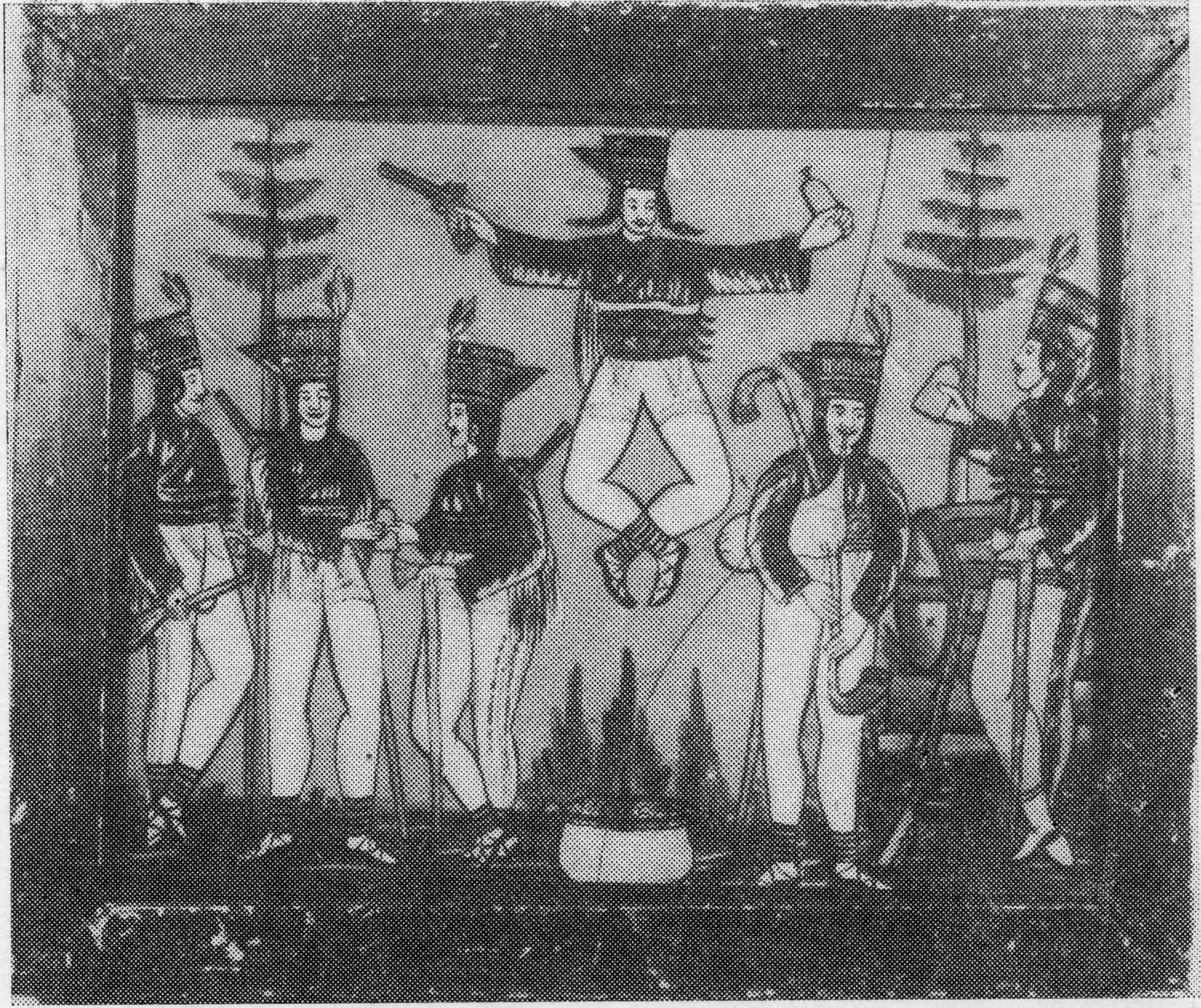
Another representation of a scene analogous to the one above – this motif in Podhale art is known as the "reception of Surovec"

The members of the group mostly came from the poorest layers of society, which is why the fact that Surovec undertook to provide his subordinates with free clothing played a significant role in recruiting them. They all wore bark shoes, which they preserved with lard for greater durability. (Note: Only Surovec bought shoes from a cobbler in Valaska, but soon gifted them to an innkeeper in Tisovec because he had acquired blisters. Also preserved is the information that to him, in turn, an unknown girl from the now defunct lumberjack settlement of Kamov near Černé Hron gave him a shirt, shawl and bib of her own making.) Their weaponry consisted of muskets, hand cannons, pistols, and shepherd's axes, purchased or acquired in battle depending on the specific case. They also treated wounds with puppy fat. The goods obtained were partly used for current needs (food, ammunition, alcohol, clothing, gaining the support of the population), and partly placed in mountain hideouts known to them. Strict discipline and the repeated swearing of the bandit oath played a crucial role in Surovec's organization of bandit life: I swear to the eternal God, the Holy Trinity, and all God's saints that I will never betray, lie to, abandon my companions in good or bad fortune. (Note: Slovak: Prisahám večnému Bohu, svatej trojici i všetkým božím svatym že nikdy svojich tovarišov nezjavim, neoklamem, nezanecham v šťasti a nešťasti...) Matej Pijak-Hajduch testified that he had to renew the oath seven times a year. Surovec focused on attacks on the nobility and wealthy merchants, trying to maintain friendly relations with the rural population, which made it much easier for the group to disperse and escape pursuit; sometimes he is attributed the intention of inciting an anti-feudal uprising.

From August 1740 onwards, the Austrian administration organized a large-scale hunt against Surovec's group. Late in the evening on September 16, during a brawl at a tavern in Pohronská Polhora, the bandit and only one of his companions (Greguš) were surprised by six members of the citizen guard. Both were captured after a fierce fight in which Surovec suffered serious gunshot wounds and blows from an axe. After torture, both bandits were sentenced to death. Surovec's execution took place near Brezno, on a hill called Viselnice, by breaking wheel from above on October 11 (some sources mention beheading and other dates, such as September 20, November 10 or 11). Shortly thereafter, most of the remaining group members were also captured and sentenced.

== Reception ==
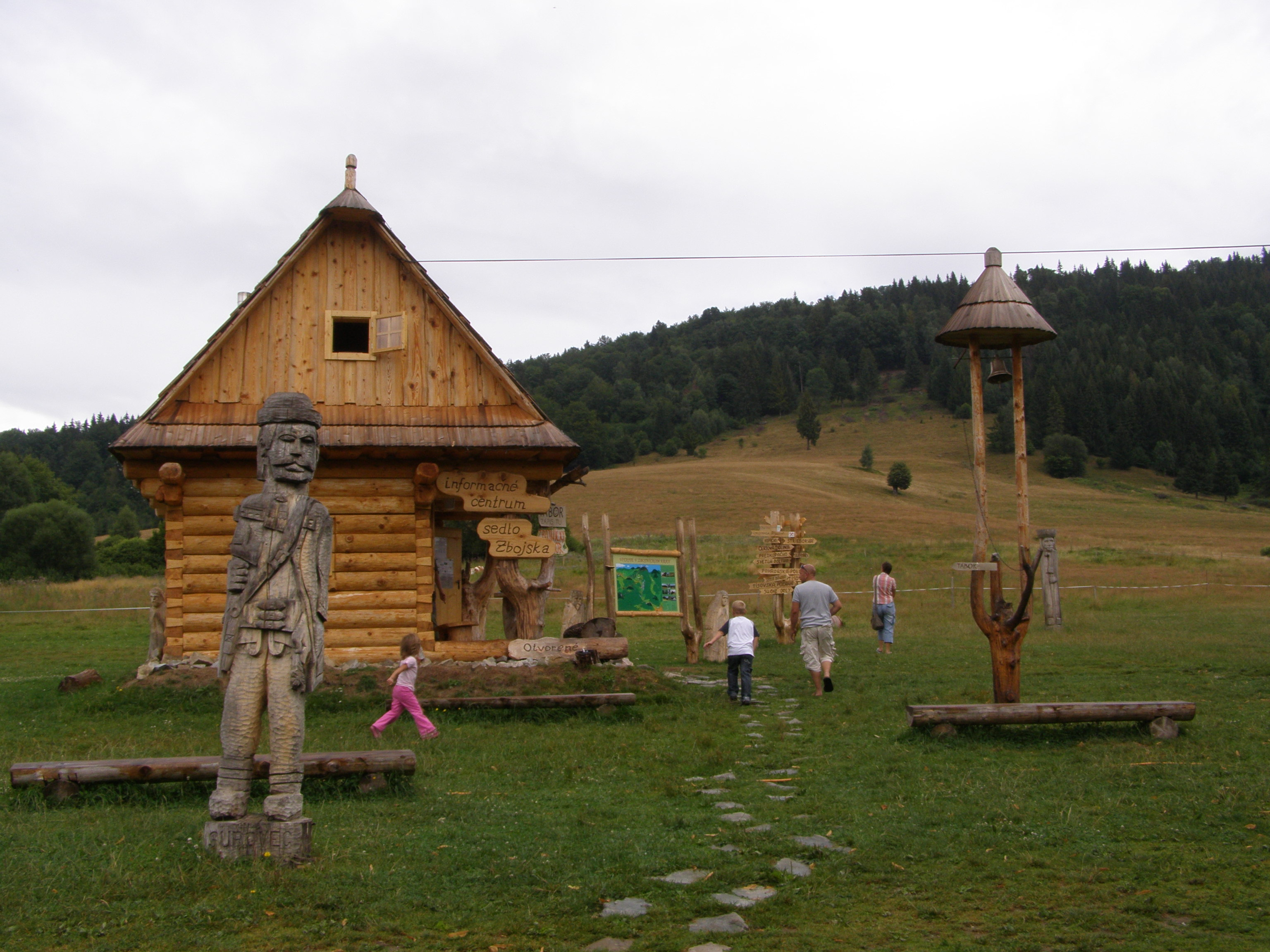
Monument to Jakub Surovec at Zbojská pass

Reception of Jakub Surovec serves as an example of "moderately approving" attitude of the population towards banditry. There is a tradition that after the execution (and shortly before her coronation as Queen of Hungary), Maria Theresa visited the parents of the deceased to offer condolences and listen to stories about him. Legend made him a companion of Juraj Jánošík, which is impossible for chronological reasons (Surovec was born two years after the execution of the most famous Carpathian bandit). However, the description of his acceptance into Jánošík's band became a popular motif in Gorals' folk tales, penetrating into regional reverse glass painting as well. Out of 459 glass paintings preserved in the collections of the Tatra Museum, only thirteen have secular themes, but nine of them repeat the motif called "the reception of Surowiec". Already in 1862, Kazimierz Łapczyński described how a Goral from Szlachtowa presented him with such a painting along with a story.

Bohuslav Tablic published a poem in Czech in 1809 titled Jakub Surowec Loupežnjk Orawský – it was a translation from an anonymous Slovak manuscript (the manuscript has survived; its creation is dated between the fifth and eighth decades of the 18th century) and one of the earliest known examples of banditry themes in literature. This poem, consisting of 348 lines, takes the form of an elegiac self-portrait, with the lyrical subject being imprisoned Surovec. It frequently uses a motif of a bandit betrayed by his lover, which is often employed but contradicts the facts. Jakub Surovec is also mentioned by Kazimierz Przerwa-Tetmajer, albeit superficially and not in accordance with the current state of historical knowledge. (Note: The worst, as they tell, was the death of Jakób Surovec, who owned his own handmade rifle with two barrels and one trigger in the middle (something akin to Konewka's blunderbuss from "Pan Tadeusz"), as he was impaled on a stake.) However, there is also a folk song criticizing him for gluttony, (Note: Surowiec, Surowiec, did you sheep devour? Lambs seven hundred, no longer in the bower.) and the word surowiec began to be used in a common sense of "thief, bandit, rascal".

Today, the name of Jakub Surovec was given to an educational trail in the Muránska planina National Park, and on the Zbojská pass (as of 2019), an old small-leaved lime tree still grows, under which – according to legend – the bandit often rested; the nearby mountain hut gladly uses this story for advertising.
