= Meandre Hrona =

Nature reserve in Slovakia

Coordinates: 48.826461°N 20.1550369°E

- IUCN category IV (habitat/species management area)
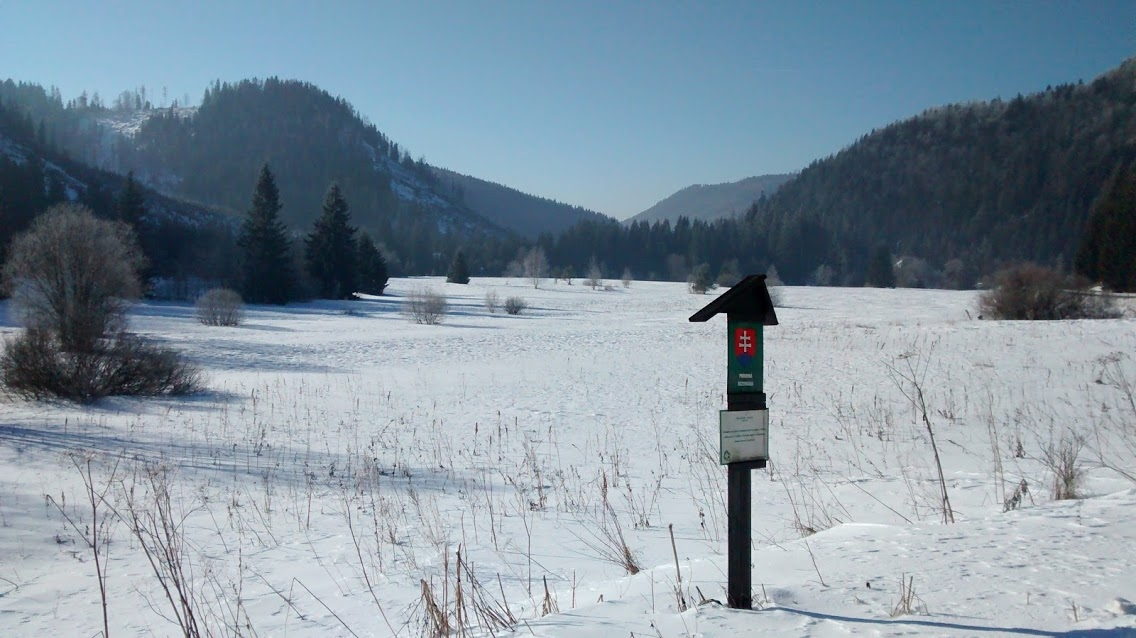
- Meandre Hrona in winter
- Interactive map of Meandre Hrona
- Area: 1.04 km²
- Established: 1980

Meandre Hrona is a nature reserve in the Slovak municipalities of Telgárt and Šumiac in the Brezno District. The nature reserve covers an area of 104 ha of the upper Hron river between the Telgárt and Červená skala railway stations. It has a protection level of 4 under the Slovak nature protection system. The nature reserve is located in the protective border around the Low Tatras National Park.

== Description ==
The nature reserve was established in 1980 to protect the fluvial geomorphological forms of extensively used floodplain meadows and peatbog plant community in the upper Hron river valley. Meandre Hrona is a unique system of meanders on the upper reaches of the river Hron. In combination with waterlogged meadows it provides a habitat for rare and protected plant species. The area is of great importance for Slovakia as the majority of such sites have been drained, turned into agricultural land and thus destroyed. The reserve is located at an altitude between 815m and 860m above sea level. To the west the nature reserve is bordered by the state road 66, to the north by the access road to the Telgárt train station and to the east by the railway between Červená skala and Margecany.

== Flora ==
Depending on the concentration of calcium carbonate in the water; different plant species can be found on different locations in the nature reserve. Plants growing in the Meandre Hrona nature reserve include: Primula farinosa, Pinguicula vulgaris, Valeriana dioica, Salix rosmarinifolia, Carex canescens, Carex echinata, Carex nigra and Viola palustris.

== Recreation ==
There are no hiking paths leading through the nature reserve. The reserve can be observed from the state road 66 on which a small resting area is located which provides a view over the Meandre Hrona nature reserve.
