= National Park Podunajsko =

National park in Slovakia

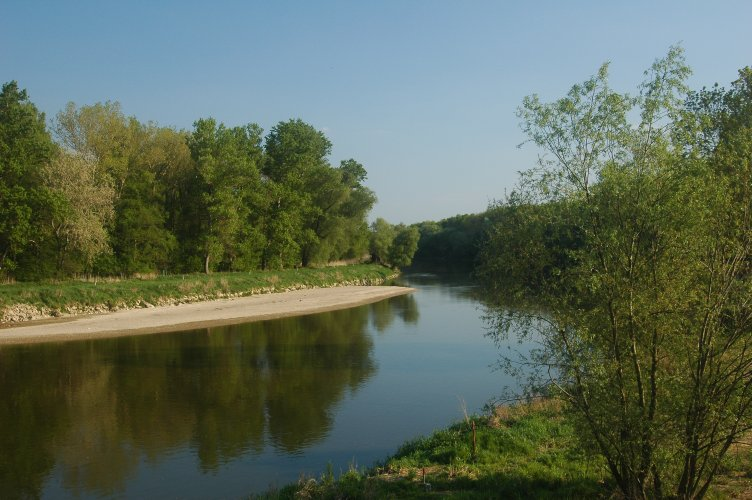
Morava river, on the border between Slovakia and Austria

National Park Podunajsko (Slovak: Národný park Podunajsko) was a planned national park in Slovakia, intended to be the tenth national park in the country. First proposed in 1986, the park was to be situated in South Western Slovakia along the borders with Austria and Hungary. Plans were shelved in 2024 after Minister of the Environment Tomáš Taraba stated there was no need for new parks.

== See also ==
- List of national parks of Slovakia
