= Cakov =

Village and municipality in Slovakia

Cakov Cakó
- Municipality
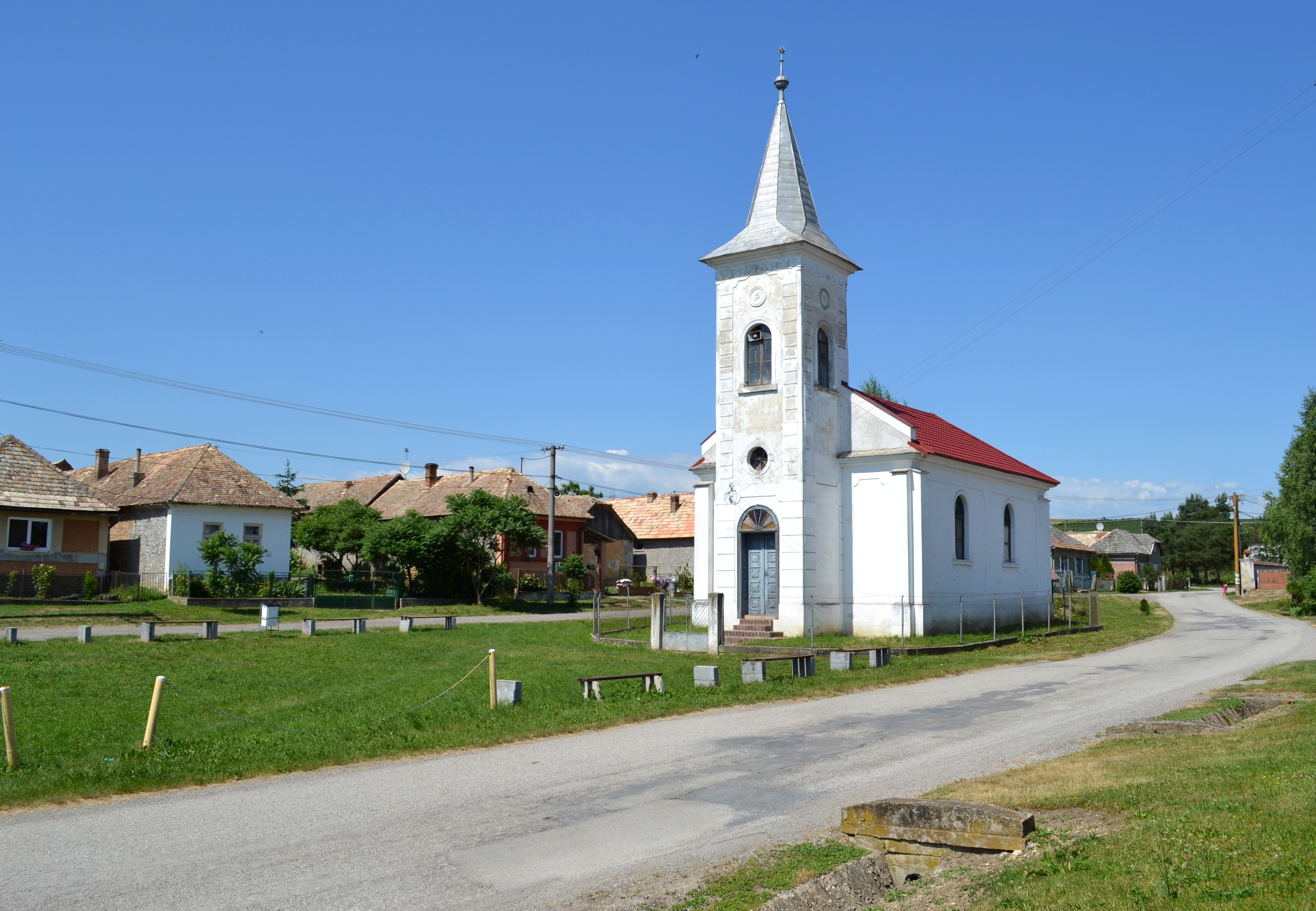

- Flag

- Location of Cakov in the Banská Bystrica Region Location of Cakov in Slovakia
- Coordinates: 48.34°N 20.23°E
- Country: Slovakia
- Region: Banská Bystrica Region
- District: Rimavská Sobota District
- First mentioned: 1395

Area
  - Total: 4.29 km^{2} (1.66 sq mi)
- Elevation: 176 m (577 ft)

Population (2025)
  - Total: 373
- Time zone: UTC+1 (CET)
  - Summer (DST): UTC+2 (CEST)
- Postal code: 980 42
- Area code: +421 47
- Vehicle registration plate (until 2022): RS
- Website: cakov.sk

Cakov (Hungarian: Cakó) is a village and municipality in the Rimavská Sobota District of the Banská Bystrica Region of southern Slovakia.

== History ==
The village arose in the 13th century. It was first mentioned in 1395 (Chakofalua) when it belonged to the Széchy family. From the 17th century it was the property of Muráň. In 1576 and 1583 it was pillaged by the Turks. From 1938 to 1944 it belonged to Hungary under the First Vienna Award.

== Geography ==
The municipality lies at an altitude of 176 metres (577 ft) and covers an area of 4.29 km^{2} (1.66 sq mi) (2025).

== Population ==
Population statistic (10 years)
Year	1995	2005	2015	2025
Count	221	283	322	373
Difference		+28.05%	+13.78%	+15.83%

Population statistic
Year	2024	2025
Count	363	373
Difference		+2.75%

It has a population of 373 people (31 December 2025).

=== Ethnicity ===
Census 2021 (1+ %)
Ethnicity	Number	Fraction
Hungarian	283	79.27%
Romani	178	49.85%
Slovak	52	14.56%
Not found out	34	9.52%
Other	4	1.12%
Total	357	

In year 2021 was 357 people by ethnicity 283 as Hungarian, 178 as Romani, 52 as Slovak, 34 as Not found out and 4 as Other.

Note on population: The difference values of population numbers in the table "Population statistic" and in the sections "Ethnicity" & "Religion" is caused by the use of various statistical methods.

=== Religion ===
Census 2021 (1+ %)
Religion	Number	Fraction
Roman Catholic Church	203	56.86%
None	77	21.57%
Jehovah's Witnesses	35	9.8%
Calvinist Church	22	6.16%
Not found out	18	5.04%
Total	357	

In year 2021 was 357 people by religion 203 from Roman Catholic Church, 77 from None, 35 from Jehovah's Witnesses, 22 from Calvinist Church, 18 from Not found out, 1 from Greek Catholic Church and 1 from Evangelical Church.

The vast majority of the municipality's population consists of the local Romani community. In 2019, they constituted an estimated 96% of the local population. This is a Hungarian-speaking community, with 93% reporting this language as their mother tongue in the 2021 census.

== Genealogical resources ==
The records for genealogical research are available at the state archive "Statny Archiv in Banska Bystrica, Slovakia"

- Roman Catholic church records (births/marriages/deaths): 1787-1895 (parish B)

== See also ==
- List of municipalities and towns in Slovakia
