= Šarkanica =

National nature reserve in Slovakia

Coordinates: 48.734883°N 19.858510°E

- IUCN category Ia (strict nature reserve)
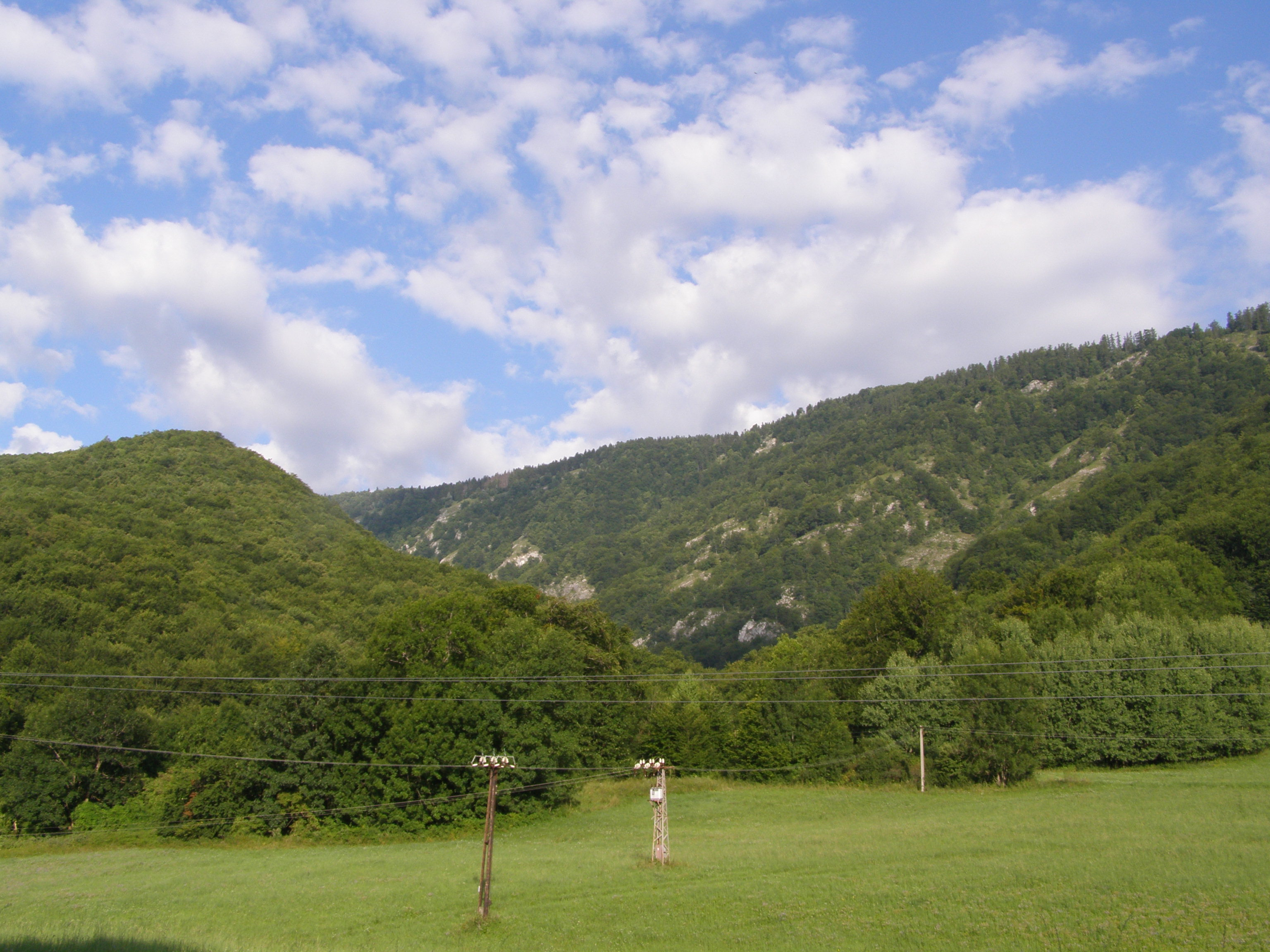
- Šarkanica
- Interactive map of Šarkanica
- Area: 4.54 km^{2} (1.75 sq mi)
- Established: 1984
- Governing body: Muránska planina National Park Administration

Šarkanica is a national nature reserve in the Slovak municipalities of Tisovec and Muráň in the Revúca and Rimavská Sobota District. The nature reserve covers an area of 454 ha. It has a protection level of 5 under the Slovak nature protection system. The nature reserve is part of the Muránska planina National Park.

== Description ==
The Šarkanica national nature reserve protects a geologically and geomorphologically significant part of the Muránska planina plateau with preserved natural rock and forest biotopes. It has a rich representation of protected species of plants and animals.

== Recreation ==
The area is accessible for hikers via the hiking path between Tisovec and Siváková which is indicated with green signs.
