= Muránska Lehota =

- Municipality
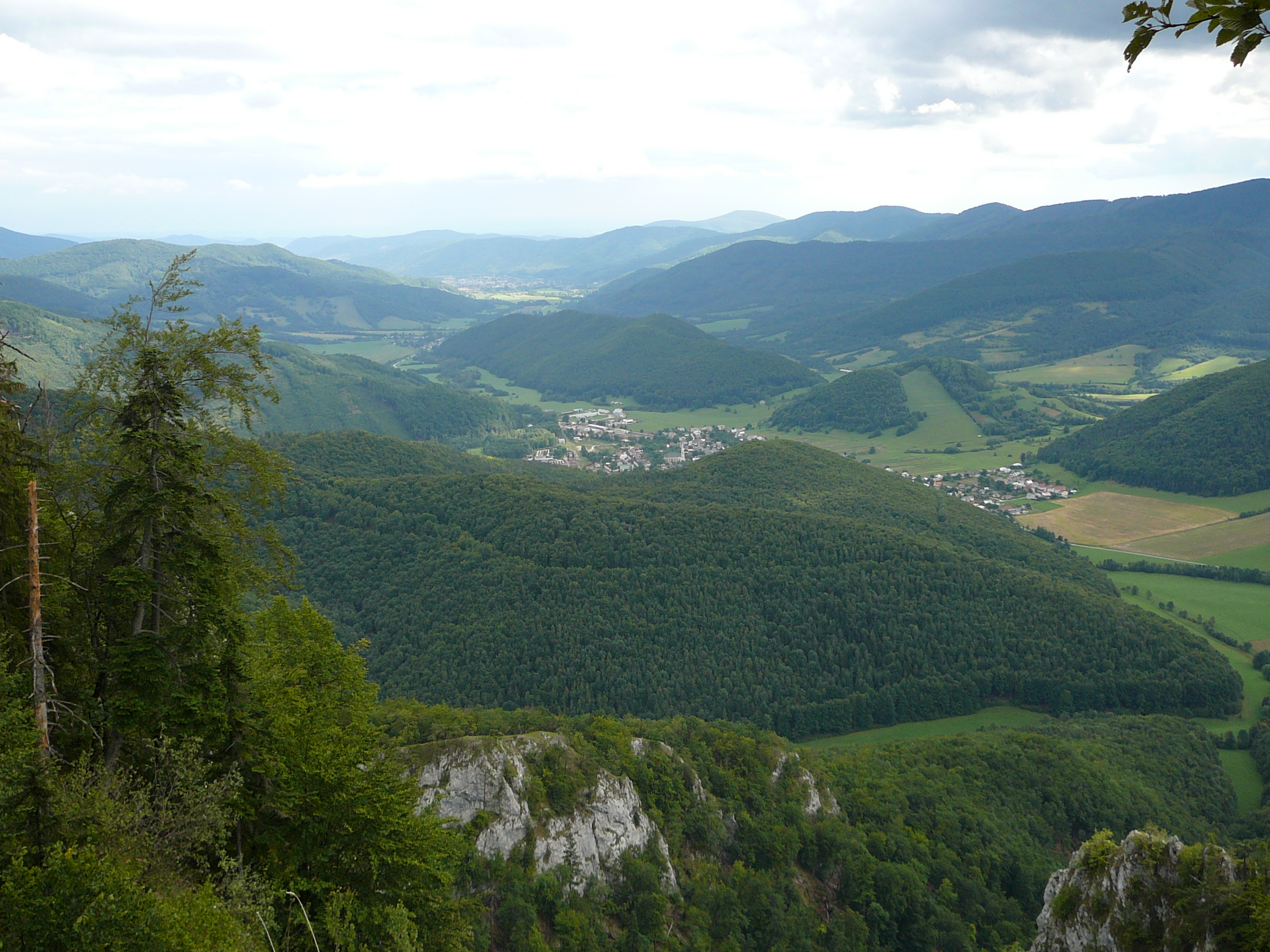

- Flag

- Location of Muránska Lehota in the Banská Bystrica Region Location of Muránska Lehota in Slovakia
- Coordinates: 48.73°N 20.05°E
- Country: Slovakia
- Region: Banská Bystrica Region
- District: Revúca District
- First mentioned: 1453

Government
  - Mayor: Miloslav Marčák (independent)

Area
  - Total: 7.89 km^{2} (3.05 sq mi)
- Elevation: 373 m (1,224 ft)

Population (2025)
  - Total: 203
- Time zone: UTC+1 (CET)
  - Summer (DST): UTC+2 (CEST)
- Postal code: 490 1
- Area code: +421 58
- Website: www.muranskalehota.sk

Muránska Lehota (Hungarian: Murányszabadi) is a village and municipality in Revúca District in the Banská Bystrica Region of Slovakia, located in the southern part of the Slovak Ore Mountains. There are two fishing ponds located on the territory of the village known as the "Upper Pond" and the "Lower Pond".

== Geography ==
The municipality lies at an altitude of 373 metres (1,224 ft) and covers an area of 7.89 km^{2} (3.05 sq mi) (2025).

== History ==
The village was founded in the 15th century. The local population has been active in sheep farming, wood and charcoal production as well as in agriculture. The population grew steadily to about 500 citizens in 19th century and remained stable up until the World War II as the natural population growth had been offset by steady emigration. In 1826, a Roman Catholic church dedicated to the Nativity of Mary was constructed, which contains a bell originally located at the nearby Muráň Castle After the war and forced collectivization of agriculture, the population started to slowly decrease to the 2021 level of about 200 villagers.

== Population ==
Population statistic (10 years)
Year	1995	2005	2015	2025
Count	244	225	205	203
Difference		−7.78%	−8.88%	−0.97%

Population statistic
Year	2024	2025
Count	199	203
Difference		+2.01%

It has a population of 203 people (31 December 2025).

=== Ethnicity ===
Census 2021 (1+ %)
Ethnicity	Number	Fraction
Slovak	195	97.98%
Czech	4	2.01%
Not found out	2	1%
Hungarian	2	1%
Total	199	

In year 2021 was 199 people by ethnicity 195 as Slovak, 4 as Czech, 2 as Not found out, 2 as Hungarian and 1 as French.

Note on population: The difference values of population numbers in the table "Population statistic" and in the sections "Ethnicity" & "Religion" is caused by the use of various statistical methods.

=== Religion ===
Census 2021 (1+ %)
Religion	Number	Fraction
Roman Catholic Church	156	78.39%
None	25	12.56%
Evangelical Church	11	5.53%
Paganism and natural spirituality	3	1.51%
Greek Catholic Church	3	1.51%
Total	199	

In year 2021 was 199 people by religion 156 from Roman Catholic Church, 25 from None, 11 from Evangelical Church, 3 from Paganism and natural spirituality, 3 from Greek Catholic Church and 1 from Christian Congregations in Slovakia.

As of 2023, about 15% of inhabitants are children under 14 and 16% are senior over 65. According to the 2021 census, about 10% of residents have a collage degree. 80% of villagers are Roman Catholics, 5% Protestants and 12% subscribe to no religious belief.

== Transportation ==
The village is connected via a road with a nearby village of Muráň and the small town of Tisovec. There is also a bus line connecting the towns of Tisovec and Revúca, which crosses Muránska Lehota and Muráň. The Muráň village is also reachable in about 30 minutes on foot through a forest trail crossing the Príslop hill. This trail is a part of marked hiking trail no. 0914.

== Image gallery ==
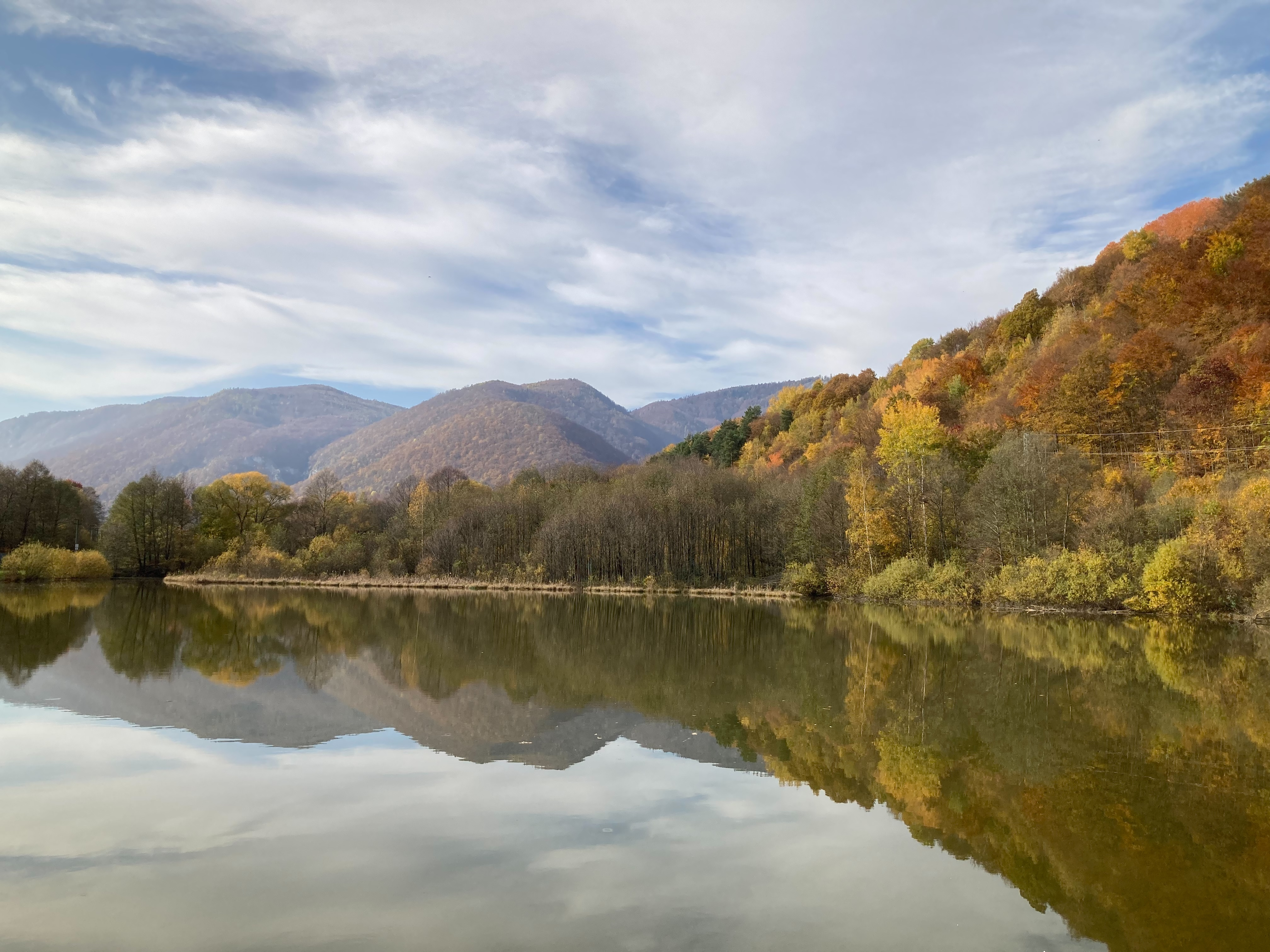
Ponds nearby the village

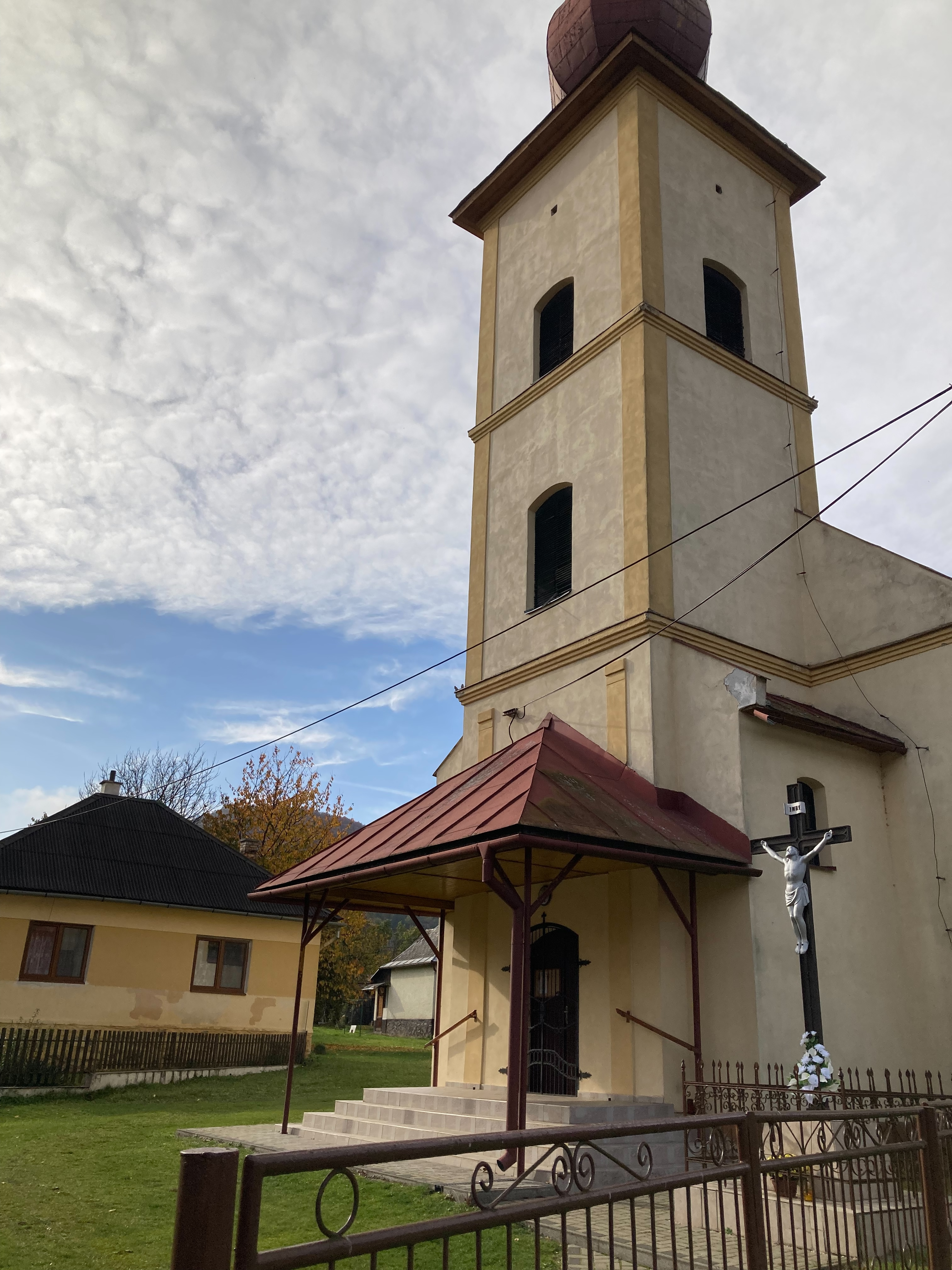
Nativity of Mary church

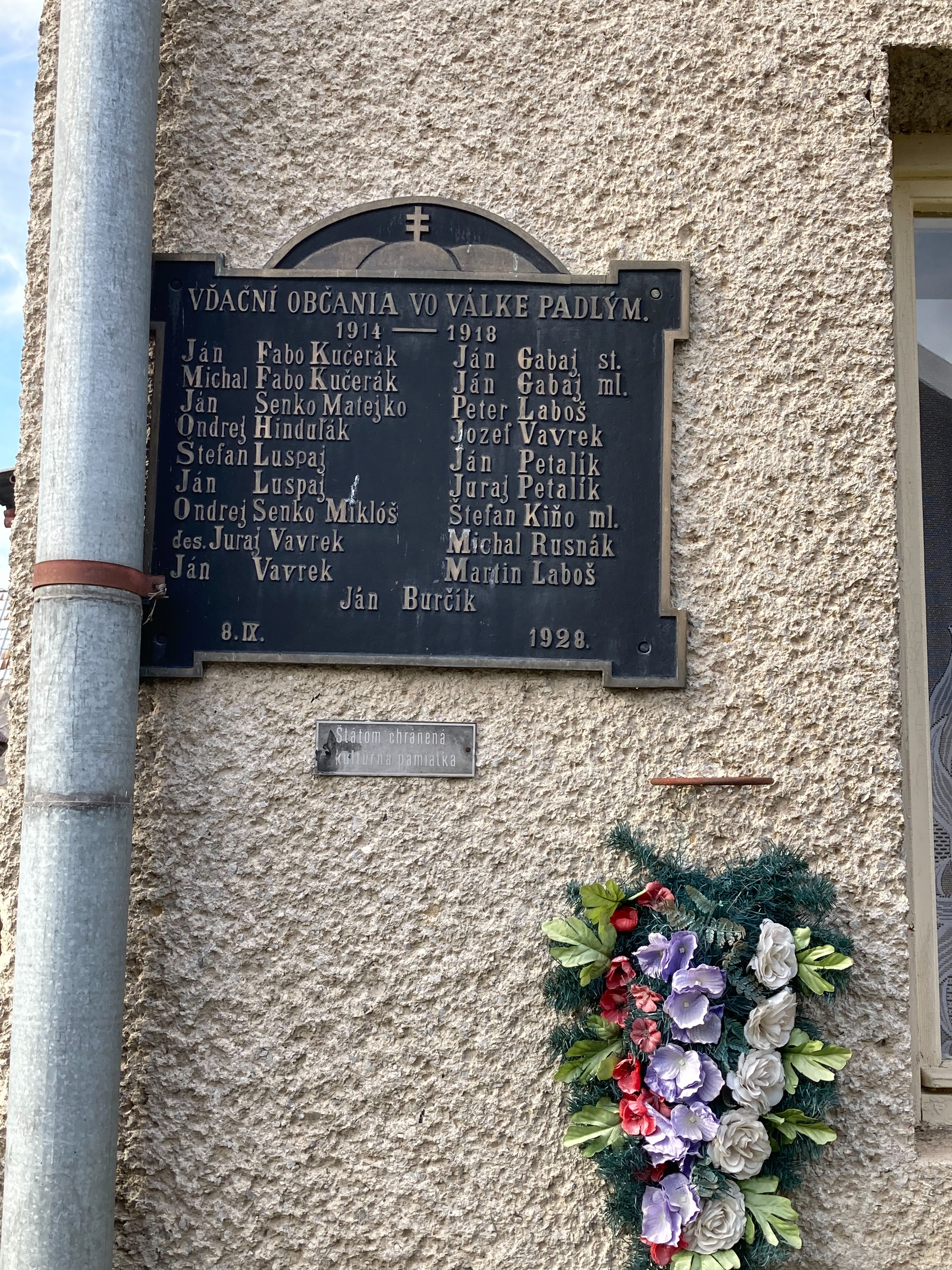
1928 plaque commemorating World War I victims
