= Klára Jarunková =

Slovak writer (1922–2005)

- Born: Klára Chudíková; 28 April 1922; Šumiac, Czechoslovakia
- Died: 11 July 2005 (aged 83); Bratislava, Slovakia
- Education: Comenius University (did not graduate)
- Occupations: Writer, editor
- Writing career
- Language: Slovak
- Years active: 1960–1993
- Notable awards: Pribina Cross (1966); Order of Ľudovít Štúr (2004)

Klára Jarunková (née Chudíková; 28 April 1922 – 11 July 2005) was a Slovak writer predominantly of literature for children and teenagers. She is the most translated Slovak author.

== Biography ==
Klára Jarunková was born on 28 April 1922, in the village of Šumiac. Her parents were postal clerks. After the death of her monther, when Klára was just 8 years old, she was mostly raised by her aunt Františka. Jarunková was educated at the grammar school for girls in Banská Bystrica, where she lived with her aunt. After her graduation she worked as a village teacher in Korytárky. In 1943 she moved to Bratislava where she studied, but never graduated, Slovak language and Philosophy at the Comenius University and worked as a clerk and editor of the Slovak broadcast of the Czechoslovak radio.

From 1954 until her retirement in 1984, Jarunková worked as a part of staff of the satirical magazine Roháč. During this period she was also active as an author. In her works, she typically took the perspective of a child, often a girl in her teens, struggling with transition from infancy to adulthood. Her work, full of youth slang, humor and sarcasm, was met with critical acclaim for offering a refreshing change after a decade of hegemony of "stilted socialist realism".

In 1978 she published Horehronský talizman, an edited memorial of her father, Július Chudík, who became an unlikely part of the retinue of the tsar Ferdinand I of Bulgaria, after saving the monarch's life.

Following her retirement, Jarunková remained active as a writer for about ten years. She died on 11 July 2005 in Bratislava.

== Legacy and awards ==
In 1980, Jarunková was awarded the Merited Artist of Czechoslovakia. Jarunková also received the Pribina Cross, 1st class in 1996 as well as the highest state decoration – the Order of Ľudovít Štúr in 2004. In April 2020 the Slovenská pošta issued a stamp depicting Jarunková.

== Works ==
Her work was primarily focused on literature for children and teenagers, in particular girls. She is the most translated Slovak author with her works being available in 32 languages.

- 1960 – Hrdinský zápisník
- 1961 – Čierna hodinka plná divov a fantázie
- 1962 – Deti slnka
- 1963 – Jediná
- 1963 – Zlatá sieť
- 1964 – O jazýčku, ktorý nechcel hovoriť
- 1967 – Brat mlčanlivého Vlka
- 1968 – Pomstiteľ, novela
- 1972 – Pár krokov po Brazílii
- 1974 – Tulák, novela
- 1974 – O psovi, ktorý mal chlapca
- 1977 – Tiché búrky
- 1978 – O Tomášovi, ktorý sa nebál tmy
- 1978 – Horehronský talizman
- 1978 – Stretnutie s nezvestným
- 1979 – Čierny slnovrat, román z obdobia SNP
- 1979 – Obrázky z ostrova
- 1980 – Kde bolo, tam bolo
- 1983 – O vtáčikovi, ktorý vedel tajomstvo
- 1984 – O dievčatku, ktoré šlo hľadať rozprávku
- 1986 – Rozprávky
- 1989 – Dedko a vlk
- 1993 – Nízka oblačnosť
