= Muránska planina National Park =

Slovak national park

Muránska planina National Park Národný park Muránska planina
- IUCN category II (national park)
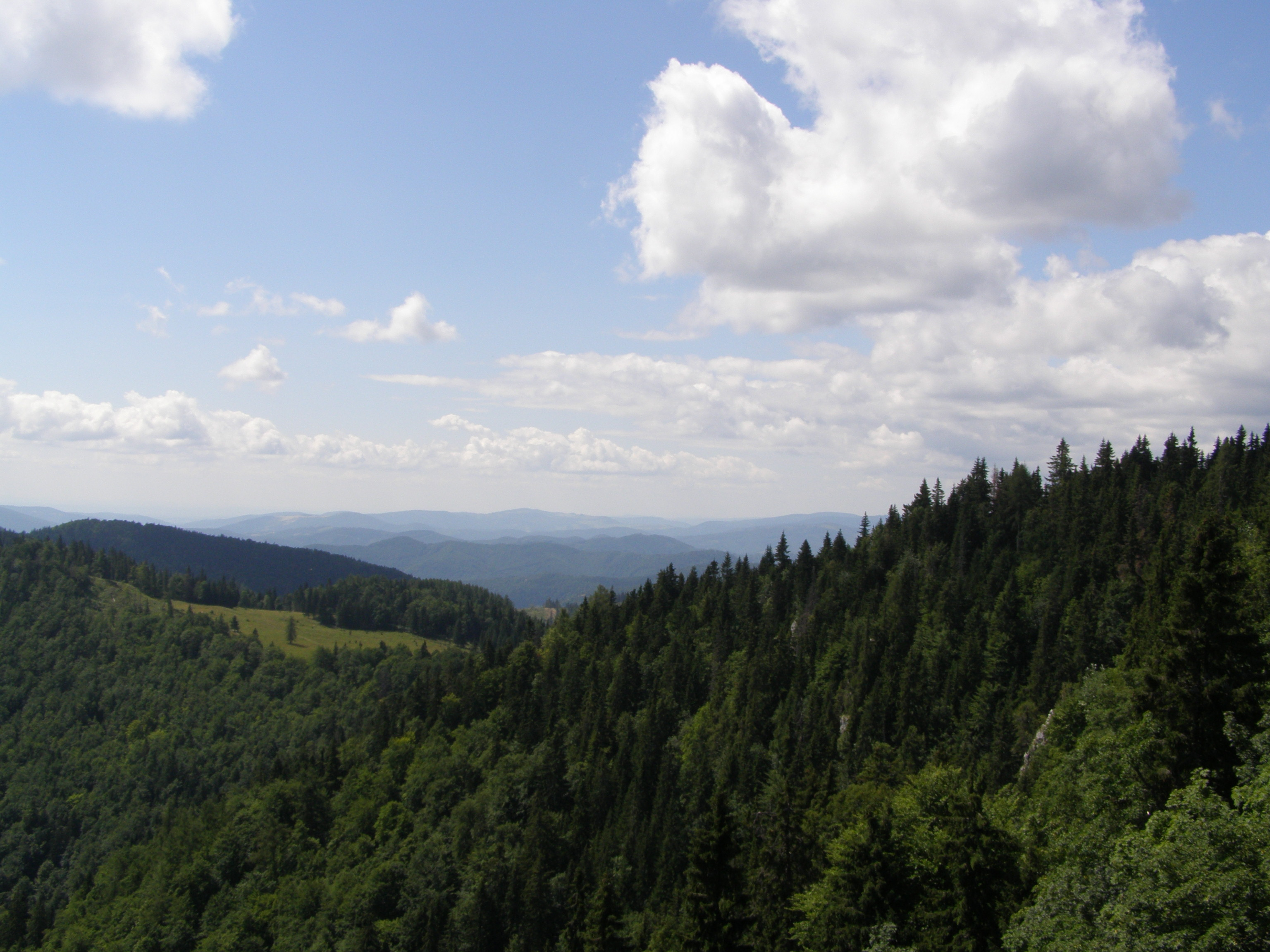
- View from Kľak (1409m AMSL)
- Interactive map of Muránska planina National Park; Národný park Muránska planina
- Location: Central Slovakia
- Nearest city: Tisovec
- Coordinates: 48°47′11″N 20°01′47″E
- Area: 213.18 km^{2} (82.31 sq mi)
- Established: Declared in October 1997 and opened on 27 May 1998
- Governing body: Správa Národného parku Muránska planina (Muránska Planina National Park Administration) in Revúca

Muránska planina National Park (Slovak: Národný park Muránska planina) is one of the youngest national parks in Slovakia. The core area measures 21,318 ha and the protective belt 21,698 ha. It includes 14 smaller protected territories. The headquarters are located in Revúca.

== History ==
The area of the current Muránska Planina National Park was first protected in 1976 as a protected scenic area. This status was changed in October 1997 to that of a national park. The park was officially opened on 27 May 1998.

== Location ==
Muránska Planina national park is situated on the border between Central and Eastern Slovakia far from the country´s borders between the Horehronie region in the north and the Gemer region in the south. The area stretches from the Klenovská Rimava valley in the west to the Javorinka saddle and the village of Červená Skala in the east. The national park is spread out over 3 districts in the Banská Bystrica Region, namely the district of Brezno in the north, Rimavská Sobota in the south and Revúca in the south-east. The cadastral territories of the town of Tisovec and eight villages are located within the borders of the national park and its buffer zone. It protects the area of Muránska planina (Muráň Plateau), which is geologically part of the Slovenské rudohorie mountain range.

== Geology ==
The geology of the Muránska planina dates back to the Mesozoic era. During this time a huge block of dolomite and limestone moved to the location of the current national park and formed a nappe. Because of this phenomenon the core of the national park still consists of a limestone and dolomite plateau with karst formations. Over the course of millions of years water carved deep furrows and valleys that gradually acquired a wild character. Steep rocky ravines are located mainly on the northwestern and southeastern edges of the area. In contrasts, the surface of the plateau itself is relatively flat and is located between 900 m and 1400 m. Because of the well-developed karst, the plateau is dotted with numerous abysses, caves, sinkholes, karrens and springs.

The relief of the Muránska planina national park is very rugged and in many places rocky. The central territory is formed by the massif of the Muránska planina mountains that is part of the Spišsko-gemerský kras. The overall length of the karst landscape from the settlement of Červená Skala (part of Šumiac) to the town of Tisovec is about 25 km.

The lowest situated site in the national park is located close to the village of Muráň at an altitude of 400m AMSL. The highest point is Fabova hoľa at 1,439 m AMSL, however, a higher peak, Stolica at 1,476 m is located in the buffer zone. Stolica is also the highest peak of the Slovak Ore Mountains.

There are more than 150 notable caves, which are inaccessible to the public.

== Flora ==
Flora in the National Park is notable for its biodiversity and species richness and includes 35 endemic and sub-endemic species, for example, Daphne arbuscula. Forests cover about 90% of the area.

== Tourism ==
Tourist attractions include 300 km of marked hiking trails and two educational trails, one of which is named after Jakub Surovec. The best access to the park is through the surrounding villages and settlements, for example Muráň and Závadka nad Hronom. On a rock in the middle of the range stands the Muráň castle.

== Protected areas ==
The national park compromises 10 national nature reserves, 1 national natural monument, 1 natural monument, 7 nature preserves, 1 special protection area and 1 site of community importance:

- National nature preserves:
  - Cigánka
  - Hrdzavá
  - Javorníková
  - Kášter
  - Malá Stožka
  - Poludnica
  - Šarkanica
  - Šiance
  - Veľká Stožka
  - Zlatnica
- National natural monuments:
  - Bobačka
- Natural Monuments:
  - Wesselényiho jaskyňa
- Nature preserves:
  - Čertova dolina
  - Fabova hoľa
  - Havrania dolina
  - Mašianske skalky
  - Mokrá poľana
  - Nad Furmancom
  - Zlatnianske skalky
- Special protection areas:
  - Muránska planina - Stolica
- Sites of community importance:
  - Muránska planina

== See also ==
- Protected areas of Slovakia
