= Zlatnianske skalky =

Nature reserve in Slovakia

Coordinates: 48.8297°N 20.0767°E

- IUCN category Ia (strict nature reserve)
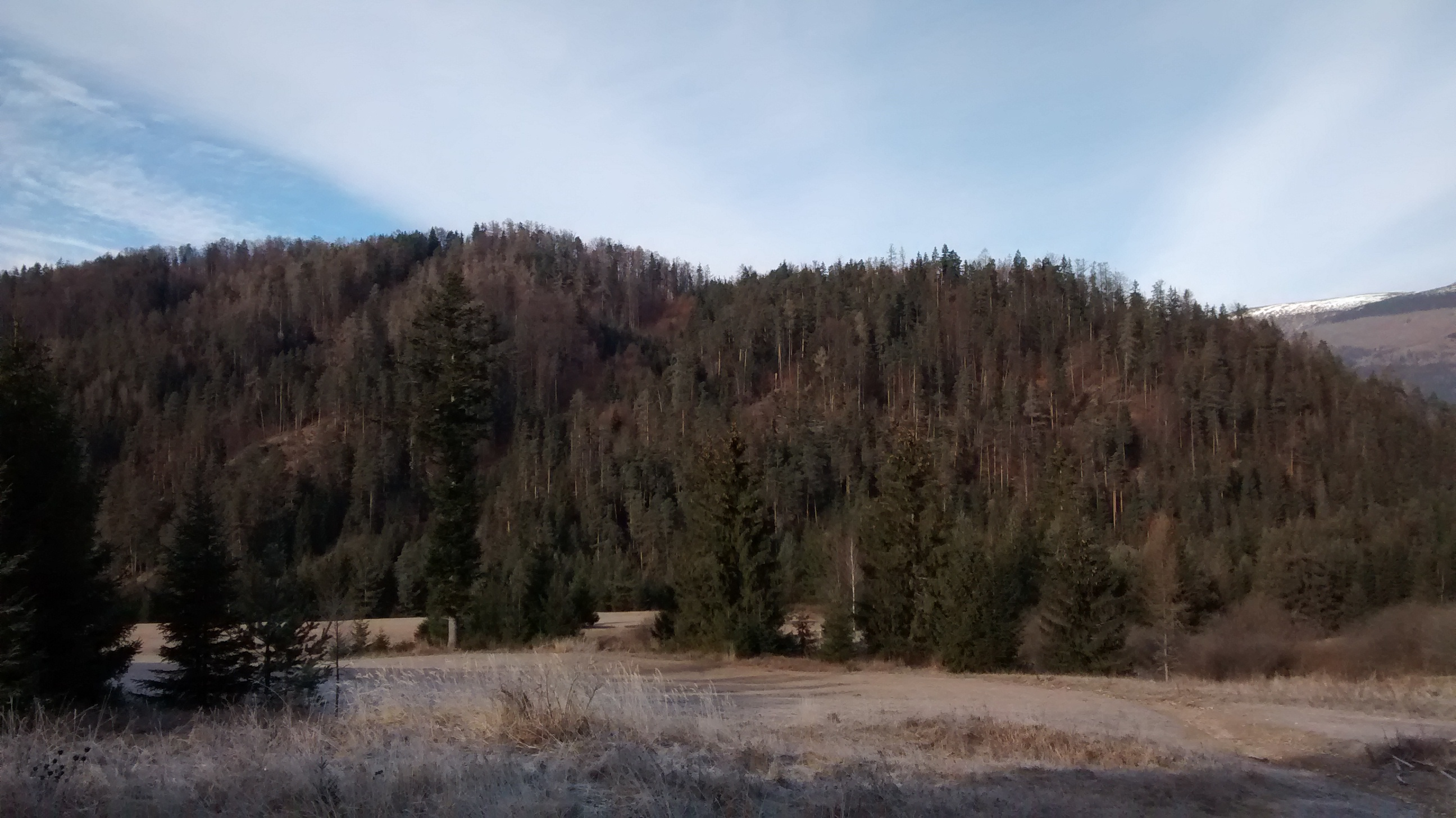
- Zlatnianske skalky
- Interactive map of Zlatnianske skalky
- Area: 0.31 km^{2} (0.12 sq mi)
- Established: 1981
- Governing body: ŠOP - S- NP Muránska planina

Zlatnianske skalky is a nature reserve in the Slovak county of Brezno in the municipality of Vaľkovňa. It covers an area of 30.67 ha and has a protection level of 5 under the slovak law which corresponds with the IUCN level Ib. It is part of the Muránska planina National Park

== Description ==
The Zlatnianske skalky area was declared a protected area in 1981 to protect the preserved natural forest present in this area. The forests show elements of relict character. The purpose of the protection was scientific and educational research. The area hosts some significant and rare flora and fauna.
