= Pohronská Polhora =

Pohronská Polhora Erdőköz
- Municipality
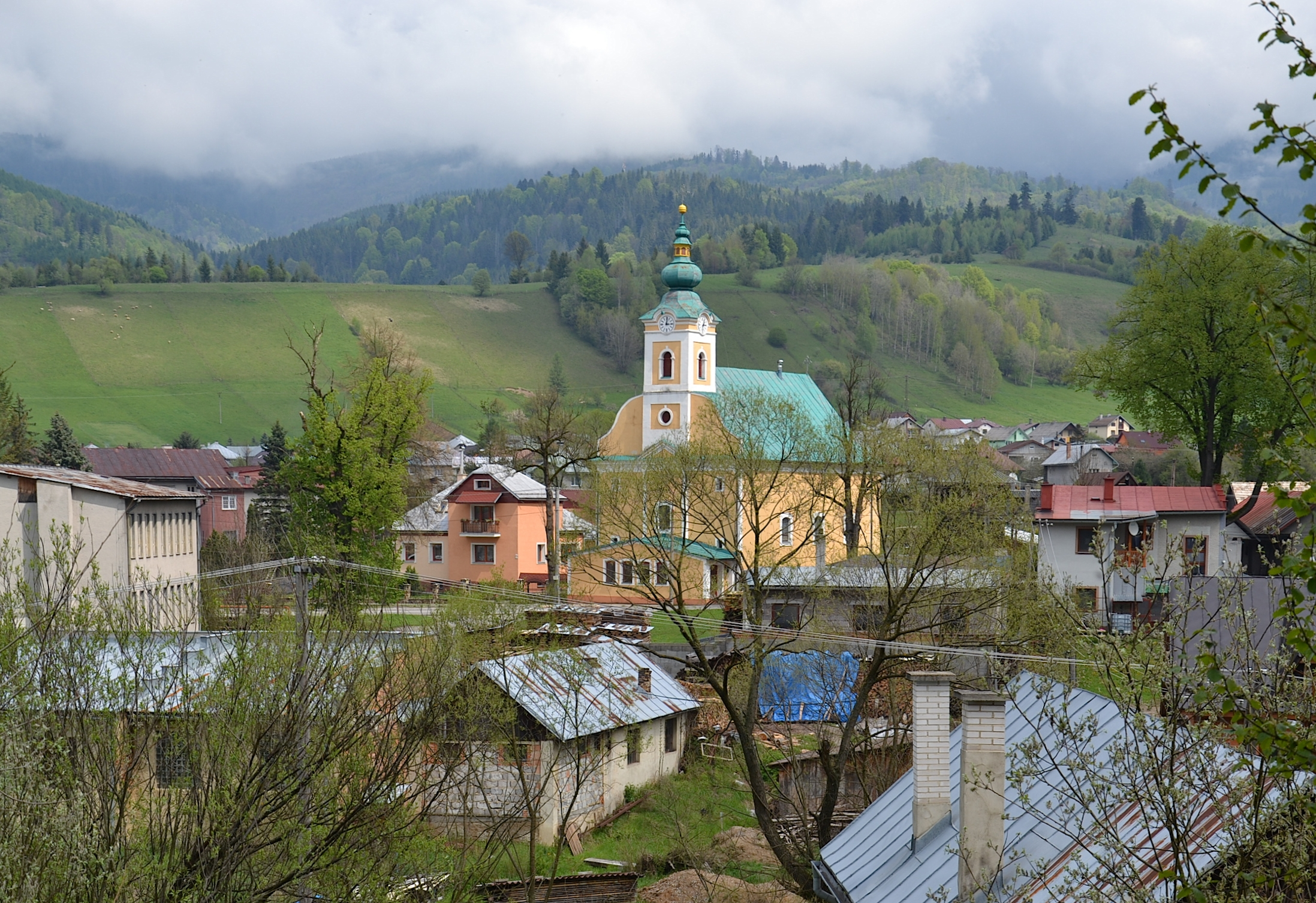
- St. Michael church

- Flag Coat of arms

- Location of Pohronská Polhora in the Banská Bystrica Region Location of Pohronská Polhora in Slovakia
- Coordinates: 48.75°N 19.78°E
- Country: Slovakia
- Region: Banská Bystrica Region
- District: Brezno District
- First mentioned: 1786

Area
  - Total: 35.76 km^{2} (13.81 sq mi)
- Elevation: 619 m (2,031 ft)

Population (2025)
  - Total: 1,671
- Time zone: UTC+1 (CET)
  - Summer (DST): UTC+2 (CEST)
- Postal code: 976 56
- Area code: +421 48
- Vehicle registration plate (until 2022): BR
- Website: www.ppolhora.sk

Pohronská Polhora (Hungarian: Erdőköz) is a village and municipality in Brezno District, in the Banská Bystrica Region of central Slovakia. The first direct mention of the village dates back to 1786, although it is known that the famous outlaw Jakub Surovec was captured there as early as 1740.

== Geography ==
The municipality lies at an altitude of 619 metres (2,031 ft) and covers an area of 35.76 km^{2} (13.81 sq mi) (2025).

== Population ==
Population statistic (10 years)
Year	1995	2005	2015	2025
Count	1587	1690	1753	1671
Difference		+6.49%	+3.72%	−4.67%

Population statistic
Year	2024	2025
Count	1678	1671
Difference		−0.41%

It has a population of 1671 people (31 December 2025).

=== Ethnicity ===
Census 2021 (1+ %)
Ethnicity	Number	Fraction
Slovak	1574	92.58%
Not found out	117	6.88%
Romani	76	4.47%
Total	1700	

In year 2021 was 1700 people by ethnicity 1574 as Slovak, 117 as Not found out, 76 as Romani, 8 as Czech, 2 as Rusyn, 2 as Other, 1 as Ukrainian and 1 as Moravian.

Note on population: The difference values of population numbers in the table "Population statistic" and in the sections "Ethnicity" & "Religion" is caused by the use of various statistical methods.

=== Religion ===
Census 2021 (1+ %)
Religion	Number	Fraction
Roman Catholic Church	1370	80.59%
None	166	9.76%
Not found out	109	6.41%
Evangelical Church	21	1.24%
Total	1700	

In year 2021 was 1700 people by religion 1370 from Roman Catholic Church, 166 from None, 109 from Not found out, 21 from Evangelical Church, 8 from Christian Congregations in Slovakia, 6 from Greek Catholic Church, 4 from Other and not ascertained christian church, 4 from Jehovah's Witnesses, 3 from Calvinist Church, 3 from Ad hoc movements, 2 from Paganism and natural spirituality, 1 from Eastern Orthodox Church, 1 from Other, 1 from United Methodist Church and 1 from Apostolic Church.
