= Čertova dolina =

Nature reserve in Slovakia

Coordinates: 48.734883°N 19.858510°E

- IUCN category Ia (strict nature reserve)
- Interactive map of Čertova dolina
- Area: 0.49 km^{2} (0.19 sq mi)
- Established: 1993
- Governing body: Muránska planina National Park Administration

Čertova dolina is a nature reserve in the Slovak municipality of Tisovec in the Rimavská Sobota District. The nature reserve covers an area of 49 ha. It has a protection level of 5 under the Slovak nature protection system. The nature reserve is part of the Muránska planina National Park.

== Description ==
The Čertova dolina nature reserve protects preserved forest communities with fir, spruce, beech, and other deciduous trees on a limestone substrate. The area has a distinct karst relief including the large Čertová jaskyňa cave system and a gorge section of the Čertova stream with waterfalls.
