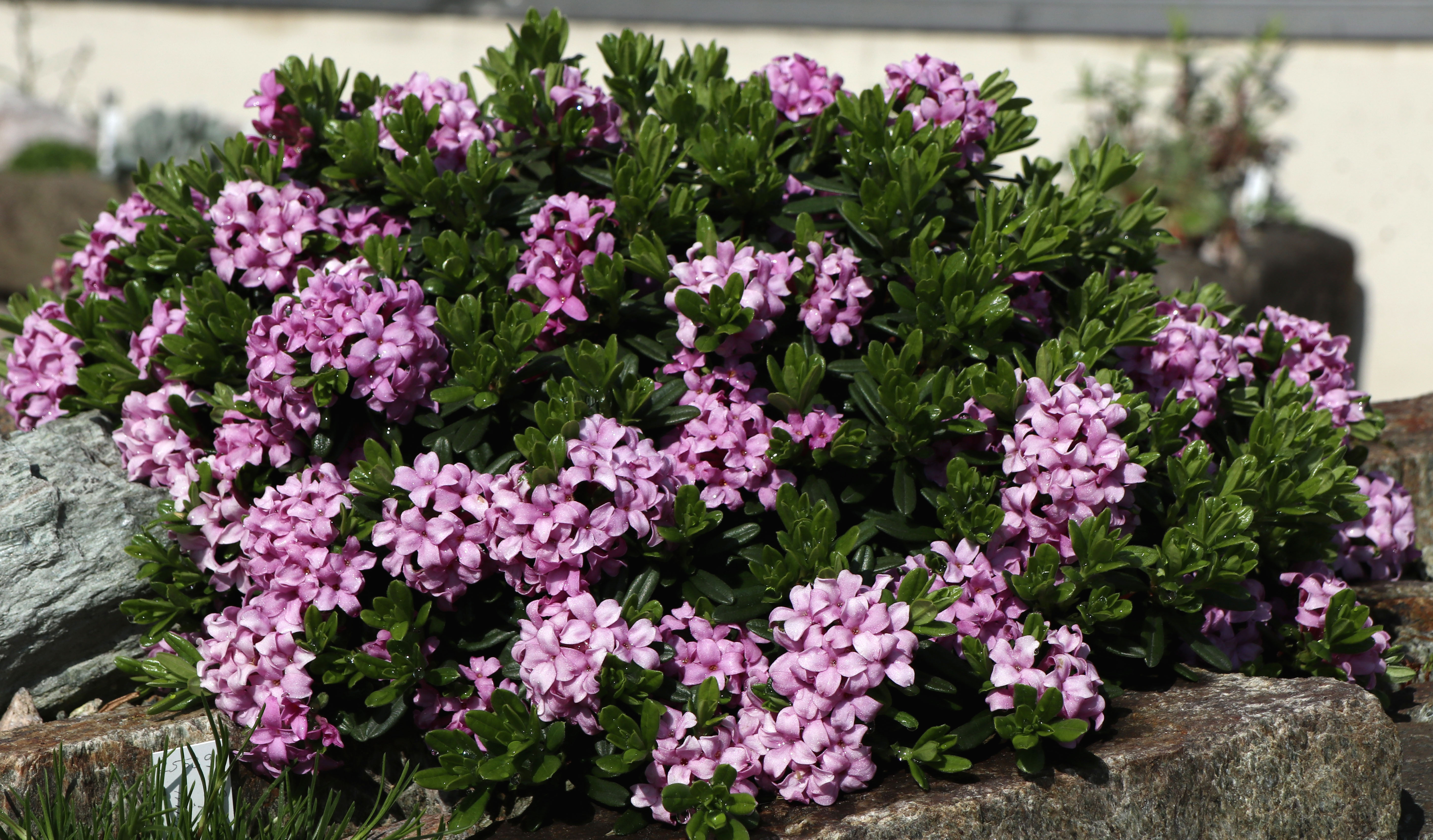

Scientific classification
- Kingdom: Plantae
- Clade: Tracheophytes
- Clade: Angiosperms
- Clade: Eudicots
- Clade: Rosids
- Order: Malvales
- Family: Thymelaeaceae
- Genus: Daphne
- Species: D. arbuscula

Binomial name
- Daphne arbuscula Čelak.

= Daphne arbuscula =

Species of shrub

Daphne arbuscula is a species of flowering plant in the family Thymelaeaceaecae, native only to Slovakia. It is endemic species of Muránska planina National Park. It grows on sunny rocky slopes and rock terraces, mostly on sites with a south or southwest exposure, on limestone bedrock, at an altitude of 800–1300 m. It is a dwarf evergreen shrub growing to 15 cm (5.9 in) tall and broad, with narrow dark green leaves and highly fragrant pink flowers in dense clusters in the spring.

The species is endangered and it is protected by law in Slovakia and also by European law and the Berne Convention on the Conservation of European Wildlife and Natural Habitats. This plant has gained the Royal Horticultural Society's Award of Garden Merit (confirmed 2017).

The Latin specific epithet arbuscula means "like a small tree".

== Habitat, distribution, and ecology ==
Daphne arbuscula is endemic to the Western Carpathians in central Europe, where it is restricted to the Muránska planina Mountains in Slovakia. The species thrives in relict limestone habitats, primarily growing in rock crevices and on steep slopes. It has been documented in approximately 15 microlocalities across the region, each with distinct microclimatic conditions.

The plant grows in poorly developed, skeletal, alkaline soils with pH values ranging from 7.1 to 7.9. These soils occasionally have relatively high humus content (32–54%) in the upper 0.5-cm layer. The species shows considerable adaptation to these challenging rocky environments through its cushion-shaped growth form, extensive deep root system, ability to spread clonally, and leaves with thick upper cuticles.

The distribution of D. arbuscula follows a pattern influenced by aspect and elevation. Sites at lower altitudes (780–950 m above sea level) typically face south or southwest, creating warmer and drier microclimates dominated by thermophilous plant communities. In contrast, higher-altitude sites (940–1275 m) on northern slopes experience colder and wetter conditions, hosting primarily subalpine and dealpine vegetation.

Daphne arbuscula forms complex relationships with soil fungi that are crucial to its survival. Its roots harbour diverse fungal communities, including arbuscular mycorrhizal fungi (AMF), dark septate endophytes (DSE), and various plant pathogens. The composition of these fungal communities differs significantly between warmer and colder microhabitats. Plants in warmer sites show higher colonization by potential fungal pathogens, while those in colder sites have greater colonization by dark septate endophytes, which may help mitigate environmental stress and suppress pathogens. This environmental adaptation may have implications for the species' long-term survival, particularly as climate change progresses, with populations in warmer areas potentially being more vulnerable to fungal diseases.

== Reproduction ==
Daphne arbuscula exhibits reproductive characteristics that may explain its limited distribution. The plant produces one-seeded drupes that display morphological dimorphism, with two distinct fruit types: a large "big-fruit" morphotype] with a thick, fleshy yellow to yellowish-brown mesocarp, and a smaller "small-fruit" morphotype with a reduced mesocarp that ranges from green-reddish to reddish-brown in colour. Seeds from the big-fruit morphotype show significantly higher viability (94%) compared to those from the small-fruit morphotype (58%), though seeds from both types are capable of germination. This fruit dimorphism may represent either different stages of fruit ripening or an evolutionary strategy to enhance survival by varying seed dispersal and germination timing.

The seeds of D. arbuscula show physiological dormancy that requires specific conditions to break for successful germination. The highest germination rates (63%) are achieved after 13 weeks of warm stratification at 15°C followed by 28 weeks of cold stratification at 0°C. The seeds demonstrate better germination at constant temperatures rather than fluctuating ones, and cold stratification appears essential for breaking dormancy. Compared to its more widespread relative Daphne cneorum, D. arbuscula shows lower overall seed viability, which may be a contributing factor to its limited distribution and endemic status. These reproductive characteristics suggest that for conservation purposes, seeds from both fruit morphotypes should be collected to maintain the species' genetic diversity.
