= Mýtna =

Mýtna Vámosfalva
- Municipality
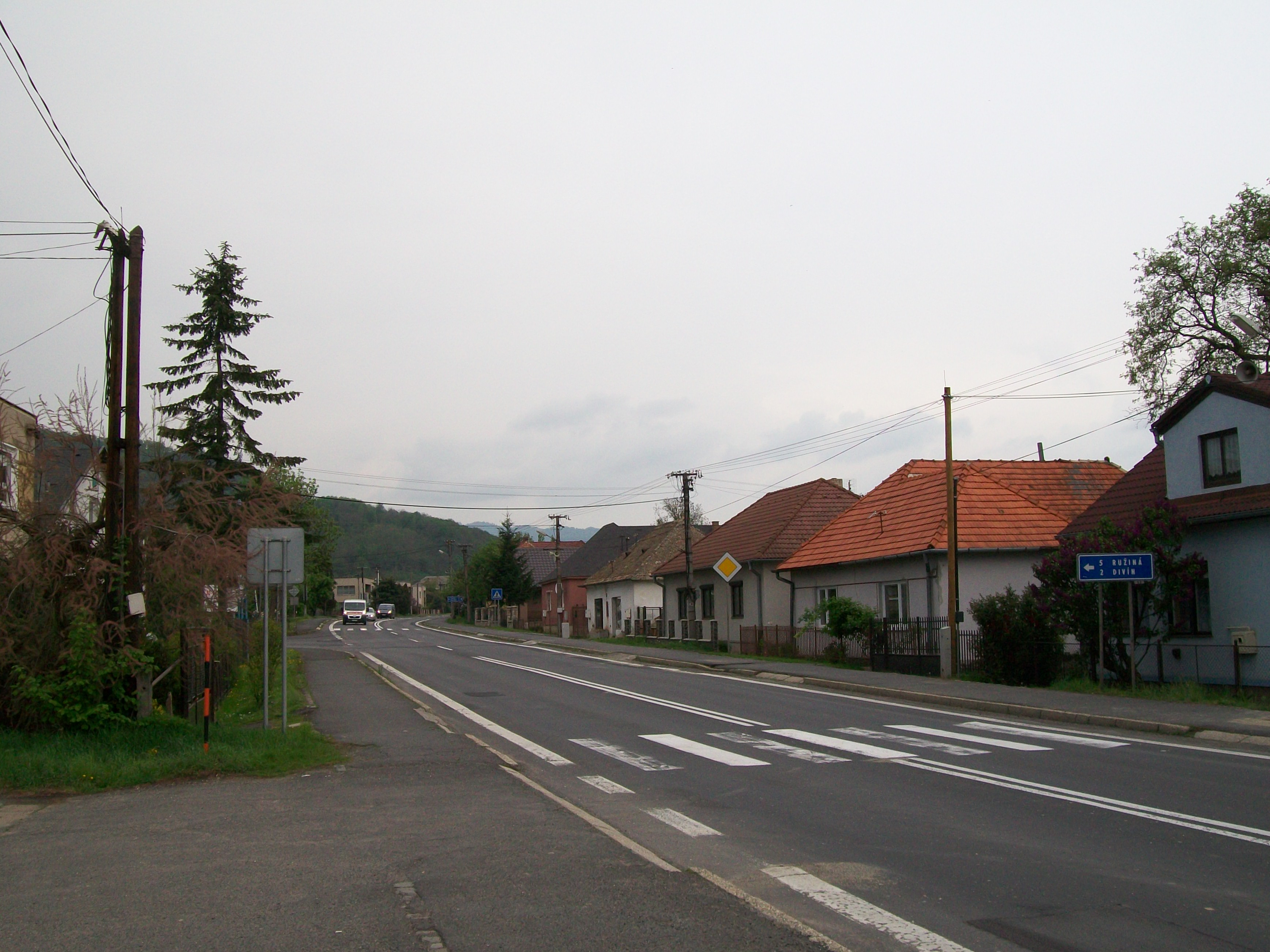

- Flag

- Location of Mýtna in the Banská Bystrica Region Location of Mýtna in Slovakia
- Coordinates: 48.47°N 19.55°E
- Country: Slovakia
- Region: Banská Bystrica Region
- District: Lučenec District
- First mentioned: 1393

Area
  - Total: 20.21 km^{2} (7.80 sq mi)
- Elevation: 252 m (827 ft)

Population (2025)
  - Total: 1,117
- Time zone: UTC+1 (CET)
  - Summer (DST): UTC+2 (CEST)
- Postal code: 985 53
- Area code: +421 47
- Vehicle registration plate (until 2022): LC
- Website: www.mytna.sk

Mýtna (Hungarian: Vámosfalva) is a village and municipality in the Lučenec District in the Banská Bystrica Region of Slovakia.

Mýtna was already settled in the prehistorical era - some scientists supposed that people already lived here in the younger Bronze Age probably 3,000 years ago. In the 7th century came Avars and then Slavs. The first mention of that village comes from 14th century (1393) called 'Wamuslehutaya' it means toll (duty) village. In 1467 'Wamosfalva' and in 1773 had nearly the present name but with i 'Mitna'. That name likely comes from 1423 when there was just several houses, and the toll house which served to pay a toll (duty) because of using the way from Zvolen to Lučenec. 2 km away lies the Castle of Divin which took the toll. In 1467 Mýtna already belonged under the Castle. Gradual settlement in the Valley of Kriváň creek came from the north and northwest and was completed settlement in the surrounding mountains in the 19th and 20th century. The village at present introduces an entrance gateway for traveling in the northwest region of Novohrad. It already has all offer of shops and services not only for own residents but also for a visitors.

== Geography ==
The municipality lies at an altitude of 252 metres (827 ft) and covers an area of 20.21 km^{2} (7.80 sq mi) (2025).

== Population ==
Population statistic (10 years)
Year	1995	2005	2015	2025
Count	1229	1203	1187	1117
Difference		−2.11%	−1.33%	−5.89%

Population statistic
Year	2024	2025
Count	1106	1117
Difference		+0.99%

It has a population of 1117 people (31 December 2025).

=== Ethnicity ===
Census 2021 (1+ %)
Ethnicity	Number	Fraction
Slovak	1120	96.13%
Not found out	36	3.09%
Total	1165	

In year 2021 was 1165 people by ethnicity 1120 as Slovak, 36 as Not found out, 7 as Other, 6 as Czech, 5 as Romani, 2 as German, 2 as Hungarian, 1 as Ukrainian, 1 as Italian, 1 as Austrian, 1 as Polish, 1 as English and 1 as Albanian.

Note on population: The difference values of population numbers in the table "Population statistic" and in the sections "Ethnicity" & "Religion" is caused by the use of various statistical methods.

=== Religion ===
Census 2021 (1+ %)
Religion	Number	Fraction
Roman Catholic Church	472	40.52%
Evangelical Church	370	31.76%
None	231	19.83%
Not found out	58	4.98%
Jehovah's Witnesses	16	1.37%
Total	1165	

In year 2021 was 1165 people by religion 472 from Roman Catholic Church, 370 from Evangelical Church, 231 from None, 58 from Not found out, 16 from Jehovah's Witnesses, 10 from Greek Catholic Church, 4 from Other, 2 from Eastern Orthodox Church, 1 from Christian Congregations in Slovakia and 1 from United Methodist Church.
