= List of national parks of Slovakia =

National parks of Slovakia (9)

There are nine national parks in Slovakia:

Name	Slovak name	Photo	Location	Established	Area	OpenStreetMap
Veľká Fatra National Park	Národný park Veľká Fatra		Veľká Fatra (Greater Fatra) Mountains	2002 (1 April)	403.71 km^{2} (155.87 sq mi)	38321635 List of national parks of Slovakia on OpenStreetMap
Malá Fatra National Park	Národný park Malá Fatra		Malá Fatra (Lesser Fatra) Mountains	1988 (1 April)	226.3 km^{2} (87.4 sq mi)	38321646 List of national parks of Slovakia on OpenStreetMap
Low Tatras National Park	Národný park Nízke Tatry		Low Tatras	1978	728 km^{2} (281 sq mi)	38321670 List of national parks of Slovakia on OpenStreetMap
Muránska planina National Park	Národný park Muránska planina		Muránska planina	1998 (27 May)	203.18 km^{2} (78.45 sq mi)	
Pieniny National Park	Pieninský národný park		Pieniny Mountains	1967 (16 January)	37.5 km^{2} (14.5 sq mi)	
Poloniny National Park	Národný park Poloniny		Bukovské vrchy Mountains	1997 (1 October)	298.05 km^{2} (115.08 sq mi)	
Slovak Karst National Park	Národný park Slovenský kras		Slovak Karst	2002 (1 March)	346.11 km^{2} (133.63 sq mi)	
Slovak Paradise National Park	Národný park Slovenský raj		Slovak Paradise	1988 (18 January)	197.63 km^{2} (76.31 sq mi)	184473
Tatra National Park	Tatranský národný park		Tatra Mountains	1949 (1 January)	703 km^{2} (271 sq mi)	38321675 List of national parks of Slovakia on OpenStreetMap

== See also ==
- Protected areas of Slovakia
