= Muránska planina =

Coordinates: 48°46′N 20°00′E

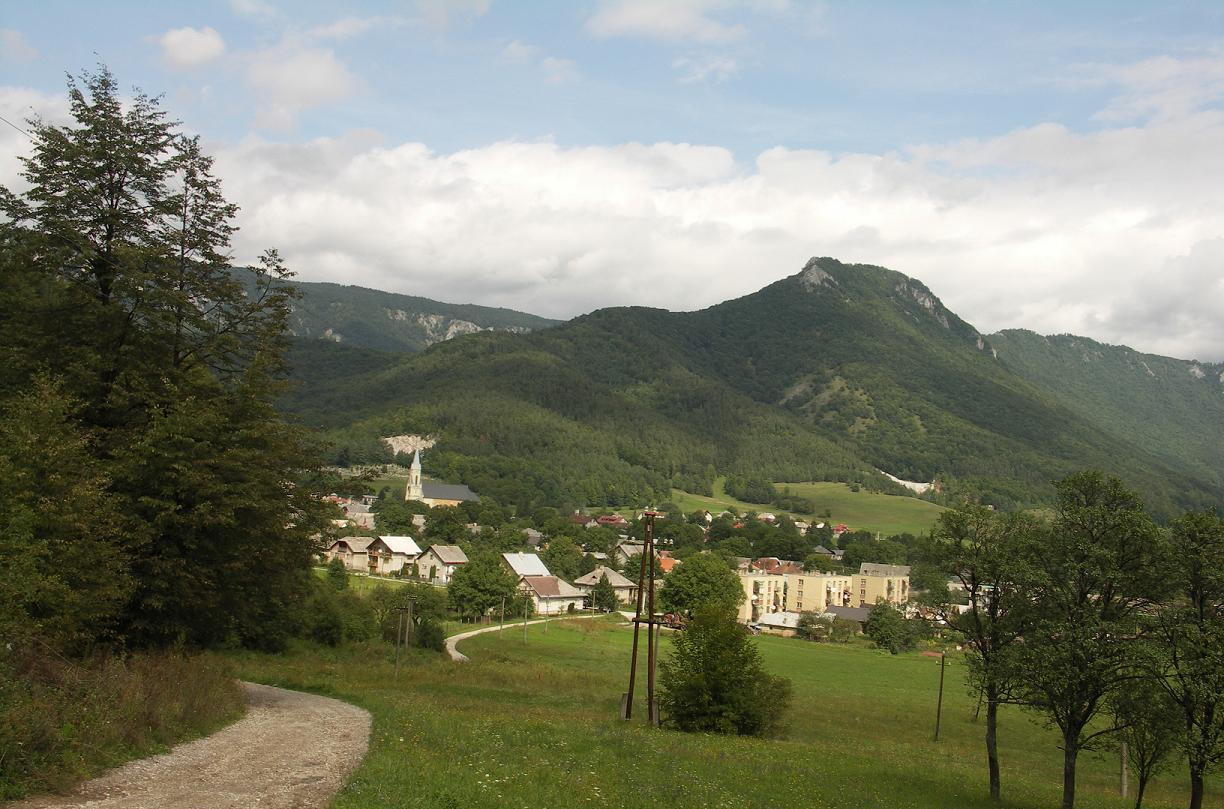
Cigánka hill (935 m ASL) above the village of Muráň

Muránska planina (translated as Muráň Plateau or Muráň Plain) is a plateau-like region in central Slovakia, between Brezno, Červená Skala (part of Šumiac), Muráň and Tisovec. It lies in the Spiš-Gemer Karst, in the Slovenské rudohorie Mountains (part of the Western Carpathian Mountains).

Muránska planina National Park is one of the youngest national parks in Slovakia, declared in October 1997 and opened on 27 May 1998.
