= Muráň =

Muráň Murányalja
- Municipality
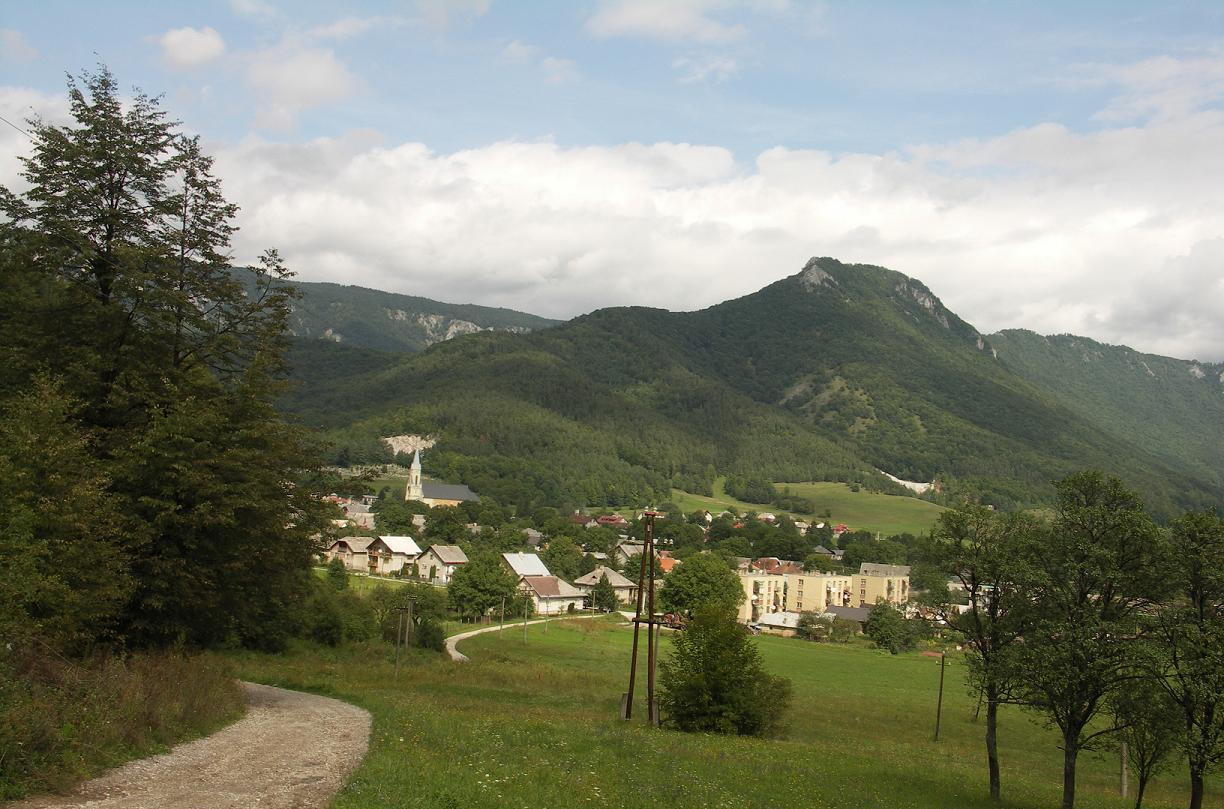
- Cigánka hill (935 m) above the village, with the ruins of the Muráň Castle

- Flag

- Location of Muráň in the Banská Bystrica Region Location of Muráň in Slovakia
- Coordinates: 48.74°N 20.05°E
- Country: Slovakia
- Region: Banská Bystrica Region
- District: Revúca District
- First mentioned: 1321

Government
  - Mayor: Roman Goldschmidt (Ind.)

Area
  - Total: 103.15 km^{2} (39.83 sq mi)
- Elevation: 393 m (1,289 ft)

Population (2025)
  - Total: 1,152
- Time zone: UTC+1 (CET)
  - Summer (DST): UTC+2 (CEST)
- Postal code: 490 1
- Area code: +421 58
- Vehicle registration plate (until 2022): RA
- Website: www.muran.sk

Muráň (earlier Podmuráň, German: Untermuran, Hungarian: Murányalja) is a village and municipality in Revúca District in the Banská Bystrica Region of Slovakia.

== Geography ==
The municipality lies at an altitude of 393 metres (1,289 ft) and covers an area of 103.15 km^{2} (39.83 sq mi) (2025).

The village is located around 9 km north of Revúca, in the Muráň river valley. The Muráň Plateau is located north and west of the village, with the governing body of the Muránska planina National Park seated in the village.

== Transportation ==
The village was connected to the railway network in the 1893. Nonetheless, the sole regular train connection to Plešivec was abolished in 2011. As of 2024, train connection to the village is only active during the summer season.

== Population ==
Population statistic (10 years)
Year	1995	2005	2015	2025
Count	1292	1250	1233	1152
Difference		−3.25%	−1.36%	−6.56%

Population statistic
Year	2024	2025
Count	1167	1152
Difference		−1.28%

It has a population of 1152 people (31 December 2025).

=== Ethnicity ===
Census 2021 (1+ %)
Ethnicity	Number	Fraction
Slovak	1098	88.83%
Not found out	105	8.49%
Romani	57	4.61%
Total	1236	

In year 2021 was 1236 people by ethnicity 1098 as Slovak, 105 as Not found out, 57 as Romani, 5 as Other, 4 as German, 3 as Hungarian, 1 as Czech, 1 as Ukrainian, 1 as Polish and 1 as Moravian.

Note on population: The difference values of population numbers in the table "Population statistic" and in the sections "Ethnicity" & "Religion" is caused by the use of various statistical methods.

=== Religion ===
Census 2021 (1+ %)
Religion	Number	Fraction
Roman Catholic Church	854	69.09%
None	195	15.78%
Not found out	101	8.17%
Evangelical Church	43	3.48%
Greek Catholic Church	14	1.13%
Total	1236	

In year 2021 was 1236 people by religion 854 from Roman Catholic Church, 195 from None, 101 from Not found out, 43 from Evangelical Church, 14 from Greek Catholic Church, 4 from Calvinist Church, 4 from Other and not ascertained christian church, 3 from Eastern Orthodox Church, 3 from Jehovah's Witnesses, 3 from Buddhism, 3 from Baptists Church, 3 from Ad hoc movements, 2 from Other, 1 from Paganism and natural spirituality, 1 from Christian Congregations in Slovakia, 1 from United Methodist Church and 1 from Seventh-day Adventist Church.

According to the 2021 census, the village had about 1,200 inhabitants, including over 200 children. About 70% of inhabitants are Roman Catholics, 4% Lutherans and 16% are without religious affiliation. According to 2019 estimate, about a third of villagers are Roma.

== History ==
The village was first mentioned in 1321 as a settlement under the Muráň Castle. Surviving written sources confirm major iron mining activities in the vicinity of the village in the mid 15th and 16th centuries. In 1574 the village was sacked by the Ottomans, who killed or enslaved nearly all inhabitants. In 1610 the village was sacked by the forces of Stephen Bocskai. A plague in 1709 and 1710 resulted in 446 dead villagers. In the 19th century the village enjoyed a period of prosperity due to an establishment of a pottery manufacture. During the World War II, Nazi soldiers killed 12 villagers as a punishment for several men from the village joining the Slovak National Uprising.

The deposed Bulgarian tsar Ferdinand I of Bulgaria lived in the Predná Hora mansion after being exiled from his homeland. The manor is now a rehabilitation facility.

The preserved historical buildings in the village are the classicist townhall built in 1806, Tossay's inn (later called Koruna hotel) from 1873 and a state of John of Nepomuk from the late 19th century.

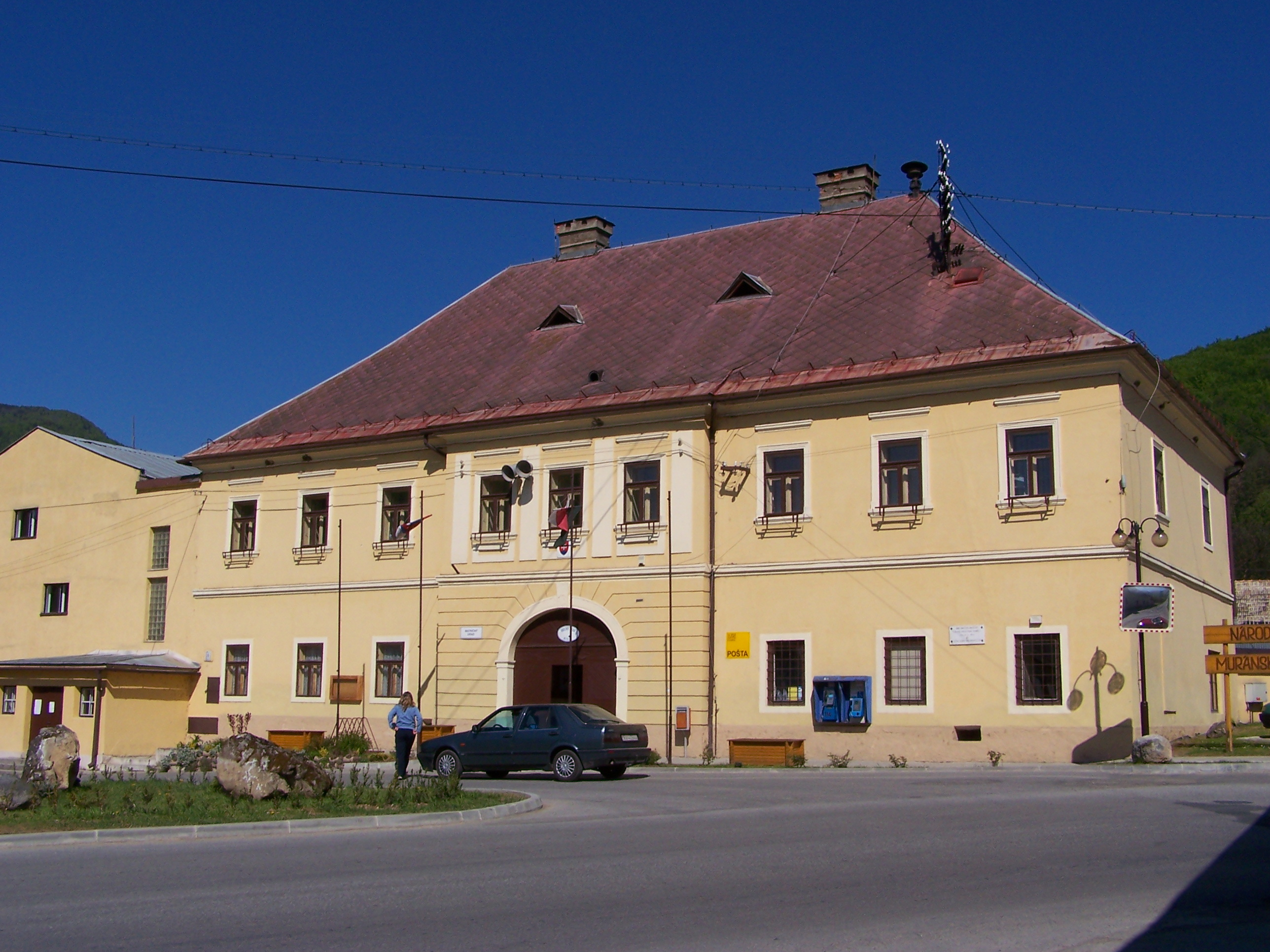
Townhall

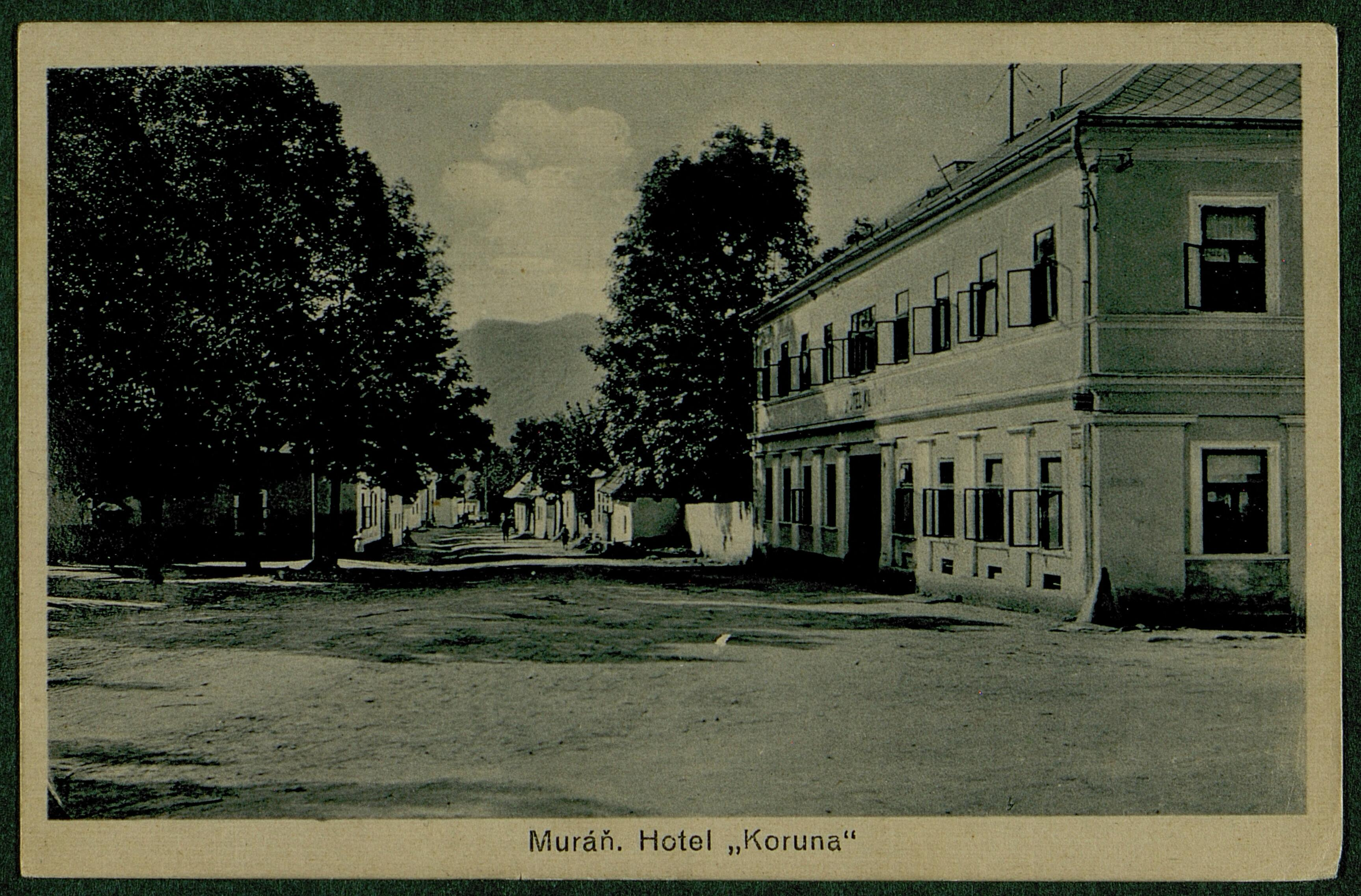
The historical Koruna hotel in the 1920s

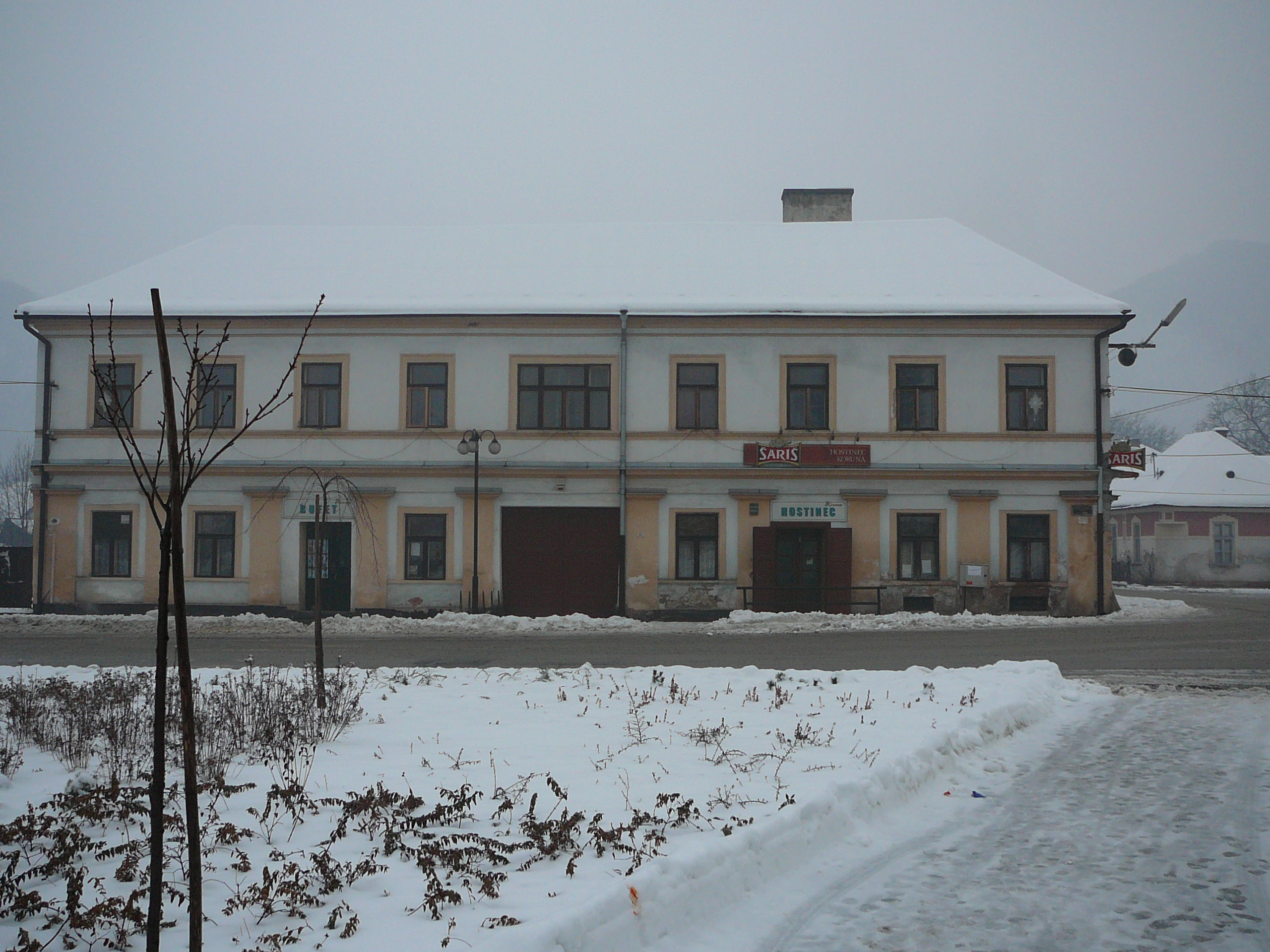
The historical Koruna hotel in 2008

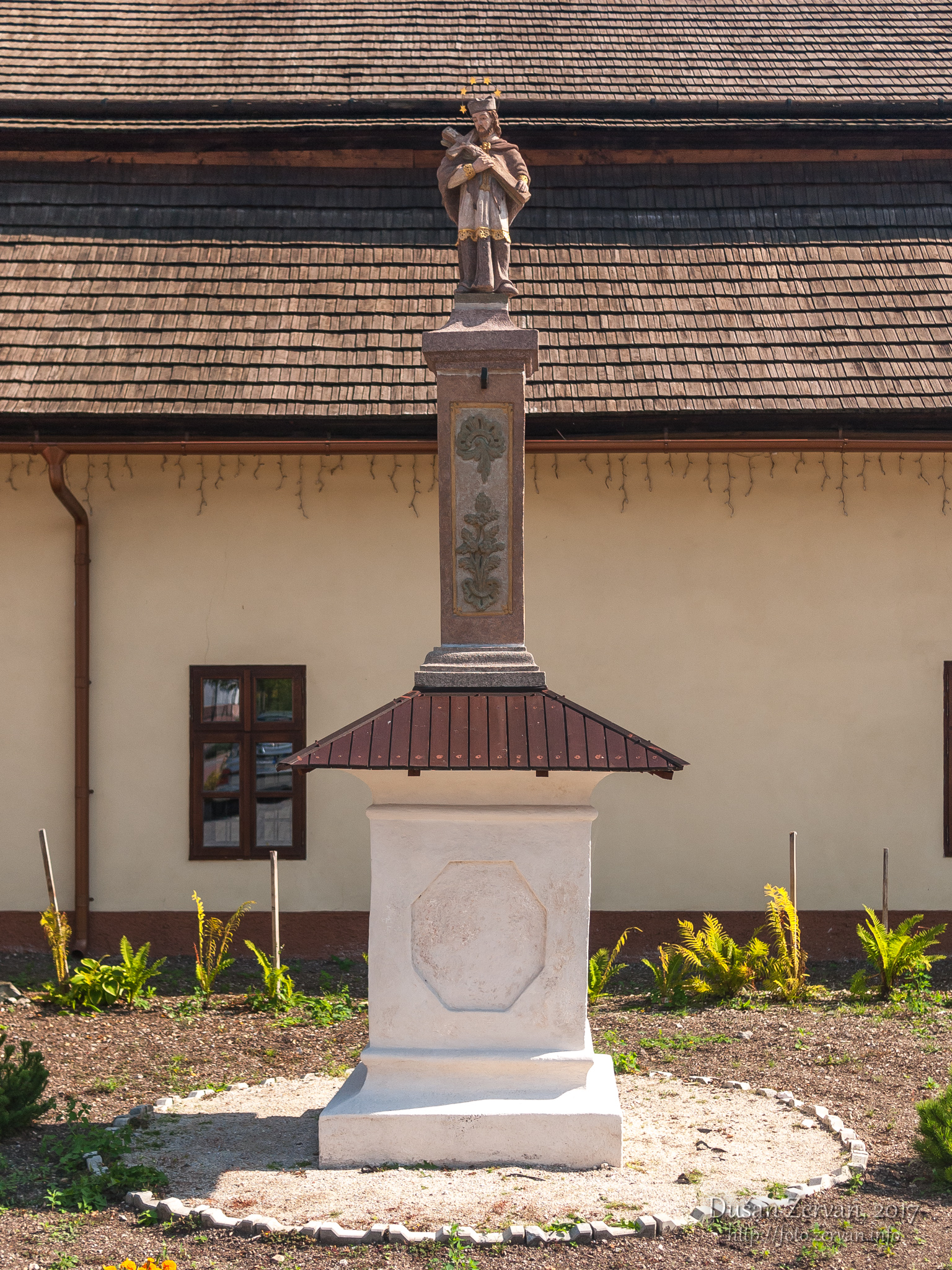
St. John of Nepomuk statue
