= Šumiac =

Šumiac Királyhegyalja
- Municipality
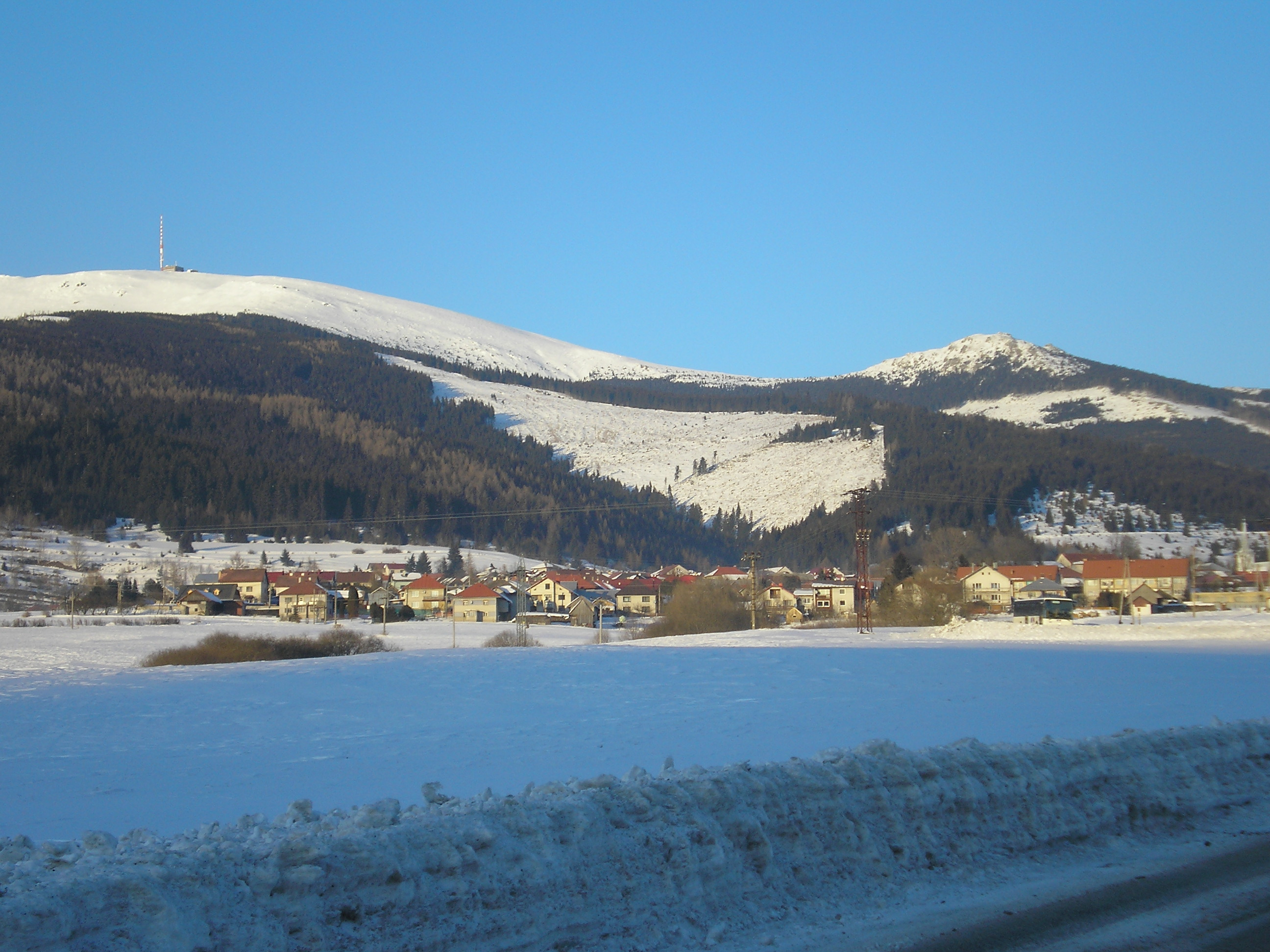

- Flag

- Location of Šumiac in the Banská Bystrica Region Location of Šumiac in Slovakia
- Coordinates: 48.85°N 20.13°E
- Country: Slovakia
- Region: Banská Bystrica Region
- District: Brezno District
- First mentioned: 1573

Area
  - Total: 81.79 km^{2} (31.58 sq mi)
- Elevation: 841 m (2,759 ft)

Population (2025)
  - Total: 1,295
- Time zone: UTC+1 (CET)
  - Summer (DST): UTC+2 (CEST)
- Postal code: 976 71
- Area code: +421 48
- Vehicle registration plate (until 2022): BR
- Website: www.sumiac.sk

Šumiac (Hungarian: Királyhegyalja) is a village and municipality in Brezno District, in the Banská Bystrica Region of central Slovakia. Šumiac was historically the western-most municipality with majority Rusyn ethnicity, along with Telgárt and Vernár. Currently, most citizens record Slovak ethnicity, but retain Greek Catholic majority with affiliation by 70% of the locals.

== Geography ==
The municipality lies at an altitude of 841 metres (2,759 ft) and covers an area of 81.79 km^{2} (31.58 sq mi) (2025).

== Population ==
Population statistic (10 years)
Year	1995	2005	2015	2025
Count	1539	1397	1278	1295
Difference		−9.22%	−8.51%	+1.33%

Population statistic
Year	2024	2025
Count	1309	1295
Difference		−1.06%

It has a population of 1295 people (31 December 2025).

=== Ethnicity ===
Census 2021 (1+ %)
Ethnicity	Number	Fraction
Slovak	1236	92.58%
Romani	415	31.08%
Not found out	89	6.66%
Total	1335	

In year 2021 was 1335 people by ethnicity 1236 as Slovak, 415 as Romani, 89 as Not found out, 9 as Rusyn, 6 as Czech, 4 as Other, 3 as Russian, 3 as Hungarian, 1 as Jewish and 1 as Turkish.

Note on population: The difference values of population numbers in the table "Population statistic" and in the sections "Ethnicity" & "Religion" is caused by the use of various statistical methods.

=== Religion ===
Census 2021 (1+ %)
Religion	Number	Fraction
Greek Catholic Church	945	70.79%
Roman Catholic Church	173	12.96%
None	105	7.87%
Not found out	79	5.92%
Total	1335	

In year 2021 was 1335 people by religion 945 from Greek Catholic Church, 173 from Roman Catholic Church, 105 from None, 79 from Not found out, 11 from Eastern Orthodox Church, 9 from Evangelical Church, 5 from Jehovah's Witnesses, 2 from Old Catholic Church, 1 from Jewish community, 1 from Other and not ascertained christian church, 1 from Christian Congregations in Slovakia, 1 from Islam, 1 from Other and 1 from Buddhism.

== Notable people ==
- Klára Jarunková (1922–2005) - writer
