= Lucky =

Lucky means having luck. It may also refer to:

== Arts and entertainment ==
=== Film ===
- People in Luck, also titled The Lucky in English, a 1963 French comedy
- Lucky: No Time for Love, a 2005 Hindi-language romance starring Salman Khan, Sneha Ullal, and Mithun Chakraborty
- Lucky, a 2005 short film by Avie Luthra
- Lucky, a 2010 American documentary by Jeffrey Blitz
- Lucky (2011 film), an American crime comedy starring Colin Hanks
- Lucky (2012 Kannada film), a romantic comedy
- Lucky (2012 Telugu film), a romantic comedy
- Lucky (2017 American film), an American drama directed by John Carroll Lynch and starring Harry Dean Stanton
- Lucky (2017 Italian film), Italian name Fortunata, an Italian melodrama directed by Sergio Castellitto
- Lucky (2019 film), American animated film
- Lucky (2020 film), an American horror film starring Brea Grant
- Lucky, a 2020 Belgian film by Olivier Van Hoofstadt

=== Television ===
- Lucky (American TV series), a 2003 American dark-comedy series
- Lucky (Indian TV series), a 2006–2007 fantasy-drama series
- Lucky (miniseries), a 2026 American drama miniseries
- "Lucky" (Criminal Minds), a season three episode
- "Lucky" (Medium), a season one episode
- "Lucky" (Parks and Recreation), a season four episode
- "Lucky" (The Secret Circle), a season one episode

=== Literature ===
- Lucky (magazine), a 2000–2015 American fashion and lifestyle magazine
- Lucky (memoir), a 1999 book by Alice Sebold
- Lucky: How Joe Biden Barely Won the Presidency, a 2021 book by Jonathan Allen and Amie Parnes
- Lucky (von Ziegesar novel), a 2007 It Girl novel by Cecily von Ziegesar
- Lucky, a 1985 Santangelo novel by Jackie Collins

=== Music ===
==== Albums ====
- Lucky (Fifteen album) or the title song (1999)
- Lucky (Marty Balin album) (1983)
- Lucky (Megan Moroney album) (2023)
- Lucky (Melissa Etheridge album) or the title song (2004)
- Lucky (Misato Watanabe album) (1991)
- Lucky (Nada Surf album) (2008)
- Lucky (Towa Tei album) (2013)
- Lucky (Kim Hyun-joong EP), (2011)
- Lucky (Weki Meki EP) or the title song (2018)
- Lucky, a 1994 album by Janitor Joe
- Lucky, a 2008 album by Molly Johnson
- Lucky, a 1996 album by Skin

==== Songs ====
- "Lucky" (Britney Spears song), 2000
- "Lucky" (Halsey song), 2024
- "Lucky" (Jade Eagleson song), 2019
- "Lucky" (Jason Mraz and Colbie Caillat song), 2009
- "Lucky" (Lucky Twice song), 2006
- "Lucky" (Radiohead song), 1997
- "Lucky" (Riize song), 2024
- "Lucky (In My Life)", by Eiffel 65, 2001
- "(Believed You Were) Lucky", by 'Til Tuesday, 1988
- "Lucky", by 311 from Grassroots, 1994
- "Lucky", by Aurora from All My Demons Greeting Me as a Friend, 2016
- "Lucky", by Bif Naked from I Bificus, 1998
- "Lucky", by Charli XCX from Pop 2, 2017
- "Lucky", by the Dead Milkmen from Big Lizard in My Backyard, 1985
- "Lucky", by Donna Summer from Bad Girls, 1979
- "Lucky", by Erika de Casier from Still, 2024
- "Lucky", by Exo from XOXO, 2013
- "Lucky", by Hoobastank from The Reason, 2003
- "Lucky", by Laura Branigan from Branigan 2, 1983
- "Lucky", by Mabel from High Expectations, 2019
- "Lucky", by Meghan Trainor from Takin' It Back, 2022
- "Lucky", by Richard Wells from the soundtrack of the TV series Being Human, 2011
- "Lucky", by Seven Mary Three from RockCrown, 1997
- "Lucky", by Seventeen from An Ode, 2019
- "Lucky", by SR-71 from Tomorrow, 2002

=== Other uses in arts and entertainment ===
- Lucky (fictional character), a list of fictional characters with the name
- Lucky Records, the name of several record labels

== Businesses and organisations ==
- Lucky Air, airline based in China
- Lucky Brand Jeans, an American clothing company
- Lucky, a brand name of LG Corporation, a South Korean conglomerate
- Lucky Lager, a North American beer brand
- Lucky Stores, two distinct and separate grocery chains, one in California and the other in Utah
- Lucky Strike, a cigarette brand sometimes referred to as "Luckies"
- LuckyFM Ibaraki Broadcasting System, a commercial radio station in Ibaraki Prefercture, Japan

== Places ==
=== United States ===
- Lucky, Kentucky
- Lucky, Louisiana
- Lucky, West Virginia

=== Slovakia ===
- Lúčky, Michalovce District
- Lúčky, Ružomberok District
- Lúčky, Žiar nad Hronom District

== People ==
- Lucky (name), a list of people with the surname or given name
- Lucky (nickname), a list of people with the nickname or stage name
- List of people known as the Lucky

== Mascots ==
- Lucky, the leprechaun mascot of the breakfast cereal Lucky Charms
- Lucky, the leprechaun mascot of the Boston Celtics basketball team
- Lucky and To Lucky, mascots of the Hanshin Tigers baseball team in Japan

== Dogs ==
- Lucky (dog), received the Dickin Medal for bravery in the Malayan Emergency
- Lucky, the name of two dogs owned by U.S. Presidents

== Other uses ==
- Several types of bets offered by UK bookmakers

== See also ==
- Lucki (disambiguation)
