= Lucky (fictional character) =

List of fictional characters named Lucky

Fictional characters named Lucky include:

- Lucky (Pokémon) or Chansey
- Lucky (Waiting for Godot), in Samuel Beckett's play
- Lucky Chikna, a villain in the 1998 Indian film Gunda, played by Razak Khan
- Lucky Chloe, in the Tekken video game series
- Lucky Jack, a rabbit from Disney's Home on the Range
- Elroy "Lucky" Kleinschmidt, in the animated television series King of the Hill
- Lucky Luke, a cowboy in a series of French language comic books
- Lucky Prescott, a girl in the DreamWorks TV series Spirit Riding Free and film Spirit Untamed
- Lucky Santangelo, in the Santangelo novel series
- Laxman "Lucky" Prasad Sharma, in the 2004 Indian film Main Hoon Na
- Lucky Spencer, in the TV soap opera General Hospital
- Lucky Starr, protagonist of the Lucky Starr series of science fiction children's novels, by Isaac Asimov (as Paul French)
- Little Miss Lucky, in the Little Miss children's book series by Roger Hargreaves
- Lucky the Dinosaur, a robotic dinosaur at Disney theme parks
- Lucky, a dog in the Disney film One Hundred and One Dalmatians and subsequent adaptations
- Lucky, the main character in the children's novel The Higher Power of Lucky
- Lucky the Ninja Cat, in the 2021 Google Doodle browser game Doodle Champion Island Games
- Lucky Otogami, the protagonist of the manga series PPPPPP
- Lucky, a character from the Australian television series Bluey

== See also ==
- Lucky (name)
- Lucky (nickname)
- Lucky (dog)
- Lucky (disambiguation)#Mascots
