= Canike =

Crimean princess from the Chingissid dynasty

Canike Hanım
- Canike, جانـيـكه
- Pronunciation: Crimean Tatar pronunciation: [d͡ʒʔaːniːke]
- Born: the end of XIVth century presumably, Qırq Or, Crimean Ulus of the Golden Horde
- Died: 1437; Qırq Or
- Resting place: Chufut-Kale; 44°44′27″N 33°55′27″E
- Spouse: Edige
- Children: Nureddin
- Parents: Tokhtamysh (father); Togaybek (mother)

Canike (late 14th century – 1437) was a Crimean princess from the Chingissid dynasty. She was the daughter of the Khan Tokhtamysh and the wife of Emir Edigu. In 1416 she made a pilgrimage to Mecca, gaining her fame in the Muslim world. She played an important role in the separation of the Crimean Khanate from the Golden Horde. She supported the future first Crimean Khan, Hacı I Giray, in the fight against Küchük Muhammad and Sayid Ahmad I. When she died in 1437 she was buried in a specially built mausoleum with the title "Great Empress."

== Biography ==
Canike was most likely born in the late 14th century in Crimea. Her father was Tokhtamysh, who was the Khan of the Golden Horde from 1379 to 1380. Almost nothing is known for certain about her childhood, but it is known that she was her father's favorite daughter.

After her father Tokhtamysh was defeated by Timur, her marriage to Edigu caused Edigu's influence over Tokhtamysh grew, since it caused Tokhtamysh to have family ties to Edigu's family.

In 1397, Edigu suddenly changed his alliance from Tokhtamysh to Timur, who was at war with him at the time. Enraged, Tokhtamysh killed Canike's mother Togaybek in a fit of rage. Tokhtamysh's political influence declined by the end of the 14th century.

In 1406, Edigu captured Khwarazm. In 1411 to 1412, Canike's brother Jalal al-Din tried to besiege Khwarazm, but ultimately failed. As Canike wanted to increase her own political influence in the Golden Horde, she famously made Hajj to Mecca in 1416. Her arrival in Damascus attracted considerable attention from the Arab population, since she was accompanied by 300 horsemen.

Canike used her influence to convince her husband to spare her brother, three-year-old Qadir Berdi; Edigu wanted to kill him so that only his son would be a legitimate claimant to the throne of the Golden Horde. And eleven years later, Qadir Berdi became the Khan of the Golden Horde at the age of fourteen and then led an army against Edigu. Edigu died in the ensuing battle, and Qadir Berdi died of wounds three days later, leaving Canike the eldest of the Tokhtamysh clan who could claim the throne in Kyrk-Ore.

In the context of all the strife in the Golden Horde at the time, Crimea became more isolated from the rest of the Golden Horde, as well as the geographical location of Crimea compared to the rest of the Golden Horde.

During the height of her power, Canike supported Hacı I Giray in his fight for power in Crimea against the descendants of Tokhtamysh, Küchük Muhammad, and Sayid Ahmad I who were all competing for power in Crimea. Canike remained a key figure throughout the process of Hacı I Giray's rise to power.

She died in Crimea in 1437, which weakened Hacı I Giray and causing him to emigrate to Lithuania.

== Legacy ==
There are many legends and folktales surrounding the life and death of Canike. According to one legend, she died while defending the fortress of Kryk-Or from an enemy attack. A mausoleum was built for her in Chufut-Kale.
