= Simḥah Isaac Luzki =

- Born: 1716; Lutsk, Volhynia
- Died: 1760 or 1766; Chufut-Kale, Crimea or Lutsk, Volhynia
- Writing career
- Literary movement: Haskalah

Simḥah Isaac ben Moses Luzki (Hebrew: שמחה יצחק בן משה לוצקי, Russian: Симха Исаак бен-Моисей Луцкий, Polish: Sima Izaak Łucki; 1716 – 1760/66), also known as the "Karaite Rashi" and "Olam Tsa'ir," was a Karaite Kabbalist, writer, and bibliographer.

== Biography ==
Simḥah Isaac Luzki was born in the Volhynian city of Lutsk. In the introduction to most of his works he mentioned that he was the son of Moses son of Simhah, son of Joseph, son of Yeshu'a (who died in Derazhne in 1649 during the Khmelnytsky Uprising), son of Simḥah, son of Yeshu'a, son of Samuel, of a noble family.

He resided in his hometown until the early 1750s, when he moved to Chufut-Kale, Crimea, where there was a flourishing Karaite community. He was received into the house of the writer Mordecai ben Berakah Yerushalmi, and succeeded Samuel Kala'i as teacher of the city's bet ha-midrash. Luzki rendered great services to Karaite literature both as copyist of early Karaite Jewish manuscripts and as writer of various studies of theology, philosophy, Halakha, and Kabbalah.

His Light of the Righteous (1757) is a history of Karaite Judaism and its literature in which he presented a spiritual genealogy for the Sevel ha-Yerushah (the Karaite Jewish "unwritten" version of the Mishna) from Judah ben Tabbai.

== Works ==
- Be'er Yitsḥak, commentary on Judah Gibbor's Minḥat Yehudah on the Pentateuch.
- Siaḥ Yitsḥak, commentary on the prayer for the Day of Atonement.
- Reshit Ḥokhmah, commentary in three volumes on the daily prayers.
- Me'irat 'Enayim ('Light of the Righteous', 1757), code in two volumes, of which the first, entitled Ner Mitsvah, comprises the Commandments and their explanations, and the second, entitled Ner Tsaddikim, enumerates the differences between the Rabbinites and the Karaites and gives a genealogy of the Karaite scholars and a list of their works.
- Sha'are Tsedek, on the Hebrew calendar.
- 'Akedat Yitsḥak, on the laws concerning the slaughtering of animals, and on the ten Karaite articles of belief.
- Kevod Elohim, commentary on Joseph ben Mordecai Troki's mystic prayer Ha-Elef Leka.
- Arba' Yesodot, on the four dogmatic principles, namely, the creation of the world, the existence of an invisible God, His holiness and spirituality, and His unity.
- Tefillah le-Mosheh, questions and answers exchanged between God and Moses.
- Halikhot 'Olam, description of the creation of the world and of the nature of all things according to their quantitative and qualitative attributes.
- 'Ene Yitsḥak, commentary on Elijah Bashyazi's calendric tables.
- Toledot Yitsḥak, religious poems, enigmas, letters, etc., in two volumes.
- Ture Zahab u-Nekuddot ha-Kesef, on the precepts, in two volumes, of which the first, Ture Zahab, enumerates in verse all the precepts, arranged in the order of the 620 letters of the Decalogue; the second, Nekuddot Kesef, being a commentary thereon.
- Sefer Bereshit, a mystic explanation of the Creation.
- Rekeb Elohim, on the mysteries of the Divine Chariot.
- Kevod Melakhim, a mystic explanation of the letters of the Hebrew alphabet.
- Sefer ha-Tappuaḥ, on the Creation and on the Divine Chariot, according to the modern Kabbalah.
- Livnat ha-Sappir, on the ten Sefirot.
