= Nürəddin =

- Location within Azerbaijan Location within East Zangezur Economic Region
- Coordinates: 39°49′03″N 46°30′39″E
- Country: Azerbaijan
- Rayon: Lachin
- Time zone: UTC+4 (AZT)
  - Summer (DST): UTC+5 (AZT)

Nürəddin (also, Nurəddin and Noradin) is a village in the Lachin Rayon of Azerbaijan.

The villages next to Nürəddin are Fərraş (2 kilometres (1 mi)) Suvat (3 kilometres (2 mi)) Kalafalıq (3 kilometres (2 mi)) Ardıclı (3 kilometres (2 mi)) Bozgüney (3 kilometres (2 mi)) Hagnəzər (5 kilometres (3 mi)) Vaqazin (5 kilometres (3 mi)) Piçənis (6 kilometres (4 mi)) Ağcayazı (6 kilometres (4 mi)) Ərdəşəvi (6 kilometres (4 mi))

There is a secondary school of Nürəddin village. Primary school of this village was called Arduşlu (Ardushlu).
