= Lucki (disambiguation) =

Lucki is an American rapper and record producer from Chicago, Illinois.

Lucki may also refer to:

- Lucki Stipetić, German film producer
- Łucki (surname), Polish-language surname
