= Łucki =

Łucki is a Polish-language toponymic surname literally meaning "from/of Łuck". Notable people with this surname include:

- Brenda Lucki, first female Canadian police commissioner
- Jerzy Michał Łucki (1898–1939), Polish bobsledder, military officer and athlete
- Simḥah Isaac Luzki (1716–1766), qaraim maskil, theologian, kabbalist writer, scholar, bibliographer and spiritual leader
