= Haqnəzər =

- Location within Azerbaijan Location within East Zangezur Economic Region
- Coordinates: 39°46′28″N 46°30′41″E
- Country: Azerbaijan
- District: Lachin
- Time zone: UTC+4 (AZT)
  - Summer (DST): UTC+5 (AZT)

Haqnəzər (Hagnazar) is a village in the Lachin District of Azerbaijan.
