= Lucky, West Virginia =

Lucky
- Unincorporated community
- Location within the state of West Virginia Lucky (the United States)
- Coordinates: 39°10′12″N 81°32′49″W
- Country: United States
- State: West Virginia
- County: Wood
- Elevation: 600 ft (180 m)
- Time zone: UTC-5 (Eastern (EST))
  - Summer (DST): UTC-4 (EDT)
- GNIS ID: 1560434

Lucky was an unincorporated community in Wood County, West Virginia, United States.
