= Kalafalıq =

- Location within Azerbaijan Location within East Zangezur Economic Region
- Coordinates: 39°47′39″N 46°31′55″E
- Country: Azerbaijan
- Rayon: Lachin
- Time zone: UTC+4 (AZT)
  - Summer (DST): UTC+5 (AZT)

Kalafalıq (also, Kalafalyk and Kyalafalyk) is a village in the Lachin Rayon of Azerbaijan.
