= Chufut-Kale =

Historic settlement in Crimea

Çufut Qale Чуфут-Кале
- Historic settlement
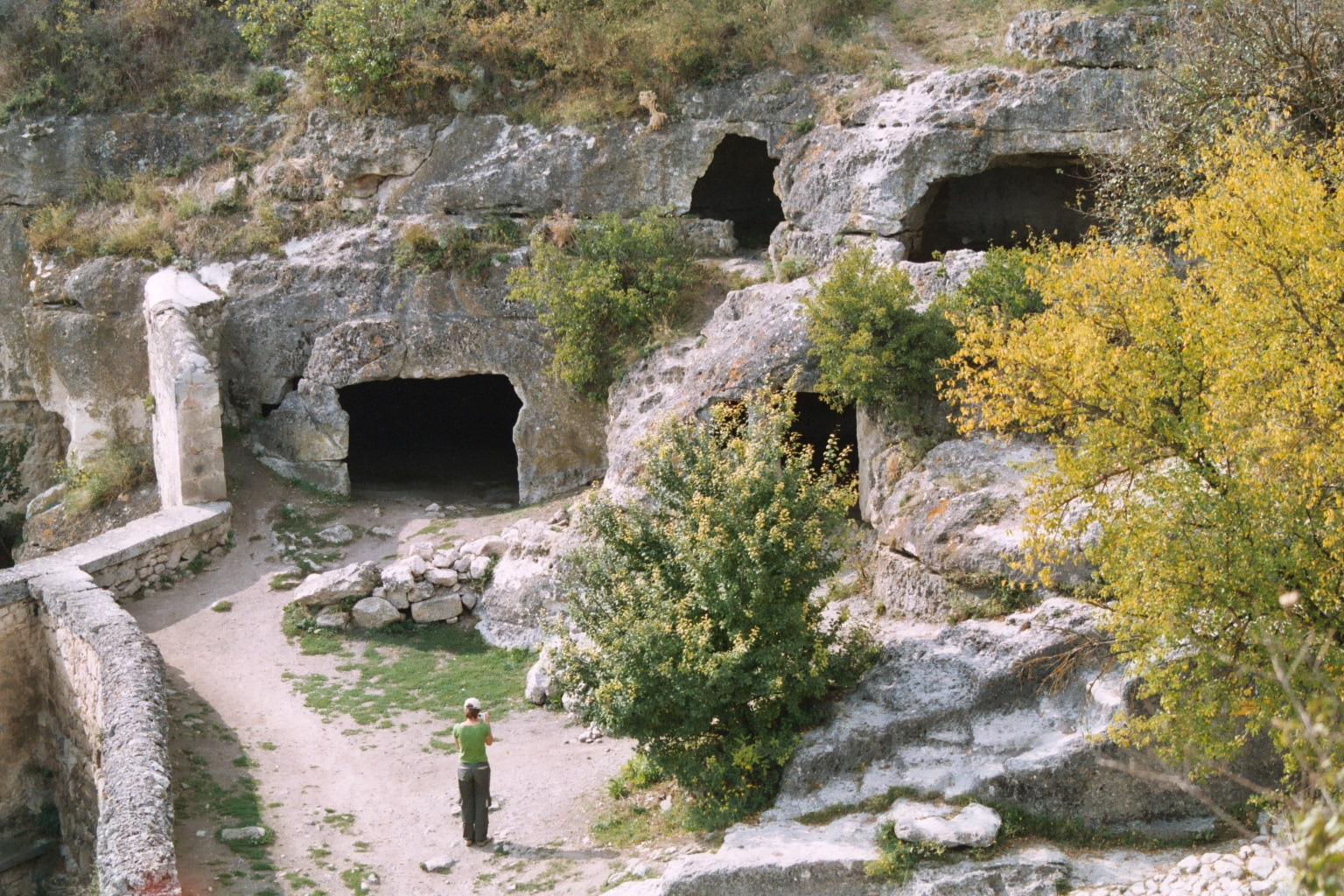
- Chufut-Kale cave city

- Location of Chufut-Kale in Crimea
- Coordinates: 44°44′28″N 33°55′28″E
- Country: Ukraine/Russia
- Region: Crimea
- Raion: Bakhchysarai Raion
- Established: 6th - 10th century
- Time zone: UTC+4 (MSK)

Immovable Monument of National Significance of Ukraine
- Official name: Фортеця і печерне місто «Чуфут-Кале» (Fortress and the cave city of Chufut-Kale)
- Type: Architecture
- Reference no.: 010082

Chufut-Kale (Crimean Tatar: Çufut Qale, pronounced [tʃuˈfut qaˈle]; Russian and Ukrainian: Чуфут-Кале, romanized: Chufut-Kale; Karaim: Кала, קלעה, romanized: Kala) is a medieval city-fortress in the Crimean Mountains that now lies in ruins. It is a national monument of Crimean Karaites culture just 3 km (1.9 mi) east of Bakhchysarai.

Its name is Crimean Tatar and Turkish for "Jewish Fortress" (çufut/çıfıt - Jew, qale/kale - fortress), while Crimean Karaites refer to it simply as "Fortress", considering the place as a historical center for the Crimean Karaite community. In the Middle Ages the fortress was known as Qırq Yer (Place of Forty) and as Karaites to which sect the greater part of its inhabitants belong, Sela' ha-Yehudim (Hebrew for 'Rock of the Jews').

== Name versions ==
- Чуфут-Кале (Russian or Ukrainian transliteration: Chufut Kale) is mentioned in the Soviet scientific literature, as well as in the works of Karaite authors in the Russian language from the second half of the 19th century to the post-Soviet epoch, including Seraya Shapshal's publications;
- Juft Qale [Джуфт Кале] is used by modern Crimean Karaite leaders, arguing that this is the original name of the town (in translation from Turkic - Double fortress), that over time it evolved into "a wrong but more easily pronounced name: Chufut-Kale [Чуфут Кале] or Chuft-Kale [Чуфт Кале]";
- Qırq Yer, Qırq Or, Kyrk-Or, Gevher Kermen Çufut-Qale, Çıfut-Qalesi, Orda-i muazzam Kirkyir were the Crimean Tatar names during the Crimean Khanate;
- Kala (Karaim: קלעה, кала, kala - fortress);
- Sela Yuhudim (Hebrew: סלע יהודים - "Rock of the Jews" (in the Karaite pronunciation) was used in Crimean Karaite literature until the second half of 19th century;
- Sela ha-Karaim (Hebrew: סלע הקראים - "Rock of the Karaites") used by Crimean Karaites from the second half of 19th century;

== History ==
Researchers are not unanimous as to the time of the town's appearance. It was probably a fortified settlement in the 5th or 6th century on the periphery of the Byzantine Empire. Others think that the fortified settlement appeared in the 10th-11th centuries. During the early period of the town's history, it was mainly populated by Alans, the most powerful of the late Sarmatian tribes, who spoke an Eastern Iranian language that was the ancestor of Ossetian. They began penetrating Crimea in the 2nd century. Settling down in this mountainous region, the Alans adopted Christianity. In written sources, the cave town is mentioned in the 13th century under the name of Kyrk-Or ("Forty Fortifications"). This name lasted until the mid-17th century.

In 1299, the Golden Horde forces under Nogai Khan raided Crimea; at that time, Kyrk Or was then garrisoned by Byzantine soldiers. The stout fortress resisted direct storming by the Tatars, who then contrived to weaken the defenders by playing loud music for three days and nights. On the fourth morning, the defenders were too exhausted to repel a fresh attack, and the fortress succumbed to a general massacre. Having thus seized the town, the Tatars quartered their garrison in it. At the turn of the 15th century, Tatars settled Karaite craftsmen in front of the eastern line of fortifications and built a second defensive wall to protect their settlement, and thus a new part of the town appeared.

After the Fall of Constantinople in 1453, many Karaite Jews, who were still Greek speakers, decided to migrate to Crimea, and in particular to the Principality of Theodoro and Chufut-Kale, as Crimea had a familiar Byzantine culture.

In the 15th century, the first Crimean Khan, Hacı I Giray, realizing the fortress’ advantages, turned the old section of the town into his fortified residence. After the defeat of the Golden Horde, the Crimean Khanate became considerably stronger. The significance of Kyrk-Or as a stronghold declined, and the Crimean Khan, Meñli I Giray, moved his capital to Bakhchysarai. The old town remained a citadel of Bakhchysarai and a place of incarceration for aristocratic prisoners.

In the mid-17th century, the Tatars left Kyrk-Or. Only the Karaites and several Krymchak families remained living there due to anti-Jewish restrictions on stays in other towns of the Crimean Khanate. The town gradually acquired the name of Chufut-Kale, which in Turkic meant "Jewish fortress", with a negative and scornful meaning.

After the Annexation of the Crimean Khanate by the Russian Empire in 1783, the fortress inhabitants were permitted to live anywhere in the Crimea. From that time on, Chufut-Kale was deserted. By the mid-19th century the town ceased to exist.

== Legends ==
There are many legends concerning the place. According to one, it was called "Qırq Yer" because the khans Meñli Giray or Tokhtamysh, the founders of the city, brought with them forty Karaite families, and in their honor called it the "Place of Forty".

Another legend, fostered by the Karaites to show the antiquity of their sect, says that Karaites were brought there from Persia at the time of the first Exile. The early settlers of the city exercised great influence upon their neighbors, the Khazars. The hakham Abraham Firkovich, who was very skilful in falsifying epitaphs and manuscripts, pretended to have unearthed at the cemetery of Chufut-Kale tombstones dating from the year 6 of the common era and to have discovered the tomb of Sangari, which is still shown by the Karaites. According to Harkavy, however, no epitaph earlier than 1203 can be seen at the cemetery of Chufut-Kale, called "Vale of Jehoshaphat"; and the tombs do not belong to Karaites, but to the old Rabbinite settlers called Krymchaks. Chufut-Kale, however, existed as early as the seventh century. Abu al-Fida mentions it under the name "Qırq Yer".

== Gallery ==
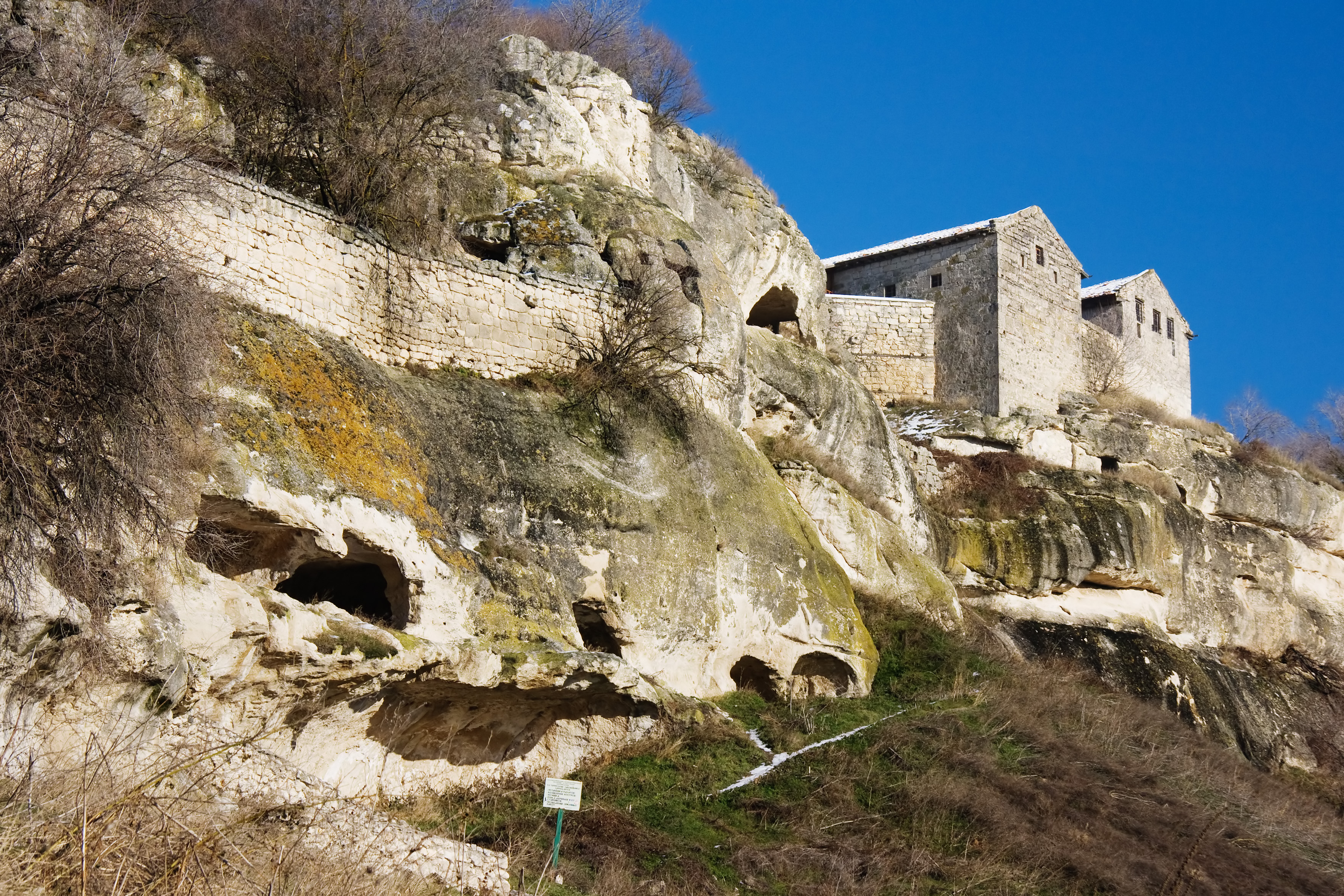
Close-up view of the kenassas

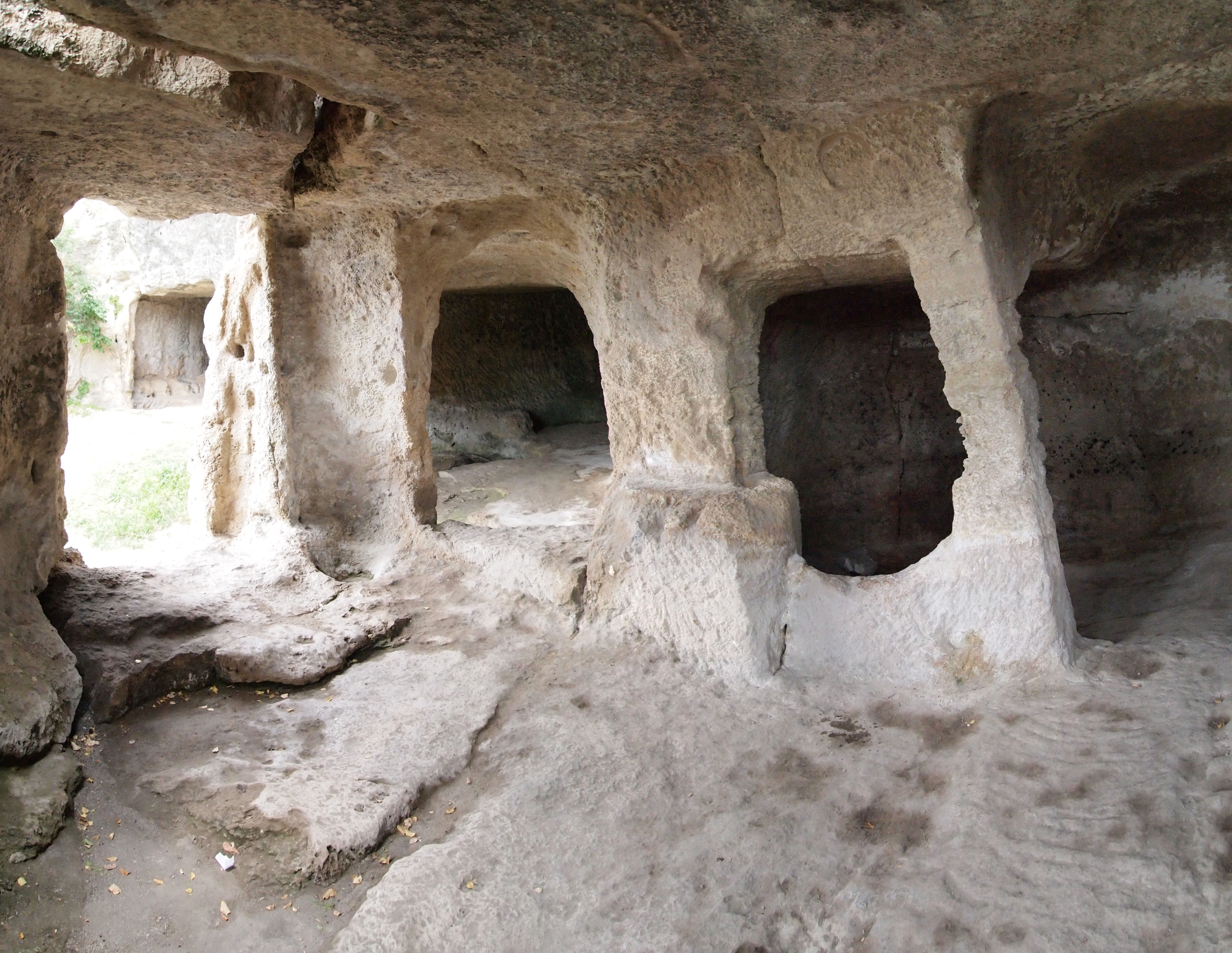
Inside a cave

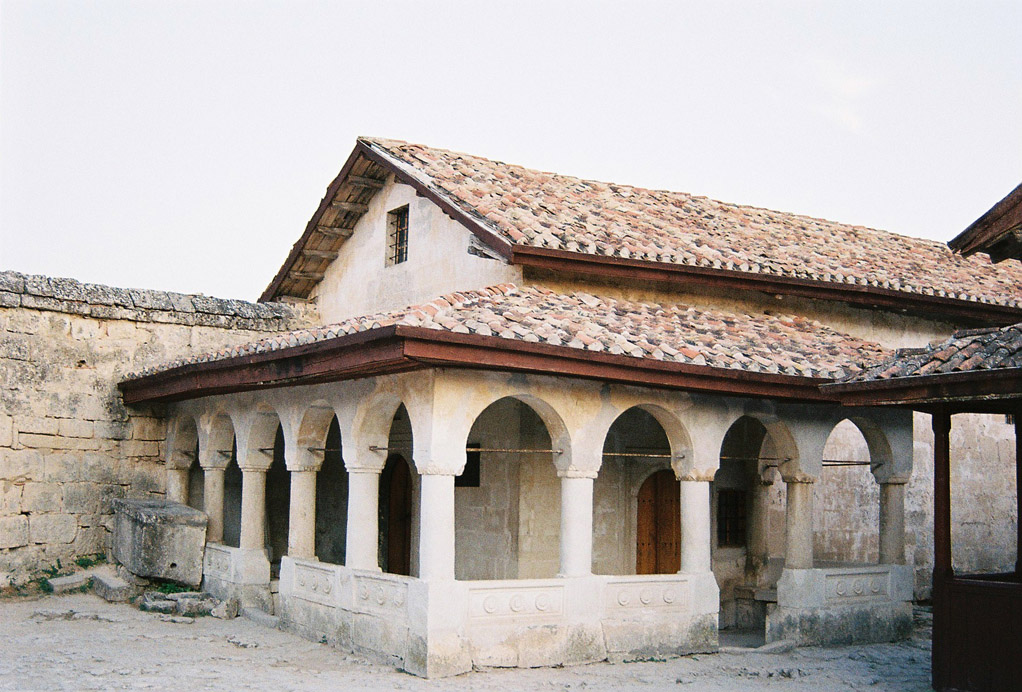
One of the kenassa buildings

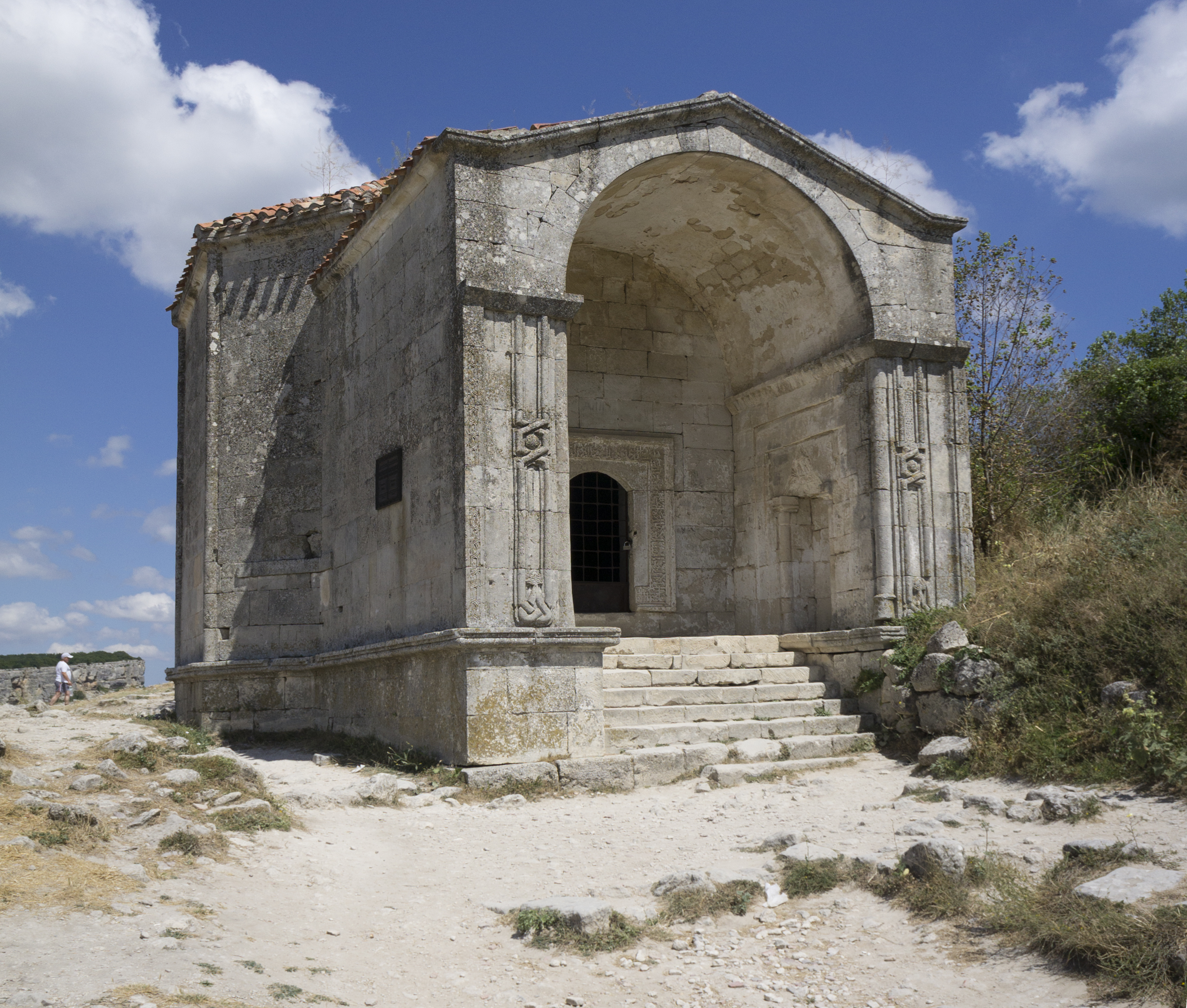
Mausoleum of Dzhanike-Khanym, daughter of Tokhtamysh

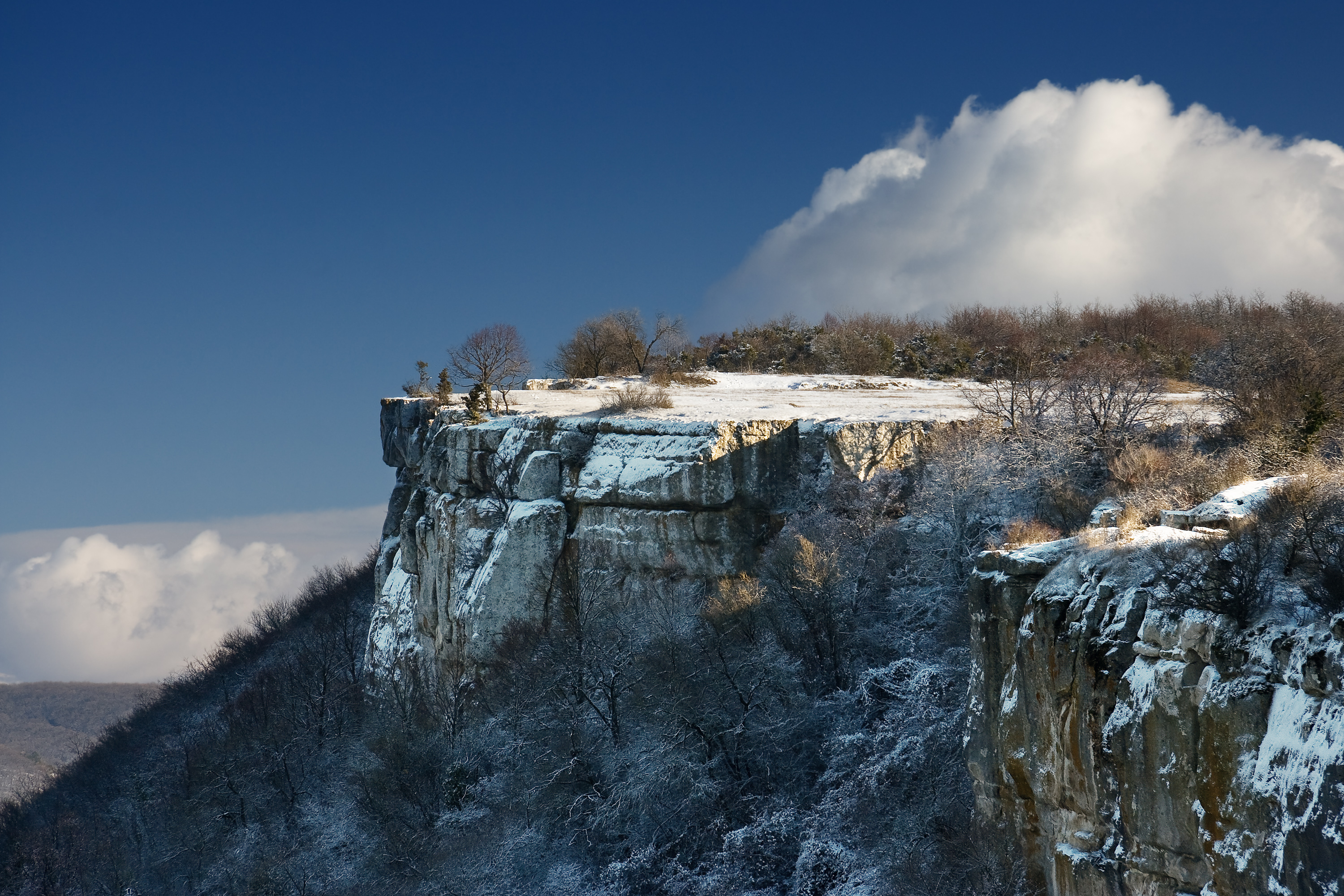
A panorama of the caves and walls

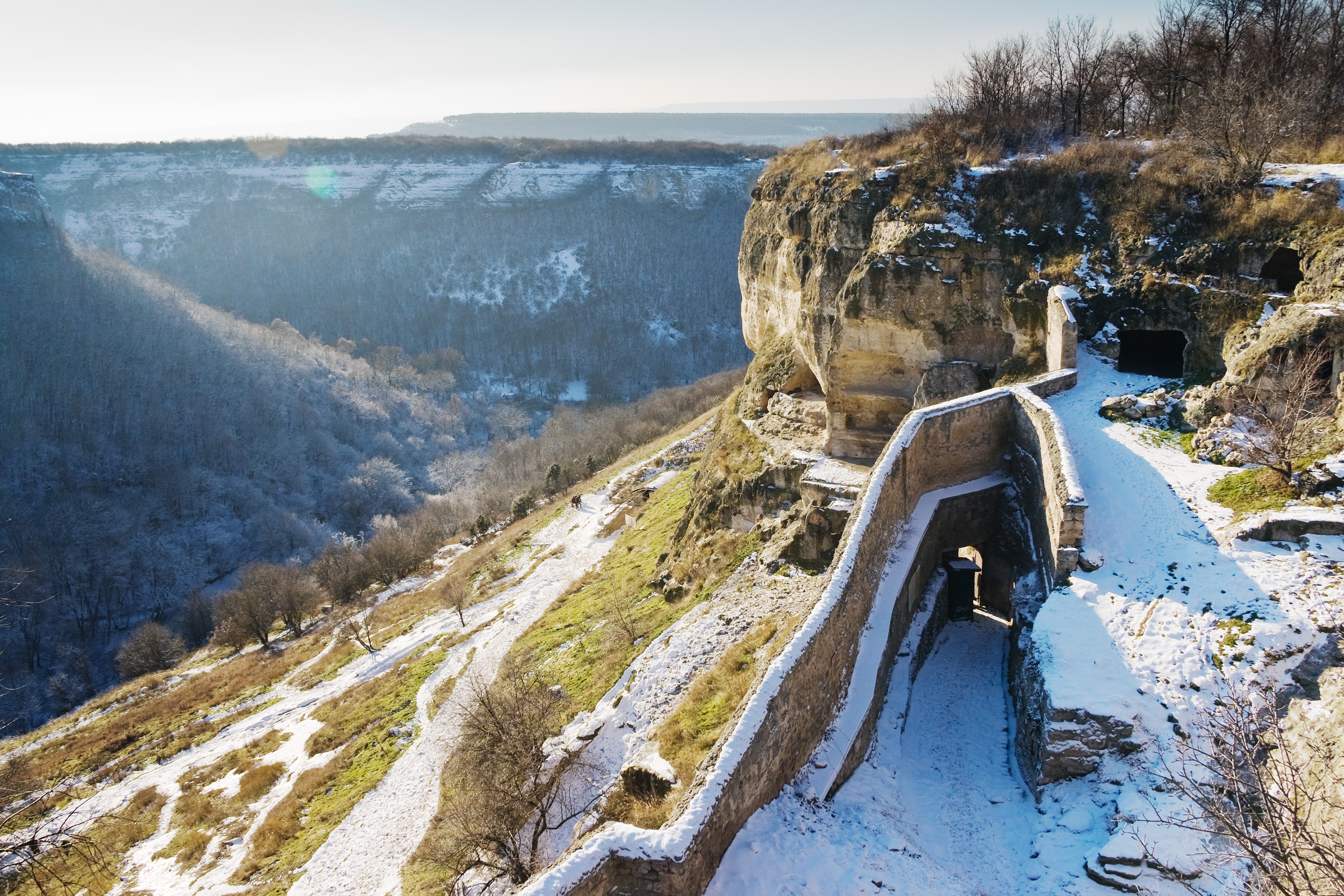

== In fiction ==
"Chufutkale" is mentioned (and also transliterated as "Chew-Foot-Calais") in Vladimir Nabokov's 1968 masterpiece, "Ada", page 338. The novel uses the site for the death of a minor character, Percy de Prey, during an imaginary Second Crimean War in 1888.

It is also mentioned in Jonathan Littel's great book "The kindly Ones" (2006) page 232 and is used to emphasize the regions intricate history.

Adam Mickiewicz wrote a sonnet Droga nad przepaścią w Czufut-Kale (The Pass Across the Abyss in Czufut-Kale), published in 1826.

The second volume of Konstantin Paustovsky's autobiography, _Story of a Life_, contains a description of his visit to Chufut-Kale during World War I. The description occurs in chapter 65, "One Day."

== See also ==
- Karaite Judaism
- Kenesa
- The Valley Of Ghosts
- Mangup
