= Lucky (nickname) =

"Lucky" is the nickname or stage name of:

- Lucky Ali, Indian singer, songwriter and actor Maqsood Mahmood Ali (born 1958)
- Lucky Baldwin (1828–1909), American businessman, investor and real estate speculator
- Eugene B. Fluckey (1913–2007), US Navy rear admiral and World War II submarine commander
- Lucky Gordon, jazz pianist and singer involved in the Profumo Affair political scandal
- Lucky Isibor (born 1977), Nigerian footballer
- Charles Lindbergh (1902–1974), American aviator, author, inventor, explorer and social activist nicknamed "Lucky Lindy"
- Lucky Luciano (1897–1962), Italian-American mobster
- Lucky McDaniel (1925–1986), American marksmanship instructor
- Lucky Millinder (1910–1966), American rhythm and blues and swing bandleader
- Lucky Peterson (1964–2020), American musician
- Lucky Starr (singer), stage name of Leslie William Morrison (born 1940), Australian singer, guitarist and TV presenter
- Lucky Teter (1901–1942), American stunt driver and promoter
- Lucky Thompson (1924-2005), American jazz saxophonist
- Charles Weeghman (1874-1938), one of the founders of the short-lived baseball Federal League
- Lucky Whitehead (born 1992), American football player
- Lucky Yates (born 1967), American actor and comedian

== See also ==
- List of people known as the Lucky
- Lucky (name)
- Doris Ilda Allen (1927–2024), US Army intelligence specialist nicknamed "Lucki"
