= Crimean Khanate =

1441–1783 Crimean Tatar state

Throne of Crimea and Desht-i Kipchak Taht-i Qırım ve Deşt-i Qıpçaq تخت قريم و دشت قپچاق (Crimean Tatar)
- 1441–1783
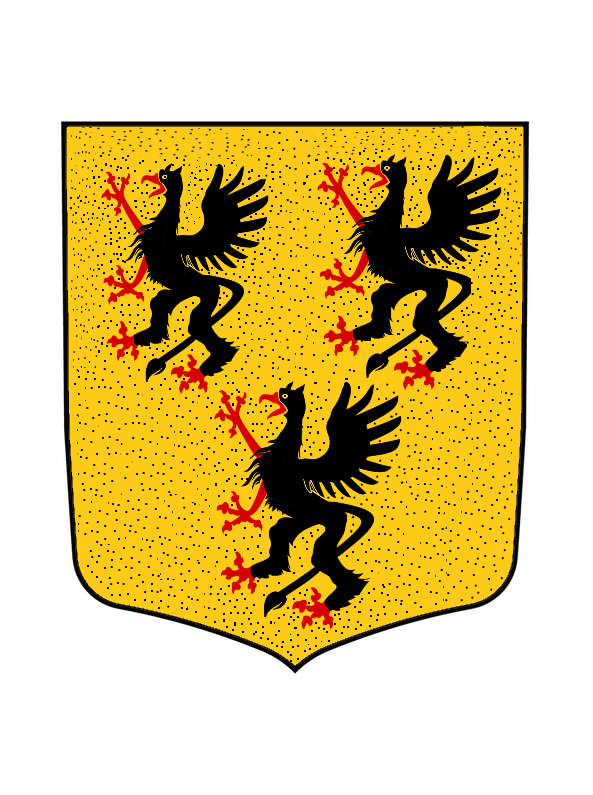
- Flag Coat of arms (17th–18th century)

- The limit of expansion of the Crimean Khanate (Throne of Crimea and Desht-i Kipchak) on the lands of the Ulus of Jochi as of 1523.
- Status: Khanate (Note: De facto independent, de jure vassal of the Ottoman Empire from 1475 to 1774.)
- Capital: Orda-i muazzam Kirkyir; Eski Qırım; Bağçasaray
- Common languages: Kipchak dialects (Crimean Tatar); Ottoman Turkish; Language of literature — Chagatai language
- Religion: Sunni Islam
- Demonym: Crimean
- Government: Elective monarchy
- Khan
  - 1441–1466: Hacı I Giray (first)
  - 1777–1783: Şahin Giray (last)
- History
  - Established: 1441
  - Annexation by the Russian Empire: 1783
- Currency: Akçe, Denga, Manghir, Para, Polushka, Kopeck, Kyrmis
| Preceded by | Succeeded by |
| Golden Horde; Principality of Theodoro | Russian Empire |
- Today part of: Moldova; Russia; Ukraine

The Crimean Khanate, (Note: Crimean Tatar: Qırım Hanlığı, قریم خانلیغی.) self-defined as the Throne of Crimea and Desht-i Kipchak, (Note: Crimean Tatar: Taht-i Qırım ve Deşt-i Qıpçaq, تخت قريم و دشت قپچاق Other names include: Ulu(g) Orda, lit. 'Great Horde'; Ulu(g) yurt, lit. 'Great Yurt'; Qırım yurt, lit. 'Crimean Yurt'.) and in old European historiography and geography known as Little Tartary, (Note: Latin: Tartaria Minor.) was a Crimean Tatar state established by Hacı I Giray existing from 1441 to 1783.

In the first half of the 16th century, the Crimean Khanate reached the height of its power and extended from Bessarabia in the west to the North Caucasus in the east. In one of his diplomatic letters, Mehmed Giray Khan proclaimed himself: "the great khan of the Great Horde, the Qipchaq Steppe, and all the Mongols, padishah Mehmed Giray Khan" and secured recognition of his authority from the Grand Duchy of Moscow and its ruler, Prince Vasili III. Later, he also succeeded in uniting the Crimean, Kazan, and Astrakhan khanates, bringing a significant part of the western lands of the former Jochid Ulus under his control. In addition to the steppe and foothill regions of Crimea proper, the khanate encompassed the lands between the Danube and the Dnieper, the Azov region, and much of present-day Krasnodar Krai in Russia.

In 1783, violating the 1774 Treaty of Küçük Kaynarca (which had guaranteed non-interference of both Russia and the Ottoman Empire in the affairs of the Crimean Khanate), the Russian Empire annexed the khanate. Among the European powers, only France came out with an open protest against this act, due to the longstanding Franco-Ottoman alliance.

== Naming and geography ==
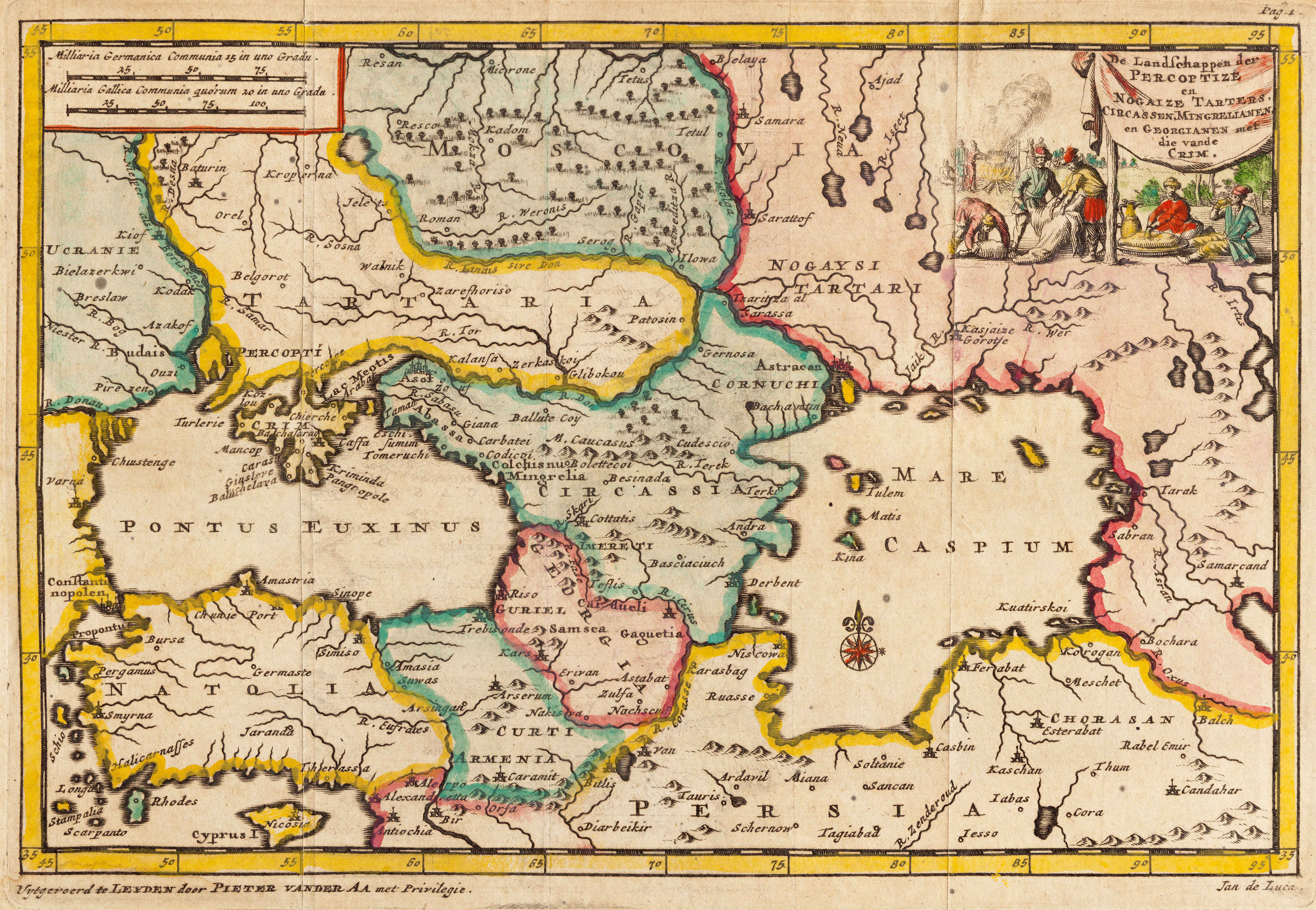
The map of the Crimean Khanate by Pieter van der Aa, 1707

The Crimean Khans, considering their state as the heir and legal successor of the Golden Horde and Desht-i Kipchak, called themselves khans of "the Great Horde, the Great State and the Throne of the Crimea". The full title of the Crimean khans, used in official documents and correspondence with foreign rulers, varying slightly from document to document during the three centuries of the Khanate's existence, was as follows: "By the Grace and help of the blessed and highest Lord, the great padishah of the Great Horde, and the Great State, and the Throne of the Crimea, and all the Nogai, and the mountain Circassians, and the tats and tavgachs, and The Kipchak steppe and all the Tatars" (Crimean Tatar: Tañrı Tebareke ve Ta'alânıñ rahimi ve inayeti milen Uluğ Orda ve Uluğ Yurtnıñ ve taht-ı Qırım ve barça Noğaynıñ ve tağ ara Çerkaçnıñ ve Tat imilen Tavğaçnıñ ve Deşt-i Qıpçaqnıñ ve barça Tatarnıñ uluğ padişahı, تنڭرى تبرك و تعالينيڭ رحمى و عنايتى ميلان اولوغ اوردا و اولوغ يورتنيڭ و تخت قريم و بارچا نوغاينيڭ و طاغ ارا چركاچنيڭ و تاد يميلان طوغاچنيڭ و دشت قپچاقنيڭ و بارچا تاتارنيڭ اولوغ پادشاهى).

According to Oleksa Hayvoronsky, the inhabitants of the Crimean Khanate in Crimean Tatar usually referred to their state as "Qırım yurtu, Crimean Yurt", which can be translated into English as "the country of Crimea" or "Crimean country".

English-speaking writers during the 18th and early 19th centuries often called the territory of the Crimean Khanate and of the Lesser Nogai Horde Little Tartary (or subdivided it as Crim Tartary (also Krim Tartary) and Kuban Tartary). The name "Little Tartary" distinguished the area from (Great) Tartary – those areas of central and northern Asia inhabited by Turkic peoples or Tatars.

The Khanate included the Crimean peninsula and the adjacent steppes, mostly corresponding to parts of South Ukraine between the Dnieper and the Donets rivers (i.e. including most of present-day Zaporizhzhia Oblast, left-Dnipro parts of Kherson Oblast, besides minor parts of southeastern Dnipropetrovsk Oblast and western Donetsk Oblast). The territory controlled by the Crimean Khanate shifted throughout its existence due to the constant incursions by the Cossacks, who had lived along the Don since the disintegration of the Golden Horde in the 15th century. The London-based cartographer Herman Moll in a map of c. 1729 shows the Crimean Khanate as including the Crimean peninsula and the steppe between Dnieper and Mius River as far north as the Dnieper bend and the upper Tor River (a tributary of the Donets).

== History ==
=== Pre-history ===
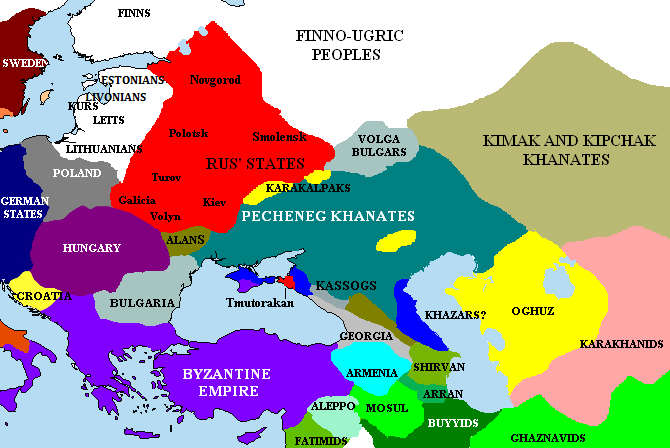
The Pontic steppes, c. 1015

The first known Turkic peoples appeared in Crimea in the 6th century, during the conquest of the Crimea by the Göktürk Empire. In the 11th century, Cumans (Kipchaks) appeared in Crimea; they later became the ruling and state-forming people of the Golden Horde and the Crimean Khanate. In the middle of the 13th century, the northern steppe lands of the Crimea, inhabited mainly by Turkic peoples (Cumans), became the possession of Ulus Juchi, known as the Golden Horde or Ulu Ulus. In this era, the role of Turkic peoples increased. Around this time, the local Kipchaks took the name of Tatars.

In the Horde period, the khans of the Golden Horde were the supreme rulers of the Crimea, but their governors–Emirs–exercised direct control. The first formally recognized ruler in the Crimea is considered Aran-Timur, the nephew of Batu Khan of the Golden Horde, who received this area from Mengu-Timur, and the first center of the Crimea was the ancient city Qırım (Solhat). This name then gradually spread to the entire Peninsula. The second center of Crimea was the valley adjacent to Qırq Yer and Bağçasaray.

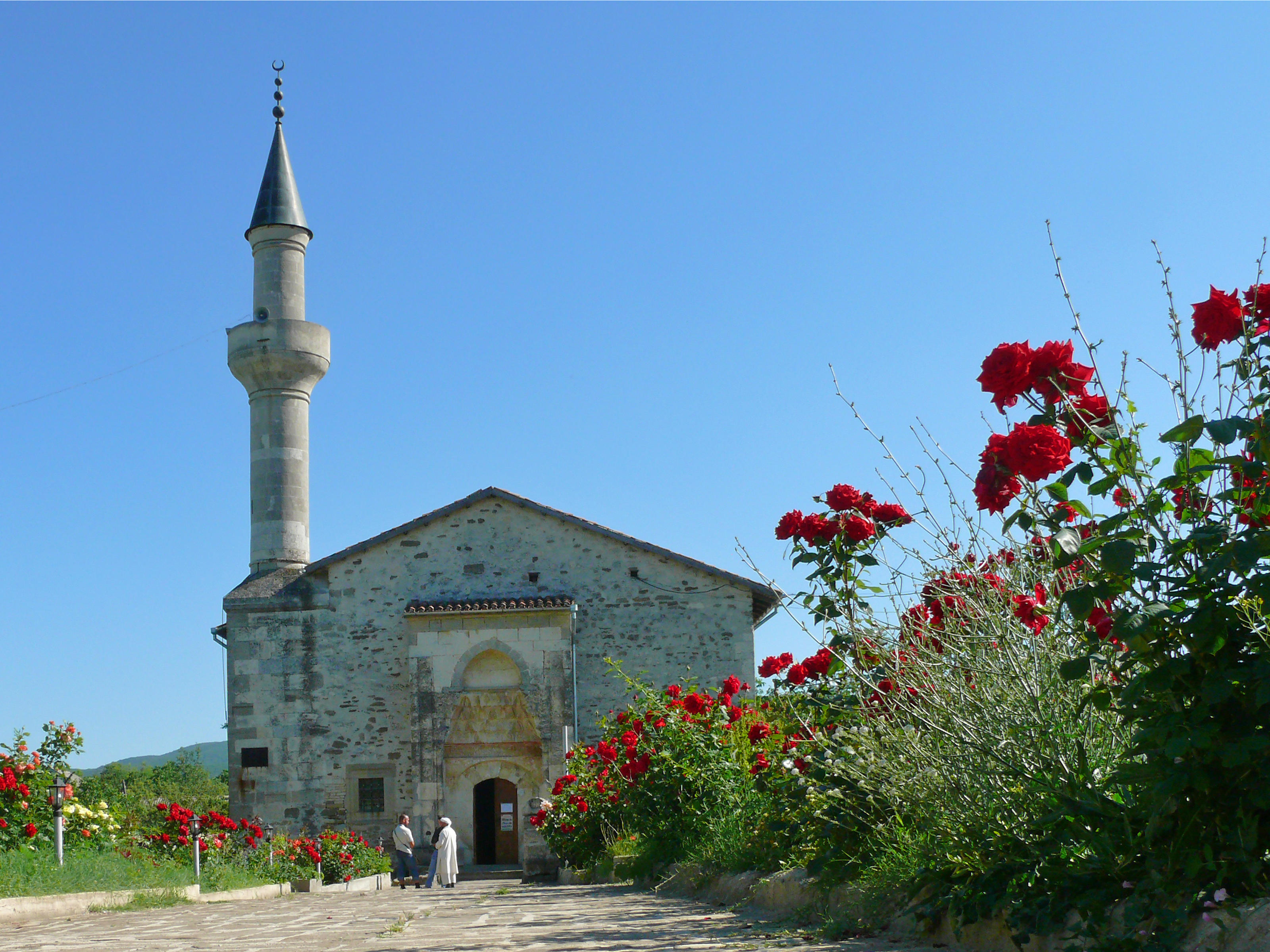
Uzbek Khan Mosque in Eski Qırım (Solhat), built in the Golden Horde period

The multi-ethnic population of Crimea then consisted mainly of those who lived in the steppe and foothills of the Peninsula: Kipchaks (Cumans), Ukrainian Greeks, Crimean Goths, Alans, and Armenians, who lived mainly in cities and mountain villages. The Crimean nobility was mostly of both Kipchak and Horden origin.

Horde rule for the peoples who inhabited the Crimean Peninsula was, in general, painful. The rulers of the Golden Horde repeatedly organized punitive campaigns in the Crimea when the local population refused to pay tribute. An example is the well-known campaign of the Nogai Khan in 1299, which resulted in a number of Crimean cities suffering. As in other regions of the Horde, separatist tendencies soon began to manifest themselves in Crimea.

In 1303, in Crimea, the most famous written monument of the Kypchak or Cuman language was created (named in Kypchak "tatar tili") – "Codex Cumanicus", which is the oldest memorial in the Crimean Tatar language and of great importance for the history of Kypchak and Oghuz dialects – as directly related to the Kipchaks of the Black Sea steppes and Crimea.

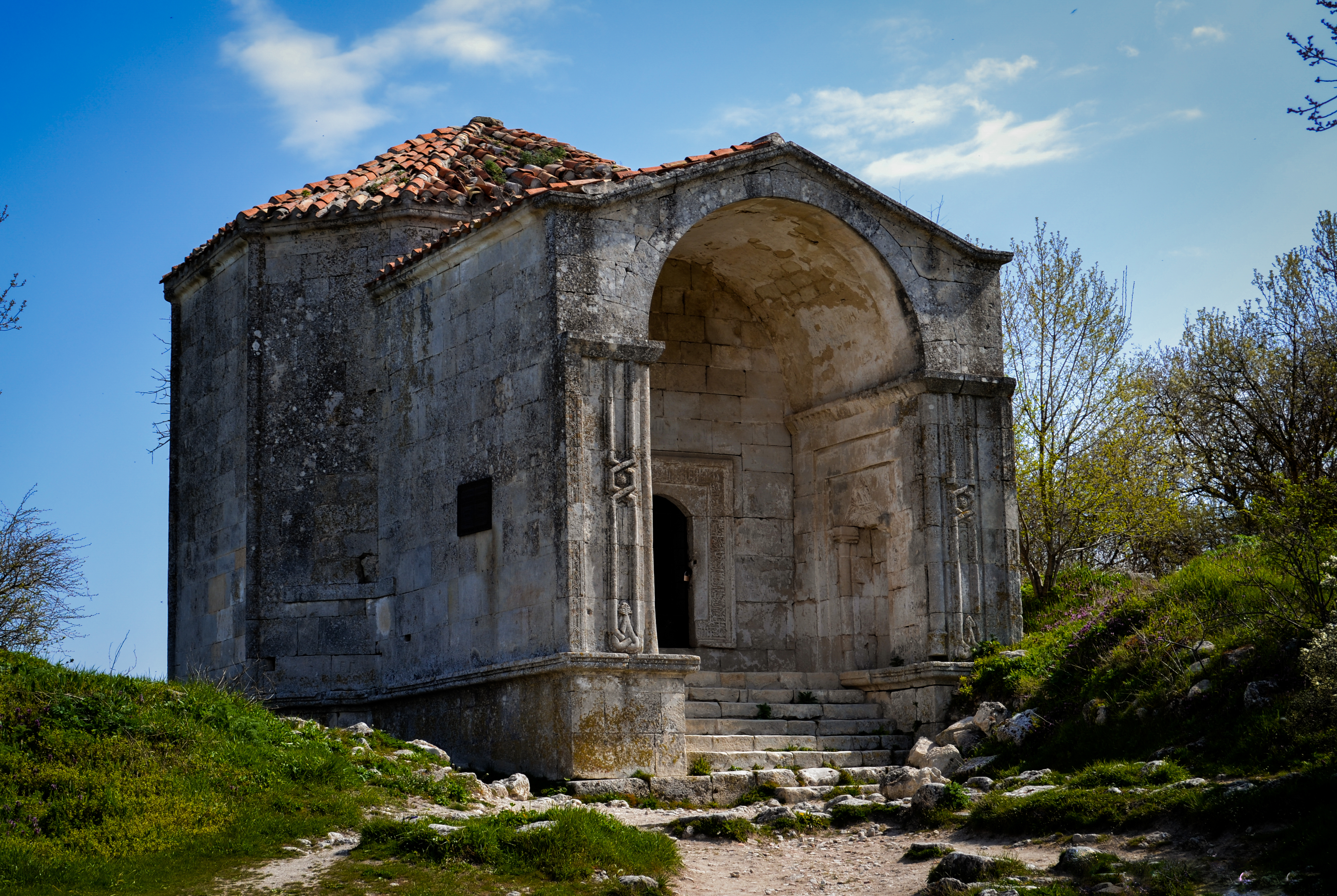
Dürbe of Canike Hanım

There are legends that, in the 14th century, the Crimea was repeatedly ravaged by the army of the Grand Duchy of Lithuania. Grand Duke of Lithuania Algirdas broke the Tatar army in 1363 near the mouth of the Dnieper, and then invaded the Crimea, devastated Chersonesos and seized valuable church objects there. There is a similar legend about his successor Vytautas, who in 1397 went on a Crimean campaign to Caffa and again destroyed Chersonesos. Vytautas is also known in Crimean history for giving refuge in the Grand Duchy of Lithuania to a significant number of Tatars and Karaites, whose descendants now live in Lithuania and Belarus. In 1399, Vytautas, who came to the aid of the Horde Khan Tokhtamysh, was defeated on the banks of the Vorskla River by Tokhtamysh's rival Timur-Kutluk, on whose behalf the Horde was ruled by the Emir Edigei, and made peace.

During the reign of Canike Hanım, Tokhtamysh's daughter, in Qırq-Or, she supported Hacı I Giray in the struggle against the descendants of Tokhtamysh, Kichi-Muhammada, and Sayid Ahmad, who as well as Hacı Giray claimed full power in the Crimea and probably saw him as her heir to the Crimean throne. In the sources of the 16th–18th centuries, the opinion according to which the separation of the Crimean Tatar state was raised to Tokhtamysh, and Canike was the most important figure in this process, completely prevailed.

=== Establishment ===
The Crimean Khanate originated in the early 15th century when certain clans of the Golden Horde ceased their nomadic life in the Desht-i Kipchak (Kypchak Steppes of today's Ukraine and southern Russia) and decided to make Crimea their yurt (homeland). At that time, the Golden Horde of the Mongol Empire had governed the Crimean peninsula as an ulus since 1239, with its capital at Qirim (Staryi Krym). The local separatists invited a Genghisid contender for the Golden Horde throne, Hacı Giray, to become their khan. Hacı Giray accepted their invitation and travelled from exile in Lithuania. He warred for independence against the Horde from 1420 to 1441, in the end achieving success. But Hacı Giray then had to fight off internal rivals before he could ascend the throne of the khanate in 1449, after which he moved its capital to Qırq Yer (today part of Bahçeseray). The khanate included the Crimean Peninsula (except the south and southwest coast and ports, controlled by the Republic of Genoa & Trebizond Empire) as well as the adjacent steppe.

=== Ottoman protectorate ===
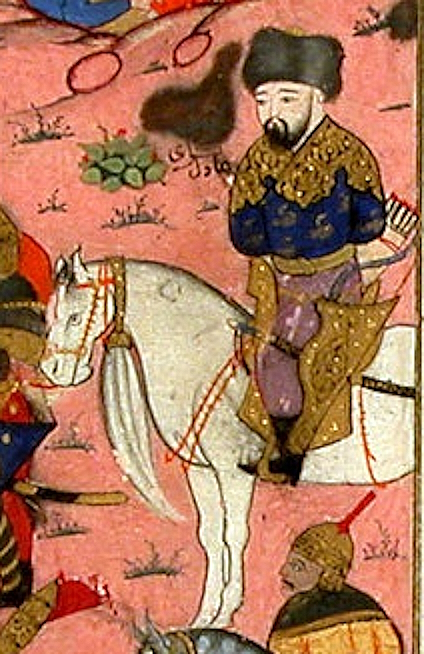
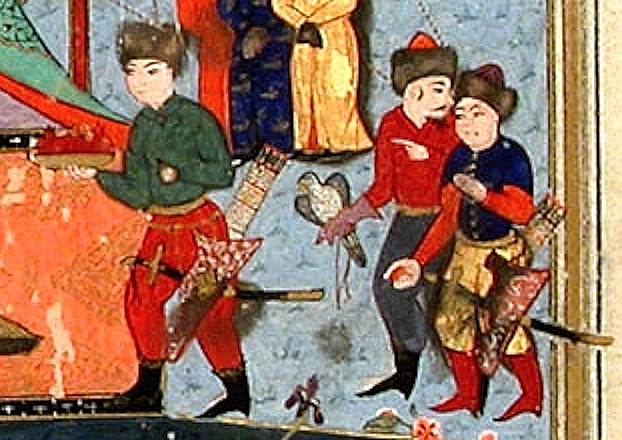
Crimean Khanate commander Adil Giray on horse, and Crimean Khanate soldiers at camp, in 1578. Şeca'atname (1586)

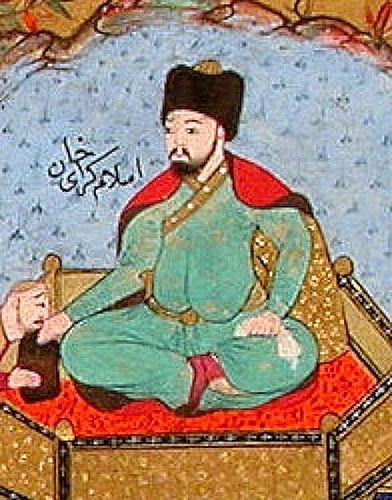
İslâm II Giray Khan ("اسلام گيرای خان") enthroned (ruled 1584-88). Secaatname (1586)

The sons of Hacı I Giray contended against each other to succeed him. The Ottomans intervened and installed one of the sons, Meñli I Giray, on the throne. Menli I Giray, took the imperial title "Sovereign of Two Continents and Khan of Khans of Two Seas."

In 1475 the Ottoman forces, under the command of Gedik Ahmet Pasha, conquered the Greek Principality of Theodoro and the Genoese colonies at Cembalo, Soldaia, and Caffa (modern Feodosiya). Thenceforth the khanate was a protectorate of the Ottoman Empire. The Ottoman sultan enjoyed veto power over the selection of new Crimean khans. The Empire annexed the Crimean coast but recognized the legitimacy of the khanate rule of the steppes, as the khans were descendants of Genghis Khan.

In 1475, the Ottomans imprisoned Meñli I Giray for three years for resisting the invasion. After returning from captivity in Constantinople, he accepted the suzerainty of the Ottoman Empire. The khans continued to have a foreign policy independent from the Ottomans in the steppes of Little Tartary. The khans continued to mint coins and use their names in Friday prayers, two important signs of sovereignty. They did not pay tribute to the Ottoman Empire; instead the Ottomans paid them in return for their services of providing skilled outriders and frontline cavalry in their campaigns. Later on, Crimea lost power in this relationship as the result of a crisis in 1523, during the reign of Meñli's successor, Mehmed I Giray. He died that year and beginning with his successor, from 1524 on, Crimean khans were appointed by the Sultan. The alliance of the Crimean Tatars and the Ottomans was comparable to the Polish–Lithuanian union in its importance and durability. The Crimean cavalry became indispensable for the Ottomans' campaigns against Poland, Hungary, and Persia.

=== Victory over the Golden Horde ===
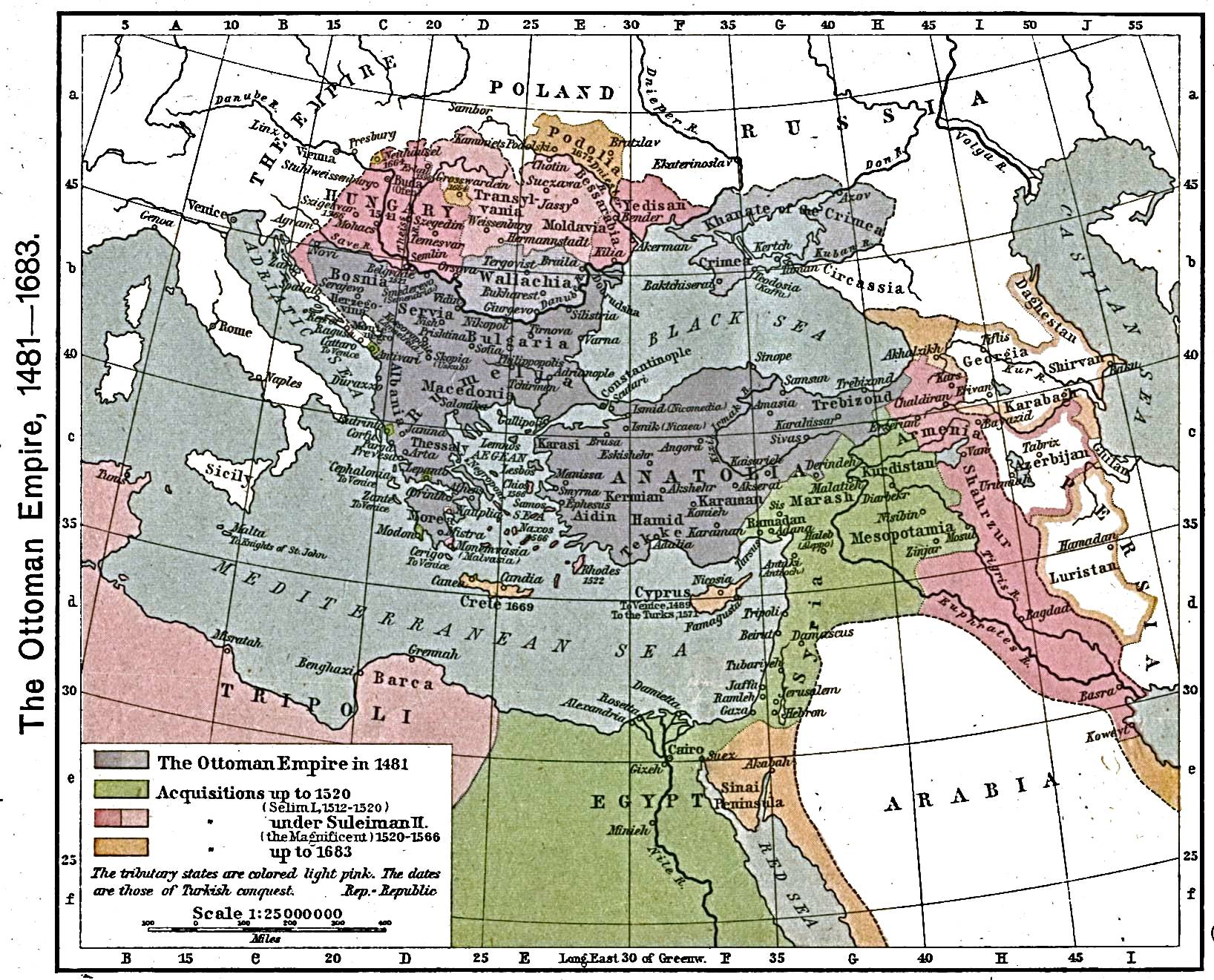
Map of the Crimean Khanate and the Ottoman Empire

In 1502, Meñli I Giray defeated the last khan of the Great Horde, which put an end to the Horde's claims on Crimea. The Khanate initially chose as its capital Salaçıq near the Qırq Yer fortress. Later, the capital was moved a short distance to Bahçeseray, founded in 1532 by Sahib I Giray. Both Salaçıq and the Qırq Yer fortress today are part of the expanded city of Bahçeseray.

=== Slave trade ===
The slave trade was the backbone of the economy of the Crimean Khanate.

The Crimeans frequently mounted raids into the Danubian principalities, Poland–Lithuania, and Muscovy to enslave people whom they could capture; for each captive, the khan received a fixed share (savğa) of 10% or 20%. These campaigns by Crimean forces were either sefers ("sojourns"), officially declared military operations led by the khans themselves, or çapuls ("despoiling"), raids undertaken by groups of noblemen, sometimes illegally because they contravened treaties concluded by the khans with neighbouring rulers.

For a long time, until the early 18th century, the khanate maintained a massive slave trade with the Ottoman Empire and the Middle East, exporting about 2 million slaves from Russia and Poland–Lithuania over the period 1500–1700, mainly into the Ottoman Empire. Caffa, an Ottoman city on the Crimean peninsula (and thus not part of the khanate), was one of the best known significant trading ports and slave markets. In 1769, a last major Tatar raid resulted in the capture of 20,000 Russian and Ruthenian slaves.

Author and historian Brian Glyn Williams writes:

Fisher estimates that in the sixteenth century the Polish–Lithuanian Commonwealth lost around 20,000 individuals a year and that from 1474 to 1694, as many as a million Commonwealth citizens were carried off into Crimean slavery.

Early modern sources are full of descriptions of sufferings of Christian slaves captured by the Crimean Tatars in the course of their raids:

It seems that the position and everyday conditions of a slave depended largely on his/her owner. Some slaves indeed could spend the rest of their days doing exhausting labor: as the Crimean vizir (minister) Sefer Gazi Aga mentions in one of his letters, the slaves were often "a plough and a scythe" of their owners. Most terrible, perhaps, was the fate of those who became galley-slaves, whose sufferings were poeticized in many Ukrainian dumas (songs). ... Both female and male slaves were often used for sexual purposes.

=== Alliances and conflicts with Poland and Zaporozhian Cossacks ===
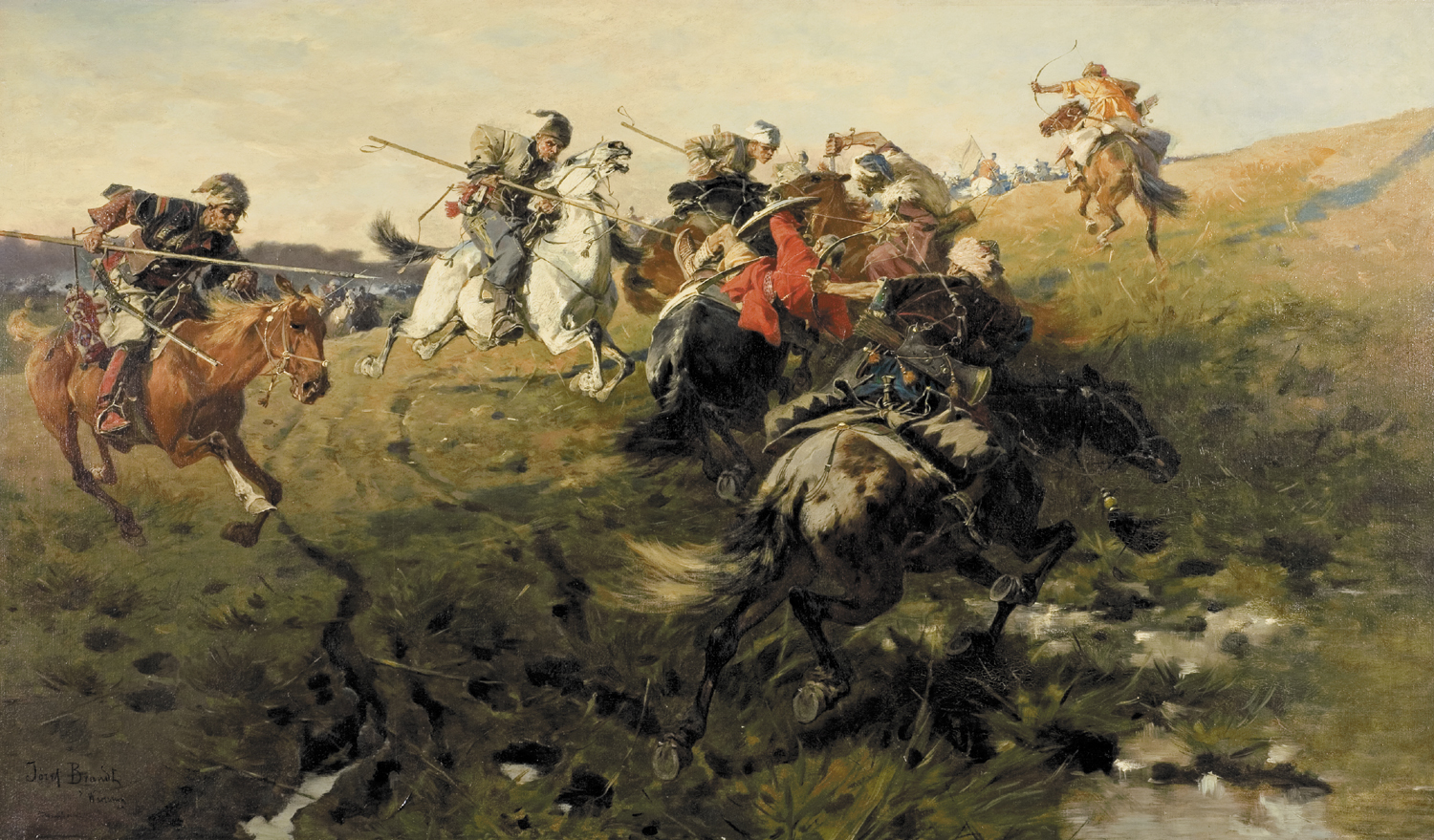
Tatars fighting Zaporozhian Cossacks, by Józef Brandt

The Crimeans had a complex relationship with Zaporozhian Cossacks who lived to the north of the khanate in modern Ukraine. The Cossacks provided a measure of protection against Tatar raids for Poland–Lithuania and received subsidies for their service. They also raided Crimean and Ottoman possessions in the region. At times Crimean Khanate made alliances with the Polish–Lithuanian Commonwealth and the Zaporizhian Sich. The assistance of İslâm III Giray during the Khmelnytsky Uprising in 1648 contributed greatly to the initial momentum of military successes for the Cossacks. The relationship with the Polish–Lithuanian Commonwealth was also exclusive, as it was the home dynasty of the Girays, who sought sanctuary in Lithuania in the 15th century before establishing themselves on the Crimean Peninsula.

=== Struggle with Muscovy ===
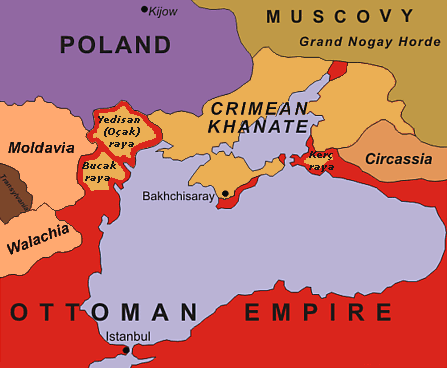
The Crimean Khanate in about 1600. Note that the areas marked Poland and Muscovy were claimed rather than administered and were thinly populated.

In the middle of the 16th century, the Crimean Khanate asserted a claim to be the successor to the Golden Horde, which entailed asserting the right of rule over the Tatar khanates of the Caspian-Volga region, particularly the Kazan Khanate and Astrakhan Khanate. This claim pitted it against Muscovy for dominance in the region. A successful campaign by Devlet I Giray upon the Russian capital in 1571 culminated in the burning of Moscow, and he thereby gained the sobriquet, That Alğan (seizer of the throne). The following year, however, the Crimean Khanate lost access to the Volga once and for all due to its catastrophic defeat in the Battle of Molodi.

Don Cossacks reached lower Don, Donets and Azov by the 1580s and thus became the north-eastern neighbours of the khanate. They attracted peasants, serfs and gentry fleeing internal conflicts, over-population and intensifying exploitation. Just as Zaporozhians protected the southern borders of the Commonwealth, Don Cossacks protected Muscovy and themselves attacked the khanate and Ottoman fortresses.

=== Relationship with Nogais ===
At the beginning of the 17th century, the ancestors of the Kalmyks, the Oirat Mongols, migrated from the steppes of Central Asia to the Lower Volga region. They reached the Volga about 1630. That land, however, was not uncontested pasture, but rather the homeland of the Nogai Horde. Large groups of Nogais fled southeast to the northern Caucasian plain and west to the Black Sea steppe, lands claimed by the Crimean Khanate.

The Nogais north of the Black Sea were nominally subject to the Crimean Khanate. They were divided into the following groups: Budjak (from the Danube to the Dniester), Yedisan (from the Dniester to the Bug), Jamboyluk (Bug to Crimea), Yedickul (north of Crimea), and Kuban.

=== Relationship with Circassians ===
Under the influence of the Crimean Tatars and of the Ottoman Empire, large numbers of Circassians converted to Islam. Circassian mercenaries and recruits played an important role in the khan's armies, khans often married Circassian women and it was a custom for young Crimean princes to spend time in Circassia training in the art of warfare. Several conflicts occurred between Circassians and Crimean Tatars in the 18th century, with the former defeating an army of Khan Kaplan Giray and Ottoman auxiliaries in the battle of Kanzhal.

=== Decline ===
The Turkish traveler writer Evliya Çelebi mentions the impact of Cossack raids from Azak upon the territories of the Crimean Khanate. These raids ruined trade routes and severely depopulated many important regions. By the time Evliya Çelebi had arrived almost all the towns he visited were affected by the Cossack raids. In fact, the only place Evliya Çelebi considered safe from the Cossacks was the Ottoman fortress at Arabat.

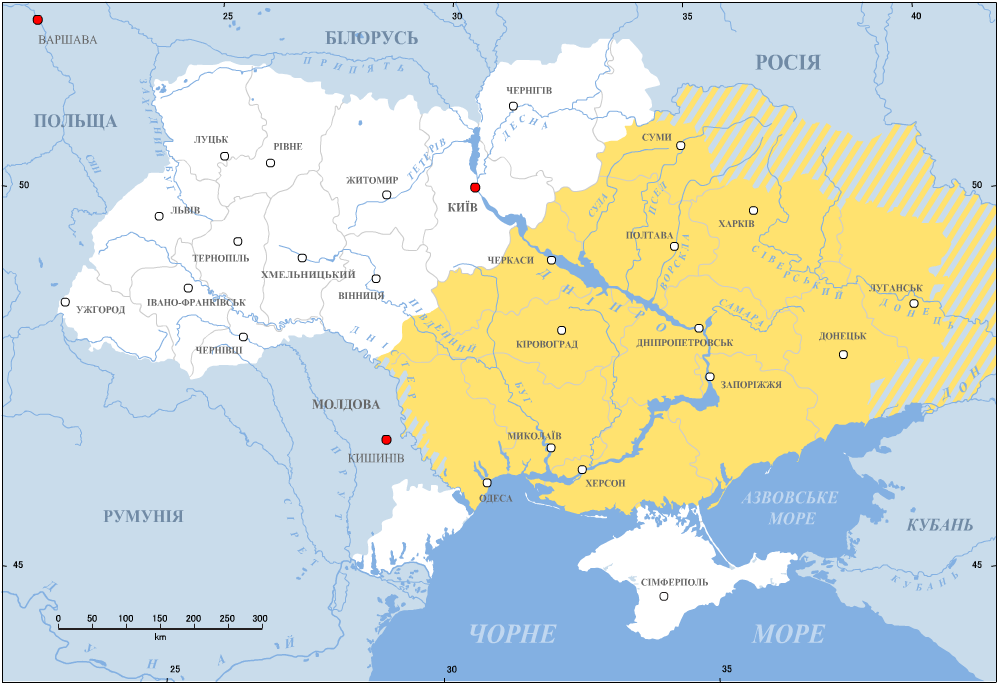
Map of the sparsely populated Wild Fields in the 17th century

The decline of the Crimean Khanate was a consequence of the weakening of the Ottoman Empire and a change in Eastern Europe's balance of power favouring its neighbours. Crimean Tatars often returned from Ottoman campaigns without loot, and Ottoman subsidies were less likely for unsuccessful campaigns. Without sufficient guns, the Tatar cavalry suffered a significant loss against European and Russian armies with modern equipment. By the late 17th century, Russia became too strong for Crimean Khan to pillage and the Treaty of Karlowitz (1699) outlawed further raids. The era of great slave raids in Russia and Ukraine was over, although brigands and Nogay raiders continued their attacks, and consequently Russian hatred of the Crimean Khanate did not decrease. These politico-economic losses led in turn to erosion of the khan's support among noble clans, and internal conflicts for power ensued. The Nogays, who provided a significant portion of the Crimean military forces, also took back their support from the khans towards the end of the empire.

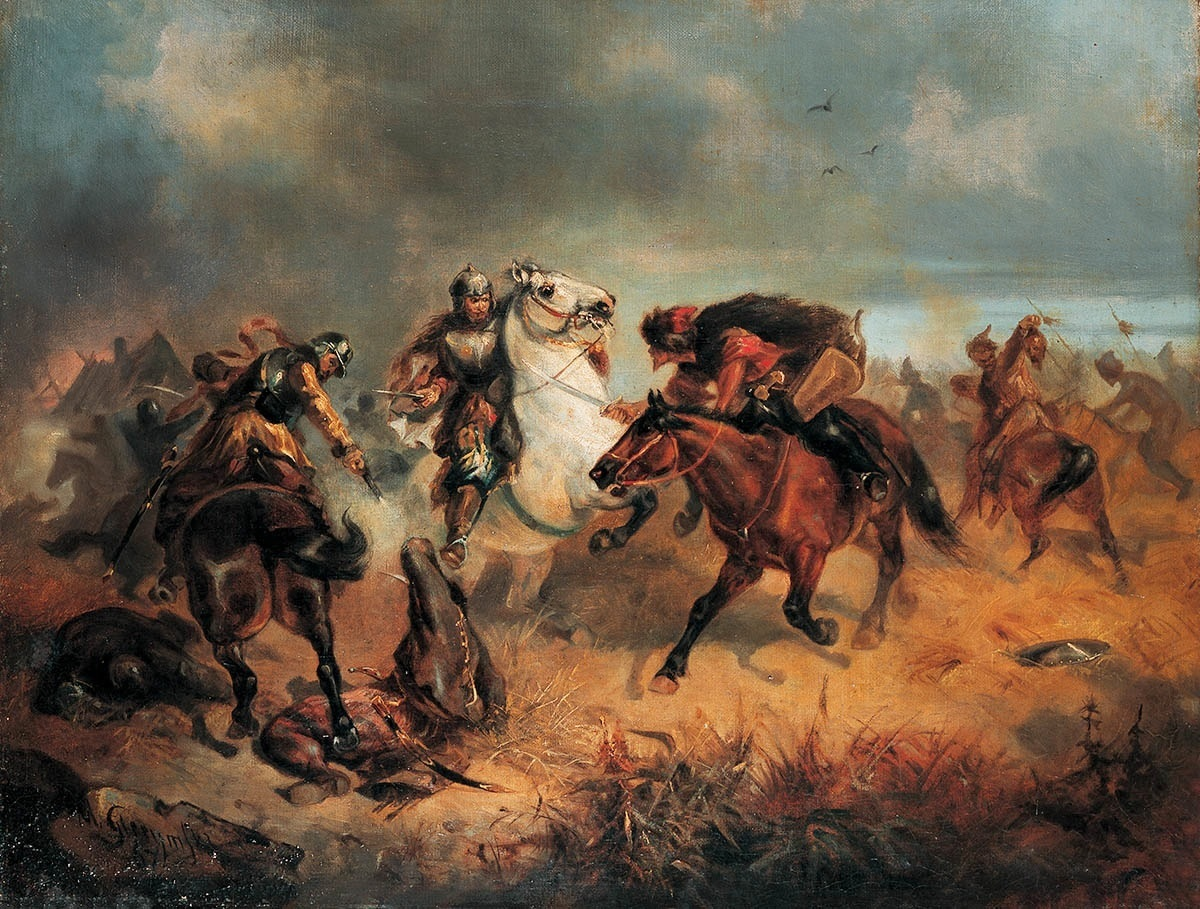
Skirmish with Tatars, by Maksymilian Gierymski

In the first half of the 17th century, Kalmyks formed the Kalmyk Khanate in the Lower Volga and under Ayuka Khan conducted many military expeditions against the Crimean Khanate and Nogays. By becoming an important ally and later part of the Russian Empire and taking an oath to protect its southeastern borders, the Kalmyk Khanate took an active part in all Russian war campaigns in the 17th and 18th centuries, providing up to 40,000 fully equipped horsemen.

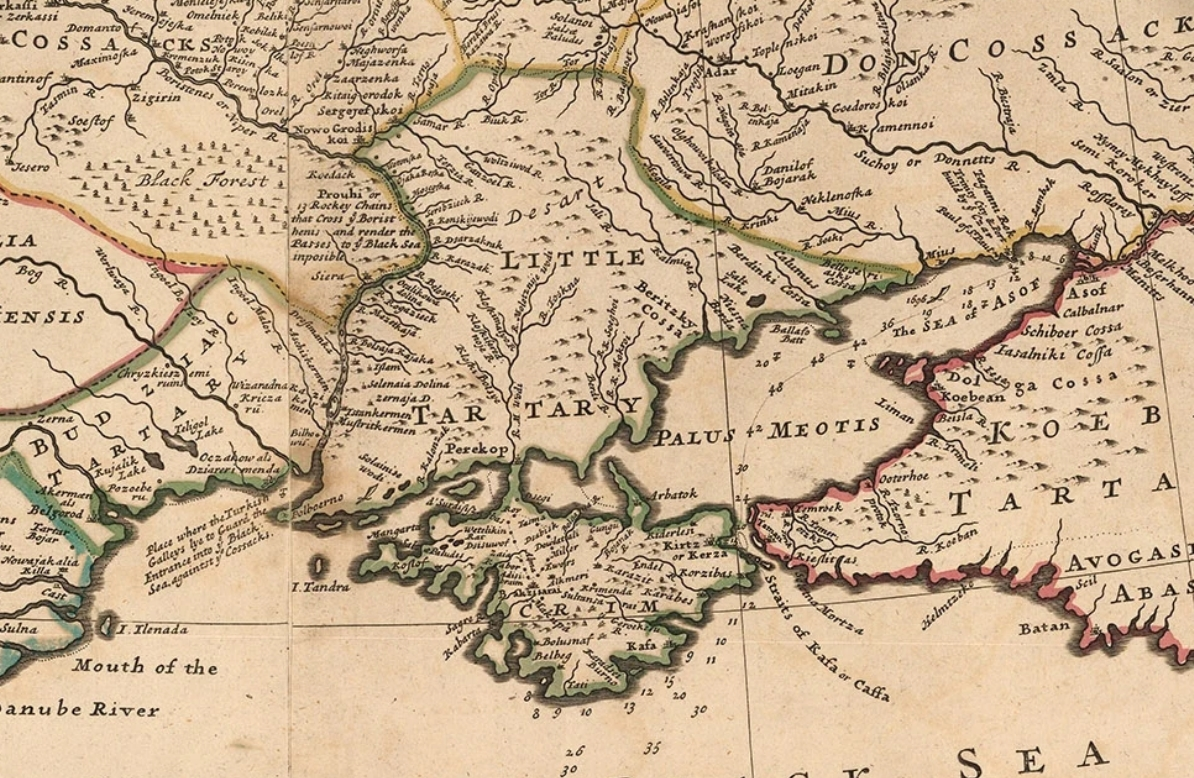
Little Tartary (Crimean Khanate) borders in 1715 (Herman Moll)

The united Russian and Ukrainian forces attacked the Crimean Khanate during the Chigirin campaigns and the Crimean campaigns. It was during the Russo-Turkish War (1735–1739) that the Russians, under the command of Field-Marshal Münnich, penetrated the Crimean Peninsula itself, burning and destroying everything in it.

More warfare ensued during the reign of Catherine II. The Russo-Turkish War (1768–1774) resulted in the Treaty of Kuchuk-Kainarji, which made the Crimean Khanate independent from the Ottoman Empire and aligned it with the Russian Empire.

The rule of the last Crimean khan Şahin Giray was marked with increasing Russian influence and outbursts of violence from the khan administration towards internal opposition. On 8 April 1783, in violation of the treaty (after some parts of treaty had been already violated by Crimeans and Ottomans), Catherine II intervened in the civil war, de facto annexing the whole peninsula as the Taurida Oblast. In 1787, Şahin Giray took refuge in the Ottoman Empire and was eventually executed, on Rhodes, by the Ottoman authorities for betrayal. The royal Giray family survives to this day.

Through the 1792 Treaty of Jassy (Iaşi), the Russian frontier was extended to the Dniester River and the takeover of Yedisan was complete. The 1812 Treaty of Bucharest transferred Bessarabia to Russian control.

== Government ==
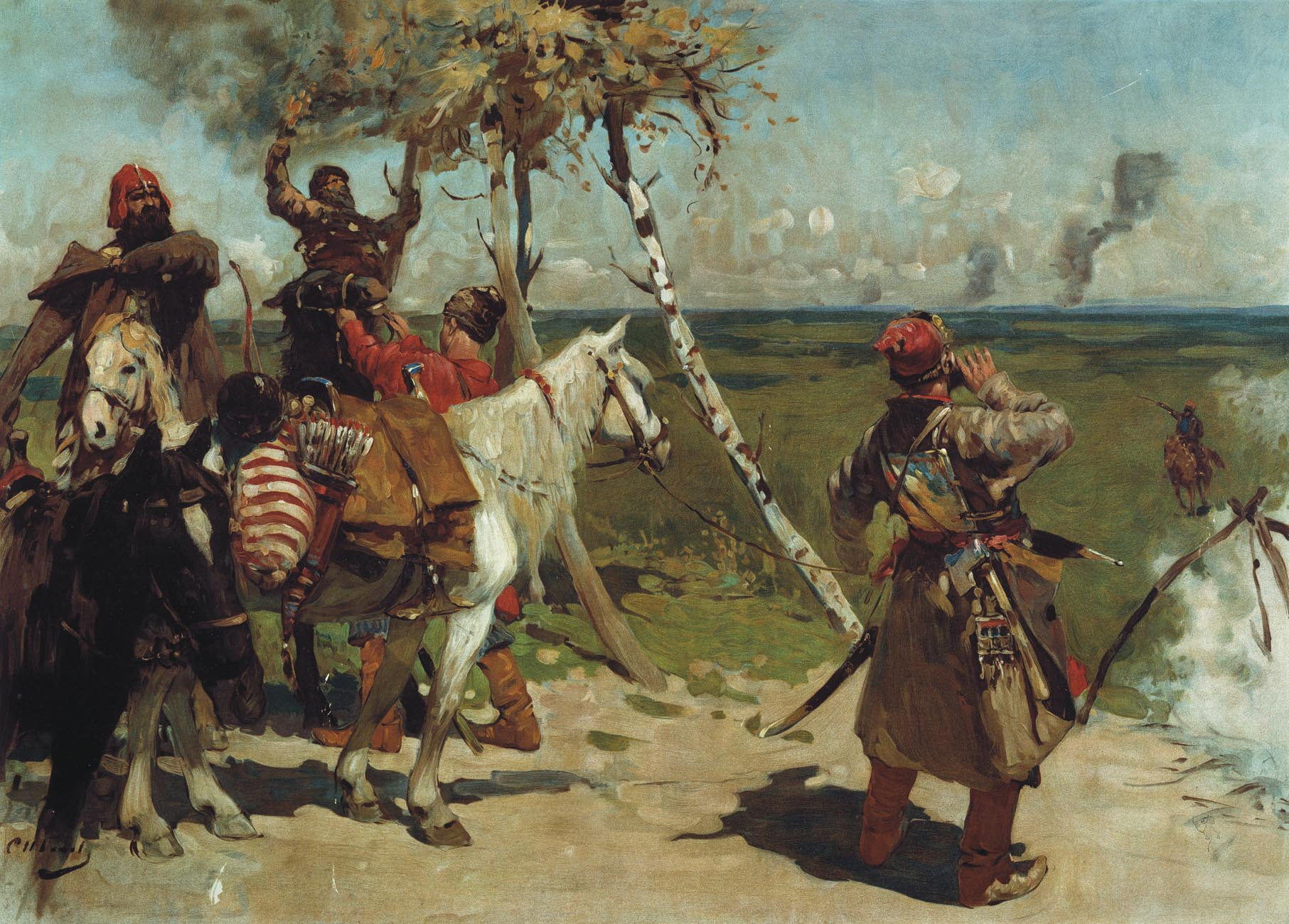
At the Southern Border of Moscva state by Sergey Vasilievich Ivanov

All Khans were from the Giray clan, which traced its right to rule to its descent from Genghis Khan. According to the tradition of the steppes, the ruler was legitimate only if he was of Genghisid royal descent (i.e. "ak süyek"). Although the Giray dynasty was the symbol of government, the khan actually governed with the participation of Qaraçı Beys, the leaders of the noble clans such as Şirin, Barın, Arğın, Qıpçaq, and in the later period, Mansuroğlu and Sicavut. After the collapse of the Astrakhan Khanate in 1556, an important element of the Crimean Khanate were the Nogays, most of whom transferred their allegiance from Astrakhan to Crimea. Circassians (Atteghei) and Cossacks also occasionally played roles in Crimean politics, alternating their allegiance between the khan and the beys. The Nogay pastoral nomads north of the Black Sea were nominally subject to the Crimean Khan. They were divided into the following groups: Budjak (from the Danube to the Dniester), Yedisan (from the Dniester to the Bug), Cemboylıq (Bug to Crimea), Yedickul (north of Crimea) and Kuban.

=== Internal affairs ===
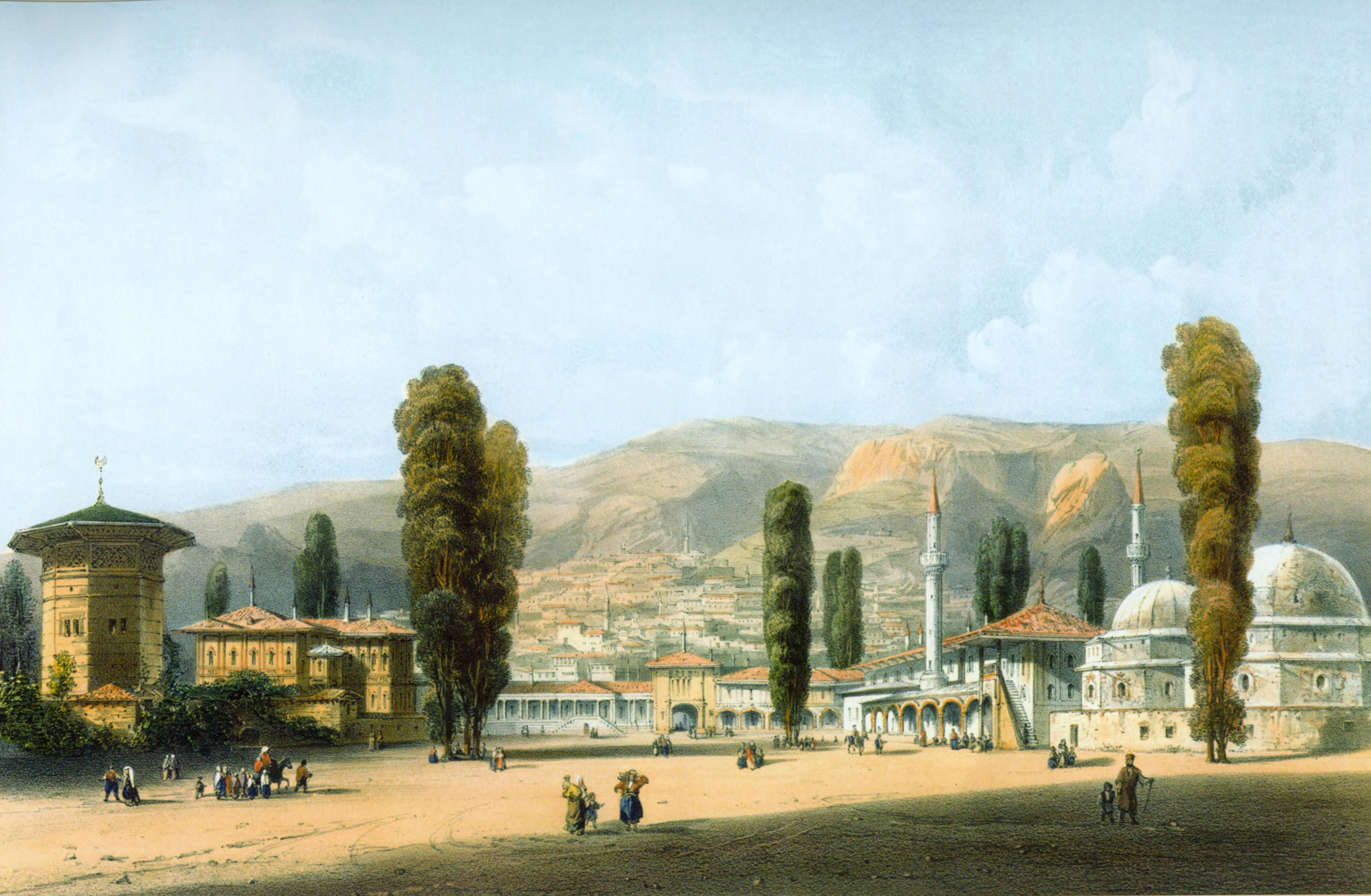
Khan Qirim Girai, is known to have authorized the construction of many landmarks in Bakhchysarai and the Crimean Khanate.

Internally, the khanate territory was divided among the beys, and beneath the beys were mirzas from noble families. The relationship of peasants or herdsmen to their mirzas was not feudal. They were free and the Islamic law protected them from losing their rights. Apportioned by village, the land was worked in common and taxes were assigned to the whole village. The tax was one tenth of an agricultural product, one twentieth of a herd animal, and a variable amount of unpaid labor. During the reforms by the last khan Şahin Giray, the internal structure was changed following the Turkish pattern: the nobles' landholdings were proclaimed the domain of the khan and reorganized into qadılıqs (provinces governed by representatives of the khan).

=== Crimean law ===
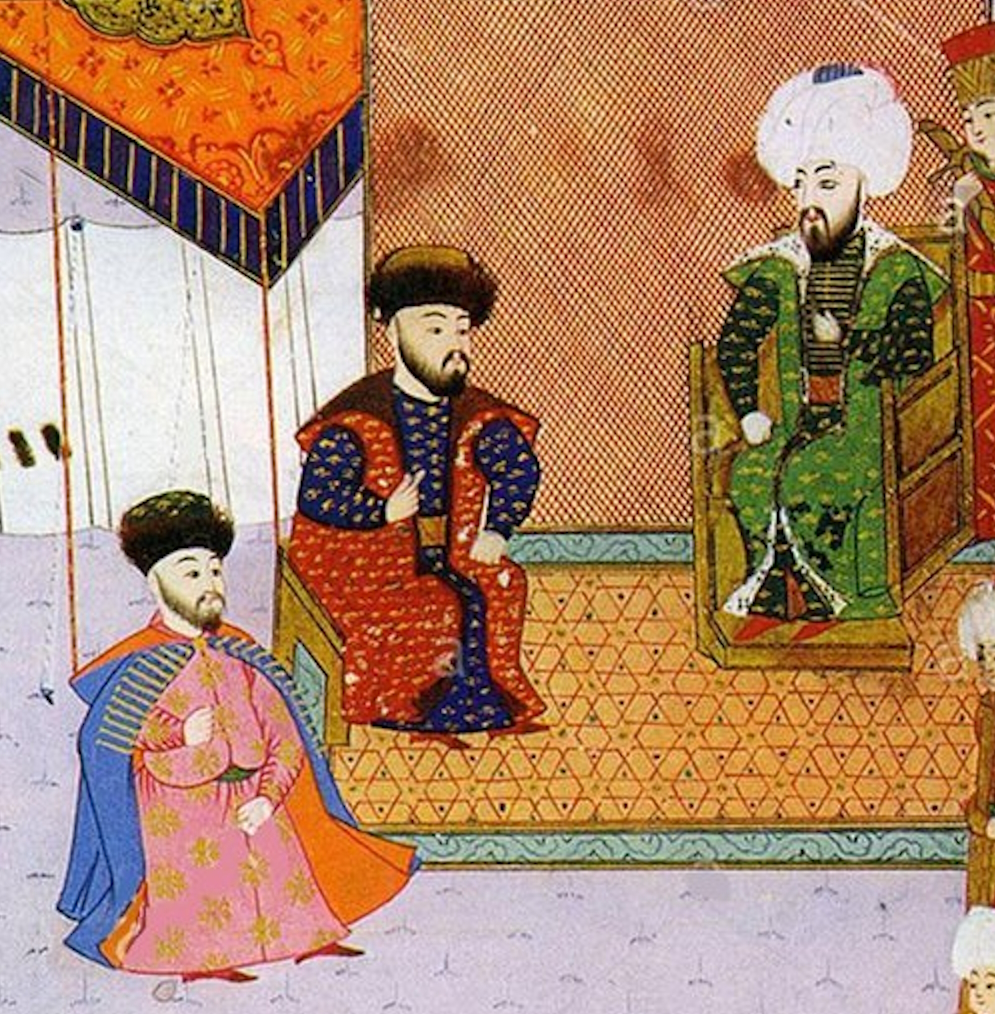
Meñli I Giray at the court of Ottoman sultan Bayezid II. Hünername

Crimean law was based on Tatar law, Islamic law, and, in limited matters, Ottoman law. The leader of the Muslim establishment was the mufti, who was selected from among the local Muslim clergy. His major duty was neither judicial nor theological, but financial. The mufti's administration controlled all of the vakif lands and their enormous revenues. Another Muslim official, appointed not by the clergy but the Ottoman sultan, was the kadıasker, the overseer of the khanate's judicial districts, each under jurisdiction of a kadi. In theory, kadis answered to the kadiaskers, but in practice they answered to the clan leaders and the khan. The kadis determined the day to day legal behavior of Muslims in the khanate.

=== Non-Muslim minorities ===
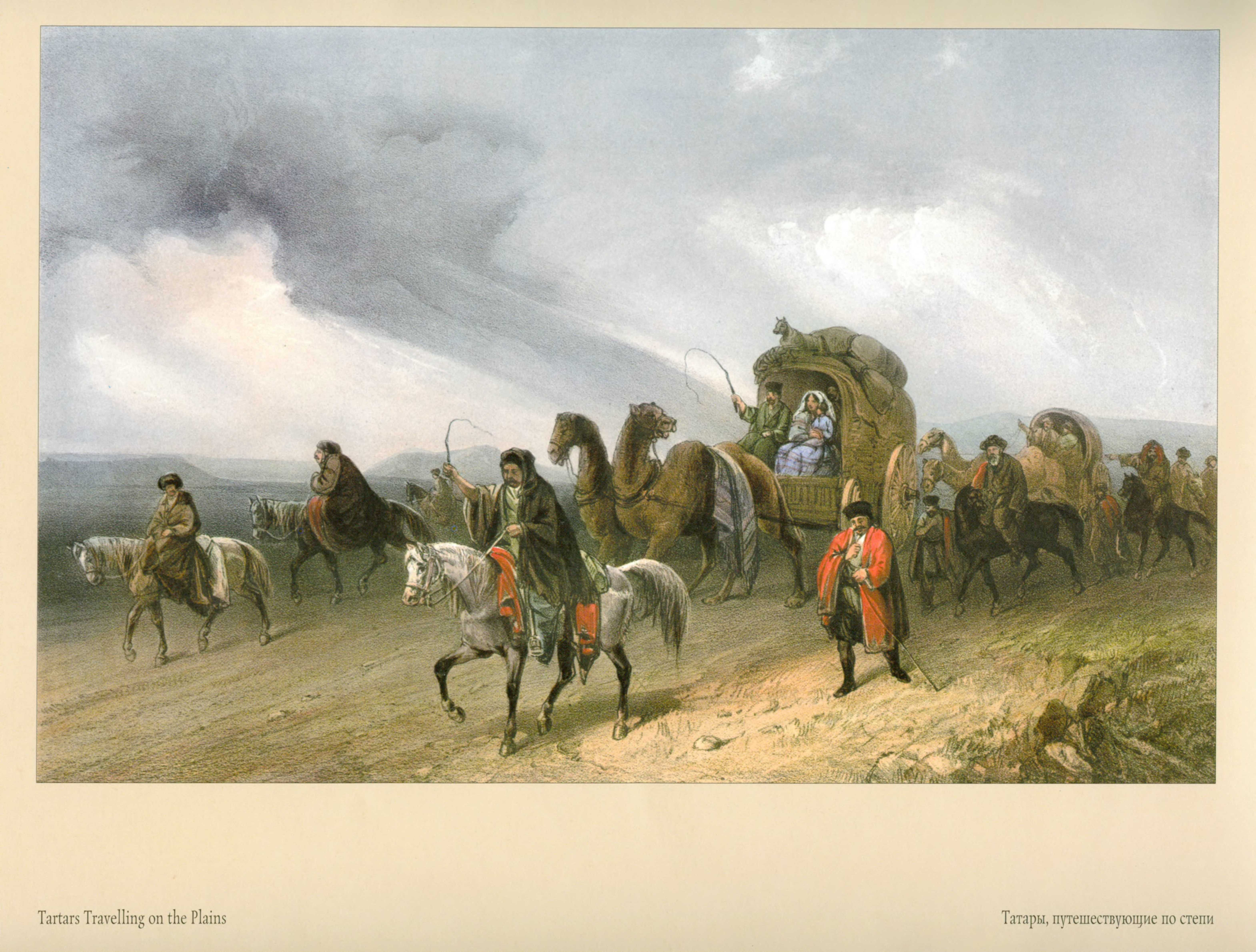
"Crimean Tatars travelling on the plains" by Carlo Bossoli

Substantial non-Muslim minorities – Greeks, Armenians, Crimean Goths, Adyghe (Circassians), Venetians, Genoese, Crimean Karaites, and Qırımçaq Jews – lived principally in the cities, mostly in separate districts or suburbs. Under the millet system, they had their own religious and judicial institutions. They were subject to extra taxes in exchange for exemption from military service, living like Crimean Tatars and speaking dialects of Crimean Tatar. Mikhail Kizilov writes: "According to Marcin Broniewski (1578), the Tatars seldom cultivated the soil themselves, with most of their land tilled by the Polish, Ruthenian, Russian, and Walachian (Moldavian) slaves."

The Jewish population was concentrated in Çufut Kale ('Jewish Fortress'), a separate town near Bahçeseray that was the Khan's original capital. As with other minorities, they spoke a Turkic language. Crimean law granted them special financial and political rights as a reward, according to local folklore, for historic services rendered to an uluhane (first wife of a Khan). The capitation tax on Jews in Crimea was levied by the office of the uluhane in Bahçeseray. Much like the Christian population of Crimea, the Jews were actively involved in the slave trade. Both Christians and Jews also often redeemed Christian and Jewish captives of Tatar raids in Eastern Europe.

== Economy ==
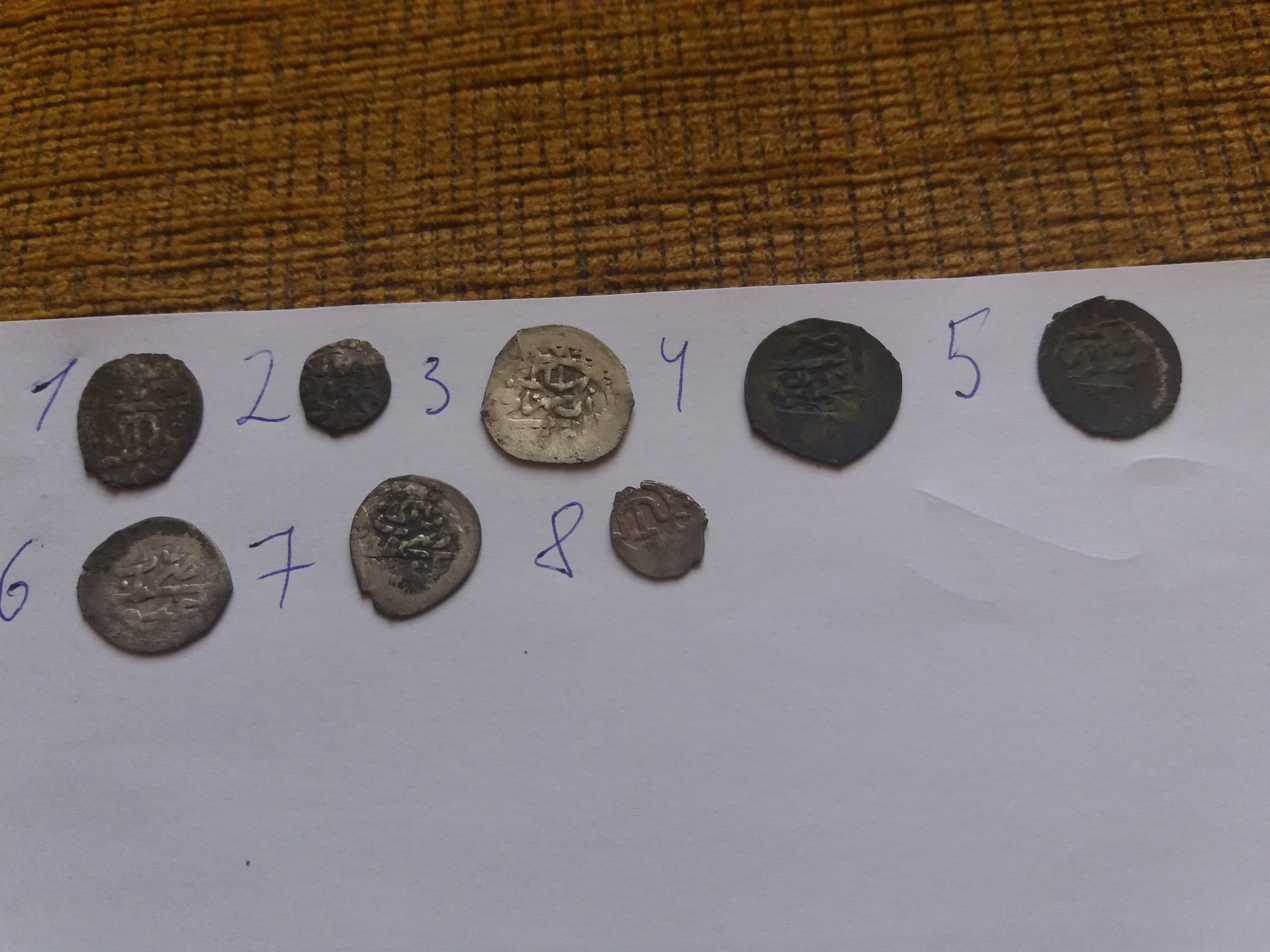
Crimean akçes

The nomadic part of the Crimean Tatars and all the Nogays were cattle breeders. Crimea had important trading ports where the goods arrived via the Silk Road were exported to the Ottoman Empire and Europe. Crimean Khanate had many large cities such as the capital Bahçeseray, Kezlev (Yevpatoria), Qarasu Bazar (Market on black water) and Aqmescit (White-mosque) having numerous hans (caravansarais and merchant quarters), tanners, and mills. Many monuments constructed under the Crimean Khanate were destroyed or left in ruins after the Russian invasion. Mosques, in particular were demolished or remade into Orthodox churches. The settled Crimean Tatars were engaged in trade, agriculture, and artisanry. Crimea was a center of wine, tobacco, and fruit cultivation. Bahçeseray kilims (oriental rugs) were exported to Poland, and knives made by Crimean Tatar artisans were deemed the best by the Caucasian tribes. Crimea was also renowned for manufacture of silk and honey.

The slave trade (15th–17th century) of captured Ukrainians and Russians was one of the major sources of income for Crimean Tatar and Nogai nobility. In this process, known as harvesting the steppe, raiding parties would go out and capture, and then enslave the local Christian peasants living in the countryside. In spite of the dangers, Polish and Russian serfs were attracted to the freedom offered by the empty steppes of Ukraine. The slave raids entered Russian and Cossack folklore and many dumy were written elegising the victims' fates. This contributed to a hatred for the Khanate that transcended political or military concerns. But in fact, there were always small raids committed by both Tatars and Cossacks, in both directions. The last recorded major Crimean raid, before those in the Russo-Turkish War (1768–1774) took place during the reign of Peter I (1682–1725).

== Population ==
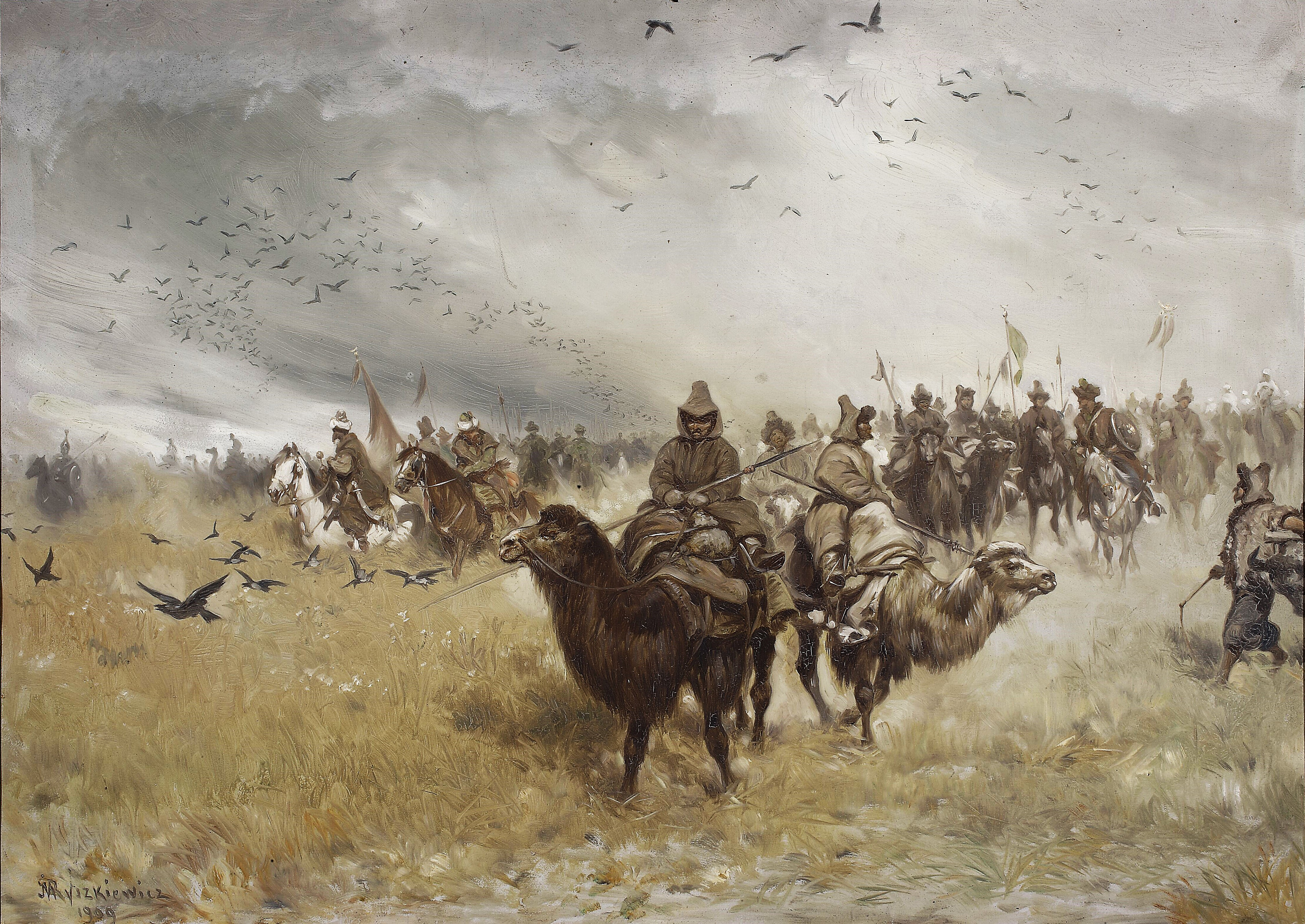
Crimean Tatars in the vanguard of the Ottoman army

The nomadic Crimean Tatars who established the Crimean Khanate were descendants of the population of the Golden Horde. This population also included the Turkic-speaking nomadic nobility of the Kazan and Astrakhan khanates. The Crimean Tatars were also closely related to the Shibanid Uzbeks and the Kazakhs—the Jochid nomadic population of the eastern part of the Kipchak steppe. Both groups spoke the same Kipchak Turkic language and consisted of the same Jochid tribes. The nomads of the Crimean Khanate adopted the name "Tatars", originally an exonym used to refer to the Mongols.

The Crimean Tatars, like the aforementioned nomadic peoples, consisted of Mongol and non-Mongol groups of the Eurasian steppes. The main tribal groupings included tribes of Mongol origin—the Mansur/Manghit, Sijivut, Qungrat, and Barin; of Turkic origin—the Qipchaq; of probable Iranian origin—the Shirin; and of still unclear origin—the Arghin. Among the most powerful tribal nobles (karachi-beks) were the Arghins, Barins, Qipchaqs, and Shirins. Over time, the nomadic Crimean Tatars mixed with the sedentary population of Crimea, which was descended, among others, from the Goths, Greeks, Italians, Armenians, Alans, and Anatolian Turks, contributing in the process of ethnogenesis to the formation of the modern Crimean Tatar people.

The majority of the population consisted of Crimean Tatars, alongside significant communities of Karaims, Italians, Armenians, Greeks, and other peoples. In the early 16th century, part of the Nogais (Manghits) came under the rule of the Crimean khans. They were nomadic and lived outside the Crimean Peninsula, migrating there during periods of drought and shortage of pasture.

According to the renowned Turkish traveler Evliya Çelebi, in 1666 the Crimean Khanate had a population of 1,800,000 Crimean Tatars, 20,000 Karaims, Armenians, and Jews, and 920,000 Ukrainians. A significant part of Ukraine was part of the Crimean Khanate during this period (see Khanate Ukraine).

== Crimean art and architecture ==
=== Selim II Giray fountain ===
The Selim II Giray fountain, built in 1747, is considered one of the masterpieces of Crimean Khanate's hydraulic engineering designs and is still marveled in modern times. It consists of small ceramic pipes, boxed in an underground stone tunnel, stretching back to the spring source more than 20 metres (66 feet) away. It was one of the finest sources of water in Bakhchisaray.

=== Bakhchisaray Fountain ===
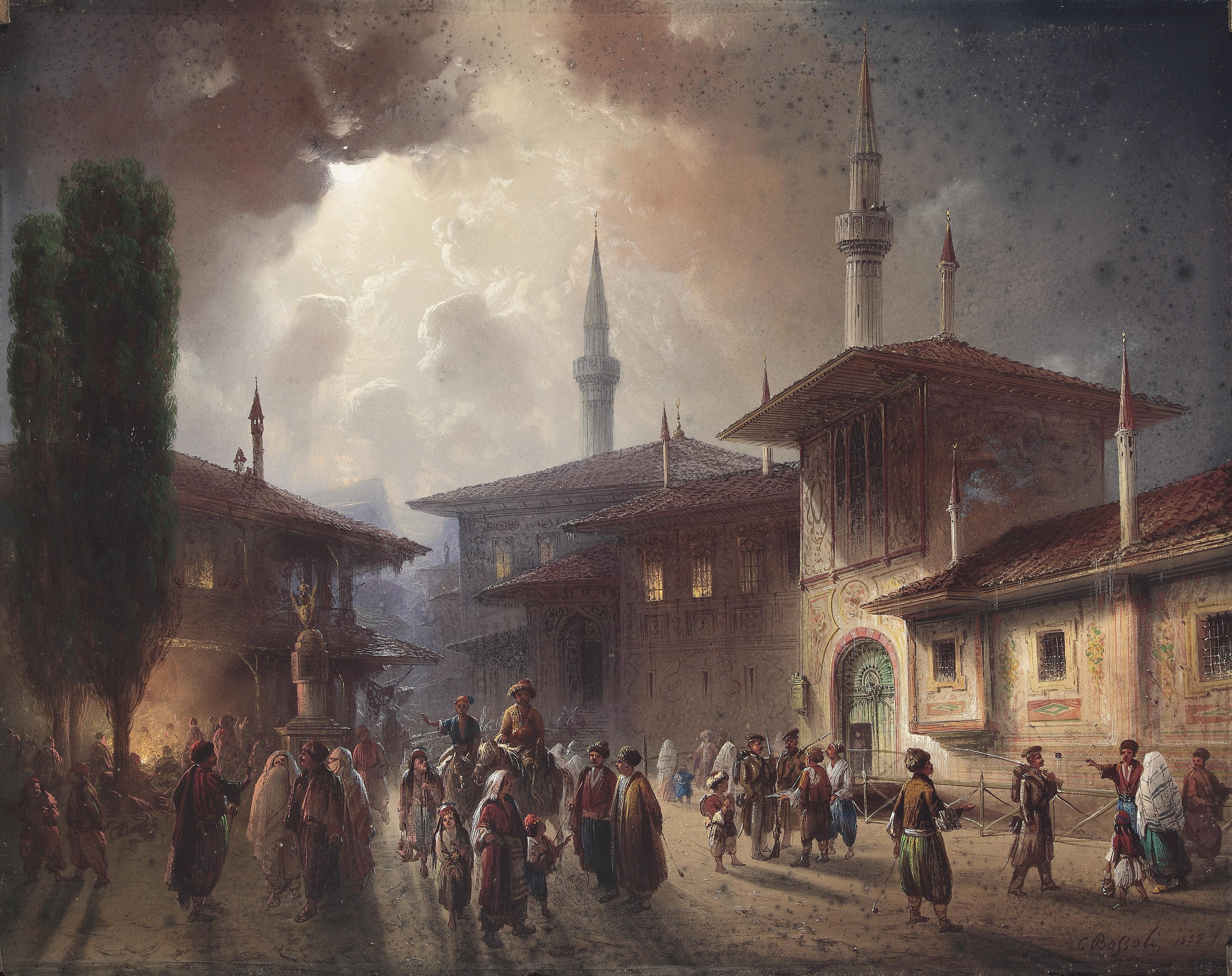
The Crimean Khan's Palace in Bakhchysarai, by Carlo Bossoli

One of the notable constructors of Crimean art and architecture was Qırım Giray, who in 1764 commissioned the fountain master Omer the Persian to construct the Bakhchisaray Fountain. The Bakhchisaray Fountain or Fountain of Tears is a real case of life imitating art. The fountain is known as the embodiment of love of one of the last Crimean Khans, Khan Qırım Giray for his young wife, and his grief after her early death. The Khan was said to have fallen in love with a Polish girl in his harem. Despite his battle-hardened harshness, he was grievous and wept when she died, astonishing all those who knew him. He commissioned a marble fountain to be made, so that the rock would weep, like him, forever.

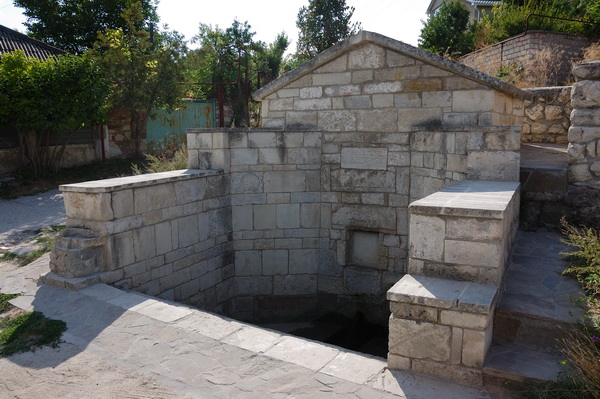
Fountain of Selim II Giray

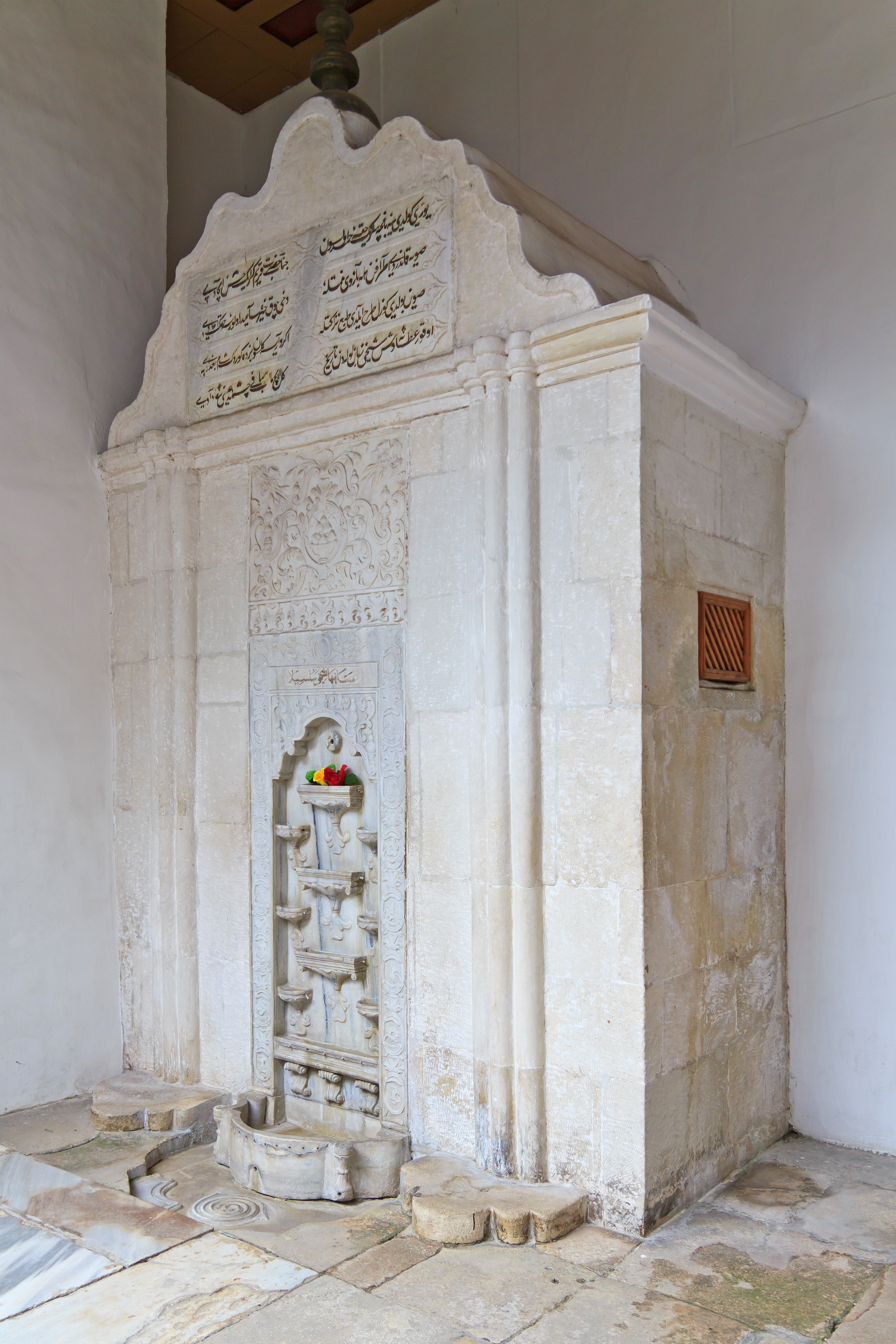
The Bakhchisaray Fountain

== Regions and administration ==
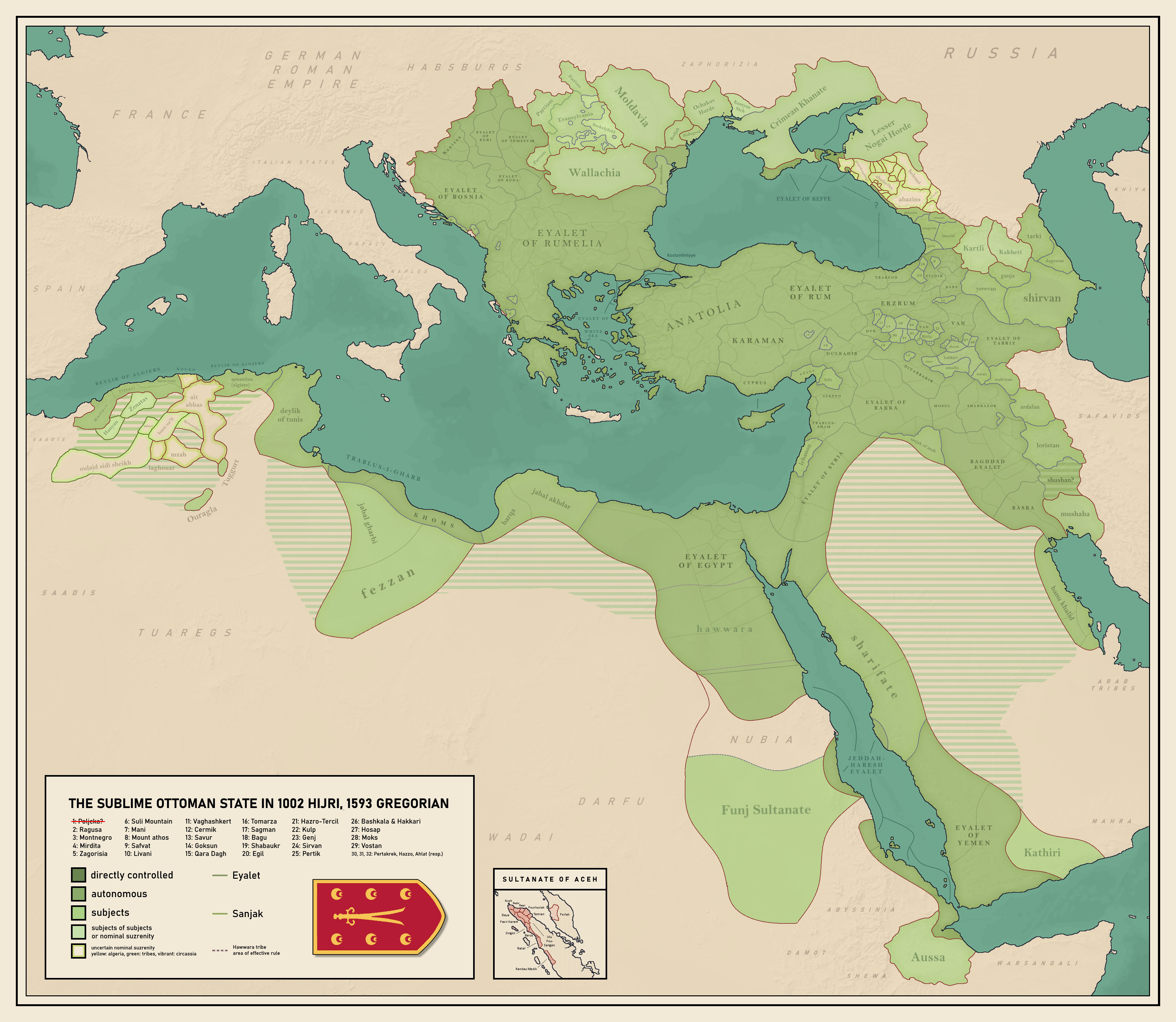
Vassal and tributary states of the Ottoman Empire, including the Lesser Nogai Horde, Ochakov Horde, and Budjak Horde

The nine regions outside of Qirim yurt (the peninsula) were:

- Kaztsiv ulus (located in Kuban)
- Yedychkul Horde
- Cemboylıq Horde
- Yedisan Horde
- Budjak Horde
- Prohnoinsk Palanka (possibly leased to the Zaporizhian Host) (located on the Kinburn peninsula)
- Silistra Province, Ottoman Empire for sometime governed by Bakhchisaray

The peninsula itself was divided by the khan's family and several beys. An estate controlled by a bey was called a beylik. Beys in the khanate were as important as the Polish Magnats. Directly to the khan belonged Cufut-Qale, Bakhchisaray, and Staryi Krym (Eski Qirim). The khan also possessed all the salt lakes and the villages around them, as well as the woods around the rivers Alma, Kacha, and Salgir. Part of his own estate included the wastelands with their newly created settlements.

Part of the main khan's estates were the lands of the Kalga who was next in the line of succession of the khan's family. He usually administered the eastern portion of the peninsula. The Kalga was also Chief Commander of the Crimean Army in the absence of the Khan. The next administrative position, called Nureddin, was also assigned to the khan's family. He administered the western region of the peninsula. There also was a specifically assigned position for the khan's mother or sister — Ana-beim — which was similar to the Ottomans' valide sultan. The senior wife of the Khan carried a rank of Ulu-beim and was next in importance to the Nureddin.

By the end of the khanate regional offices of the kaimakans, who administered smaller regions of the Crimean Khanate, were created.

- Or Qapı (Perekop) had special status. The fortress was controlled either directly by the khan's family or by the family of Shirin.

=== Ottoman Empire territories ===
- Kefe Eyalet, a seat of Ottomans in Crimea until 1774
- Silistra Eyalet, the western coast of Black Sea, later Danube Vilayet
