= Lucky (war dog) =

- Other name: 3610 AD
- Species: Dog
- Breed: German Shepherd
- Sex: Male
- Nationality: United Kingdom
- Employer: Royal Air Force
- Notable role: Dogs in warfare / Detection dog
- Awards: Dickin Medal

Lucky was a dog who received the Dickin Medal in 2007 from the People's Dispensary for Sick Animals for bravery in service during the Malayan Emergency.

== Military service ==
Lucky was a German Shepherd, trained by the Royal Air Force to track terrorists. His RAF identification number was 3610 AD. Lucky was one of four dogs posted to the conflict known as the Malayan Emergency between 1949 and 1952. The other three dogs were called Bobbie, Jasper and Lassie. They were used to track Communist forces in the jungles of Malaysia including assisting in the capture of Lan-Jang-San in February 1951. They were attached to a number of different regiments during this period, including the Gurkha Rifles and the Coldstream Guards. During this period, Lucky's handler was Corporal Beval Austin Stapleton. Lucky was the only one of the four dogs to survive their time in Malaysia.

== Dickin medal ==
Lucky was posthumously awarded the Dickin Medal by the People's Dispensary for Sick Animals on 6 February 2007 at a ceremony at the Imperial War Museum in London alongside another dog, Sadie. It is considered to be the animal's equivalent to the Victoria Cross. The medals were awarded by Princess Alexandra, and Lucky's was received by Corporal Beval Austin Stapleton, who said "Every minute of every day in the jungle we trusted our lives to those four dogs, and they never let us down, Lucky was the only one of the team to survive our time in the Malayan jungle and I'm so proud of the old dog today. I owe my life to him." It was on behalf of the four RAF tracker dogs posted to the Malaysian campaign between 1949 and 1952. (Note: The commendation notes in part: "an exceptional team, capable of tracking and locating the enemy by scent despite unrelenting heat and an almost impregnable jungle." The four dogs were principal participants in capturing "hundreds of communist terrorists including, in February 1951, the notorious gang leader Lan-Jang-San", who had caused deaths of many local persons.)

== See also ==
- List of individual dogs
