= Lucky (name) =

Lucky is an English and Indian language unisex given name and surname.

Notable people with the name include:

== Given name ==
- Lucky Dube (1964–2007), South African reggae musician
- Lucky Enam (born 1952), Bangladeshi actress
- Lucky Igbinedion (born 1957), Nigerian politician
- Lucky Jackson (born 1997), American football player
- Lucky McKee (born 1975), American director
- Lucky Oceans (born 1951), American musician
- Lucky Ogbevoen (born 2000), Austrian-American football player
- Lucky Office (born 1976), Zimbabwean sculptor
- Lucky Blue Smith (born 1998), American model, actor and musician
- Lucky Sutton (born 2004), American football player

== Surname ==
- Gillian Lucky (born 1967), Trinidad and Tobago politician
- Marlon Lucky (born 1986), American football player
- Robert W. Lucky (1936–2022), American engineer
