= Lúčky =

Lúčky may refer to:

- Lúčky, Michalovce District, a village in eastern Slovakia
- Lúčky, Ružomberok District, a village in northern Slovakia
- Lúčky, Žiar nad Hronom District, a village in central Slovakia

== See also ==
- Lucky (disambiguation)
