= Repište =

Repište may refer to:

- Repište, Belgrade, an urban neighborhood
- Repište, Slovakia, municipality in Žiar nad Hronom, Slovakia
- Repište, Vladičin Han, settlement in Vladičin Han, Serbia
