= Horná Ves =

Horná Ves may refer to several places in Slovakia:

- Horná Ves, Prievidza District
- Horná Ves, Žiar nad Hronom District
