= Vyhne =

Vyhne Vihnye
- Municipality
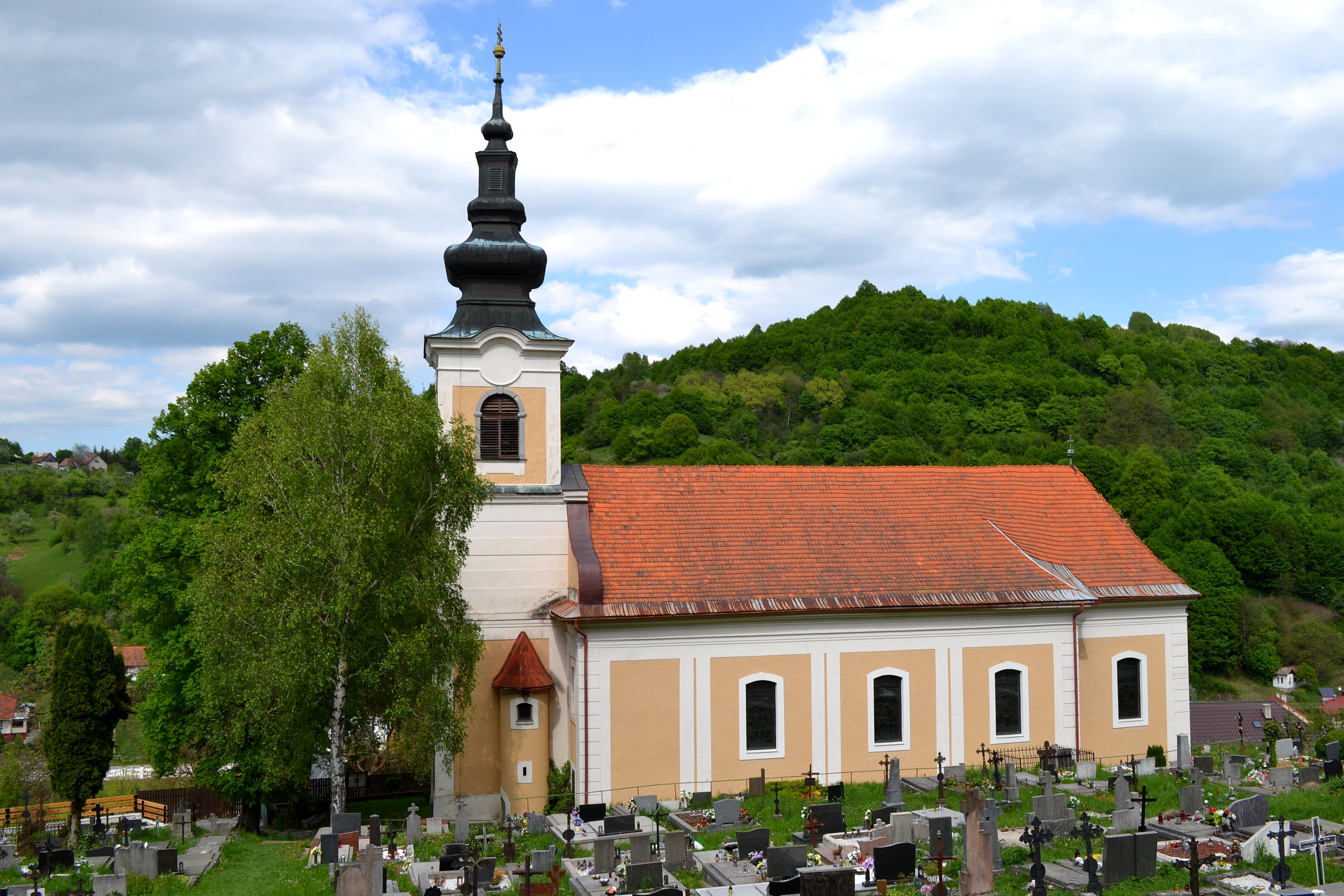

- Flag

- Location of Vyhne in the Banská Bystrica Region Location of Vyhne in Slovakia
- Coordinates: 48.50°N 18.80°E
- Country: Slovakia
- Region: Banská Bystrica Region
- District: Žiar nad Hronom District
- First mentioned: 1326

Government
  - Mayor: Martina Kmeťová (Independent)

Area
  - Total: 32.33 km^{2} (12.48 sq mi)
- Elevation: 344 m (1,129 ft)

Population (2025)
  - Total: 1,112

Population by ethnicity (2021)
  - Slovak: 96.3%
  - Czech: 0.9%
  - Hungarian: 0.4%
  - German: 0.4%
  - Russian: 0.4%
  - Other: 0.5%
  - Unreported: 2.9%

Population by religion (2021)
  - Roman Catholicism: 60.5%
  - Lutheranism: 2%
  - Greek Catholicism: 0.4%
  - Judaism: 0.1%
  - Hinduism: 0.1%
  - Others: 2.4%
  - Non-religious: 30.9%
  - Unreported: 3.7%
- Time zone: UTC+1 (CET)
  - Summer (DST): UTC+2 (CEST)
- Postal code: 966 02
- Area code: +421 45
- Vehicle registration plate (until 2022): ZH
- Website: www.vyhne.sk

Vyhne (Hungarian: Vihnye) is a village in the Žiar nad Hronom District, which is part of the Banská Bystrica Region in central Slovakia.

== Geography ==
Vyhne is located in the Štiavnické vrchy mountains, near the historic town of Banská Štiavnica. A nature reserve called Kamenné more ("Rocky Sea") lies near the village. The municipality lies at an altitude of 344 metres (1,129 ft) and covers an area of 32.33 km^{2} (12.48 sq mi) (2025).

== History ==
The oldest known written record of Vyhne dates from 1326. The municipality officially counts its existence from 1256. The oldest still working brewery in Slovakia was founded there by the Knights Templar in 1473. During WWII, several hundred Jews worked in the Vyhne labor camp.

== Population ==
Population statistic (10 years)
Year	1995	2005	2015	2025
Count	1503	1346	1224	1112
Difference		−10.44%	−9.06%	−9.15%

Population statistic
Year	2024	2025
Count	1117	1112
Difference		−0.44%

It has a population of 1112 people (31 December 2025).

=== Ethnicity ===
Census 2021 (1+%)
Ethnicity	Number	Fraction
Slovak	1107	96.34%
Not found out	33	2.87%
Total	1149	

In year 2021 was 1149 people by ethnicity 1107 as Slovak, 33 as Not found out, 10 as Czech, 5 as Russian, 5 as Hungarian, 4 as German, 3 as Other, 2 as Romani, 1 as Romanian and 1 as Moravian.

Note on population: The difference values of population numbers in the table "Population statistic" and in the sections "Ethnicity" & "Religion" is caused by the use of various statistical methods.

=== Religion ===
Census 2021 (1+%)
Religion	Number	Fraction
Roman Catholic Church	695	60.49%
None	355	30.9%
Not found out	42	3.66%
Evangelical Church	23	2%
Ad hoc movements	19	1.65%
Total	1149	

In year 2021 was 1149 people by religion 695 from Roman Catholic Church, 355 from None, 42 from Not found out, 23 from Evangelical Church, 19 from Ad hoc movements, 4 from Other, 4 from Greek Catholic Church, 2 from Calvinist Church, 2 from Other and not ascertained christian church, 1 from Jewish community, 1 from Jehovah's Witnesses and 1 from Hinduism.

In 2004, the village had a population of 1,341. According to the census in 2001, 98.2% of inhabitants were Slovaks. Roman Catholicism is the most popular religion (79%), but there is also a significant number of atheists (12.7%) living in the village.

== Spa ==
The spa using the hot springs in Vyhne is dated to the 14th century. Developed by the capital from the nearby affluent city of Banská Štiavnica, it has attracted many famous visitors, such as Prince Francis II Rákóczi and writer Mór Jókai. The spa was devastated by World War II. A water park called the Water Paradise (Vodný raj) has operated since June 2007.
