= Horná Ždaňa =

Horná Ždaňa Felsőzsadány
- Municipality
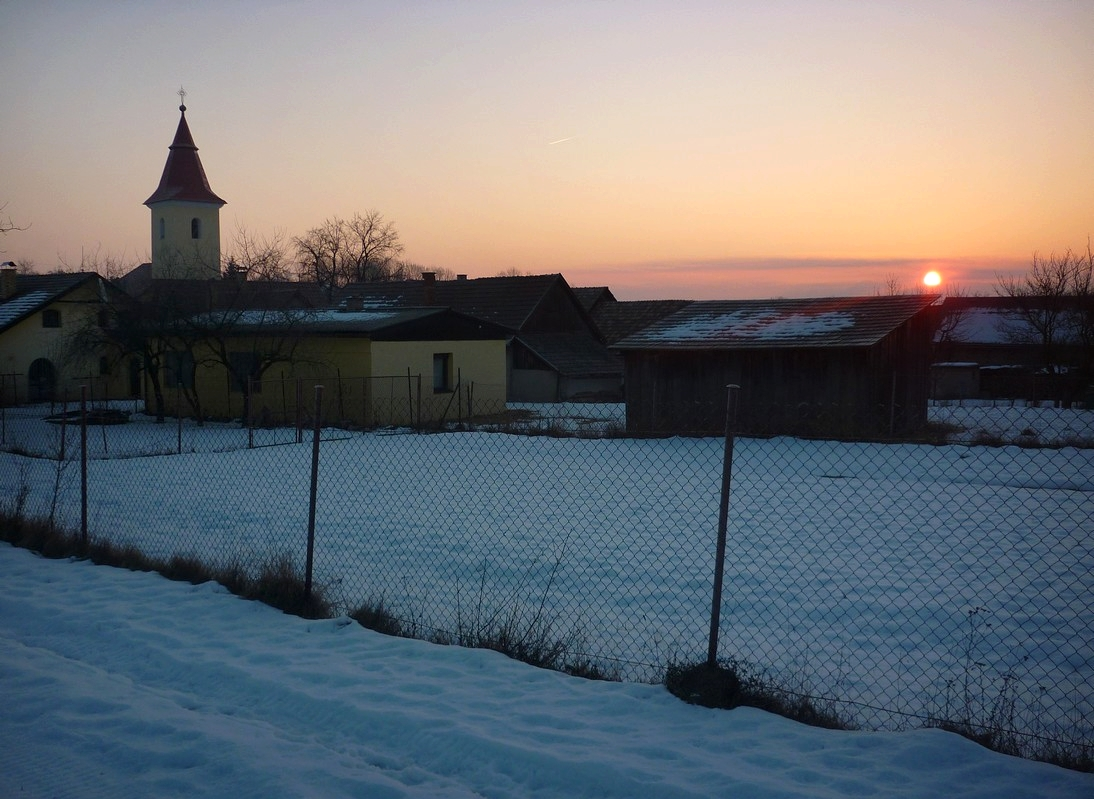

- Flag

- Location of Horná Ždaňa in the Banská Bystrica Region Location of Horná Ždaňa in Slovakia
- Coordinates: 48.57°N 18.75°E
- Country: Slovakia
- Region: Banská Bystrica Region
- District: Žiar nad Hronom District
- First mentioned: 1391

Area
  - Total: 16.26 km^{2} (6.28 sq mi)
- Elevation: 296 m (971 ft)

Population (2025)
  - Total: 524
- Time zone: UTC+1 (CET)
  - Summer (DST): UTC+2 (CEST)
- Postal code: 966 04
- Area code: +421 45
- Vehicle registration plate (until 2022): ZH
- Website: www.hornazdana.sk

Horná Ždaňa (Hungarian: Felsőzsadány) is a village and municipality in Žiar nad Hronom District in the Banská Bystrica Region of central Slovakia.

== Geography ==
The municipality lies at an altitude of 296 metres (971 ft) and covers an area of 16.26 km^{2} (6.28 sq mi) (2025).

== Population ==
Population statistic (10 years)
Year	1995	2005	2015	2025
Count	505	543	555	524
Difference		+7.52%	+2.20%	−5.58%

Population statistic
Year	2024	2025
Count	528	524
Difference		−0.75%

It has a population of 524 people (31 December 2025).

=== Ethnicity ===
Census 2021 (1+ %)
Ethnicity	Number	Fraction
Slovak	530	97.42%
Romani	62	11.39%
Not found out	11	2.02%
Total	544	

In year 2021 was 544 people by ethnicity 530 as Slovak, 62 as Romani, 11 as Not found out, 5 as Czech, 4 as German, 2 as Italian, 1 as Hungarian and 1 as Other.

Note on population: The difference values of population numbers in the table "Population statistic" and in the sections "Ethnicity" & "Religion" is caused by the use of various statistical methods.

=== Religion ===
Census 2021 (1+ %)
Religion	Number	Fraction
Roman Catholic Church	376	69.12%
None	134	24.63%
Not found out	11	2.02%
Greek Catholic Church	6	1.1%
Evangelical Church	6	1.1%
Total	544	

In year 2021 was 544 people by religion 376 from Roman Catholic Church, 134 from None, 11 from Not found out, 6 from Greek Catholic Church, 6 from Evangelical Church, 3 from United Methodist Church, 2 from Christian Congregations in Slovakia, 2 from Buddhism, 1 from Calvinist Church, 1 from Jehovah's Witnesses, 1 from Other and 1 from Seventh-day Adventist Church.

== Genealogical resources ==
The records for genealogical research are available at the state archive "Statny Archiv in Banska Bystrica, Slovakia"

- Roman Catholic church records (births/marriages/deaths): 1686-1895 (parish A)
- Lutheran church records (births/marriages/deaths): 1812-1895 (parish B)

== See also ==
- List of municipalities and towns in Slovakia
