= Prochot =

Prochot Kelő
- Municipality
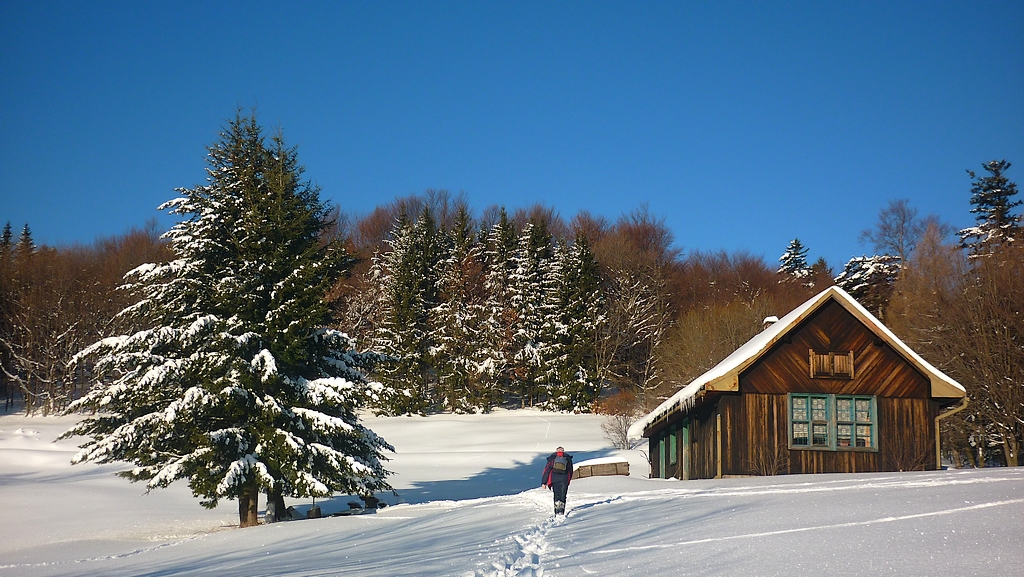
- A panorama of Prochot.

- Flag

- Location of Prochot in the Banská Bystrica Region Location of Prochot in Slovakia
- Coordinates: 48.60°N 18.72°E
- Country: Slovakia
- Region: Banská Bystrica Region
- District: Žiar nad Hronom District
- First mentioned: 1414

Government
  - Mayor: Martina Rozenbergová (Ind.)

Area
  - Total: 18.50 km^{2} (7.14 sq mi)
- Elevation: 494 m (1,621 ft)

Population (2025)
  - Total: 553
- Time zone: UTC+1 (CET)
  - Summer (DST): UTC+2 (CEST)
- Postal code: 966 04
- Area code: +421 45
- Vehicle registration plate (until 2022): ZH
- Website: www.prochot.eu

Prochot (Hungarian: Kelő) is a village and municipality in Žiar nad Hronom District in the Banská Bystrica Region of central Slovakia.

== Geography ==
The municipality lies at an altitude of 494 metres (1,621 ft) and covers an area of 18.50 km^{2} (7.14 sq mi) (2025).

== Population ==
Population statistic (10 years)
Year	1995	2005	2015	2025
Count	693	617	567	553
Difference		−10.96%	−8.10%	−2.46%

Population statistic
Year	2024	2025
Count	553	553
Difference		+0%

It has a population of 553 people (31 December 2025).

=== Ethnicity ===
Census 2021 (1+ %)
Ethnicity	Number	Fraction
Slovak	560	98.76%
Total	567	

In year 2021 was 567 people by ethnicity 560 as Slovak, 5 as Czech, 5 as Not found out, 2 as Hungarian, 1 as Chinese, 1 as Russian, 1 as Canadian and 1 as English.

Note on population: The difference values of population numbers in the table "Population statistic" and in the sections "Ethnicity" & "Religion" is caused by the use of various statistical methods.

=== Religion ===
Census 2021 (1+ %)
Religion	Number	Fraction
Roman Catholic Church	475	83.77%
None	78	13.76%
Total	567	

In year 2021 was 567 people by religion 475 from Roman Catholic Church, 78 from None, 3 from Other, 2 from Not found out, 2 from Evangelical Church, 2 from Ad hoc movements, 1 from Other and not ascertained christian church, 1 from Christian Congregations in Slovakia, 1 from Czechoslovak Hussite Church, 1 from Seventh-day Adventist Church and 1 from Buddhism.
