= Kosorín =

Village and municipality in Slovakia

Kosorín Koszorús
- Municipality
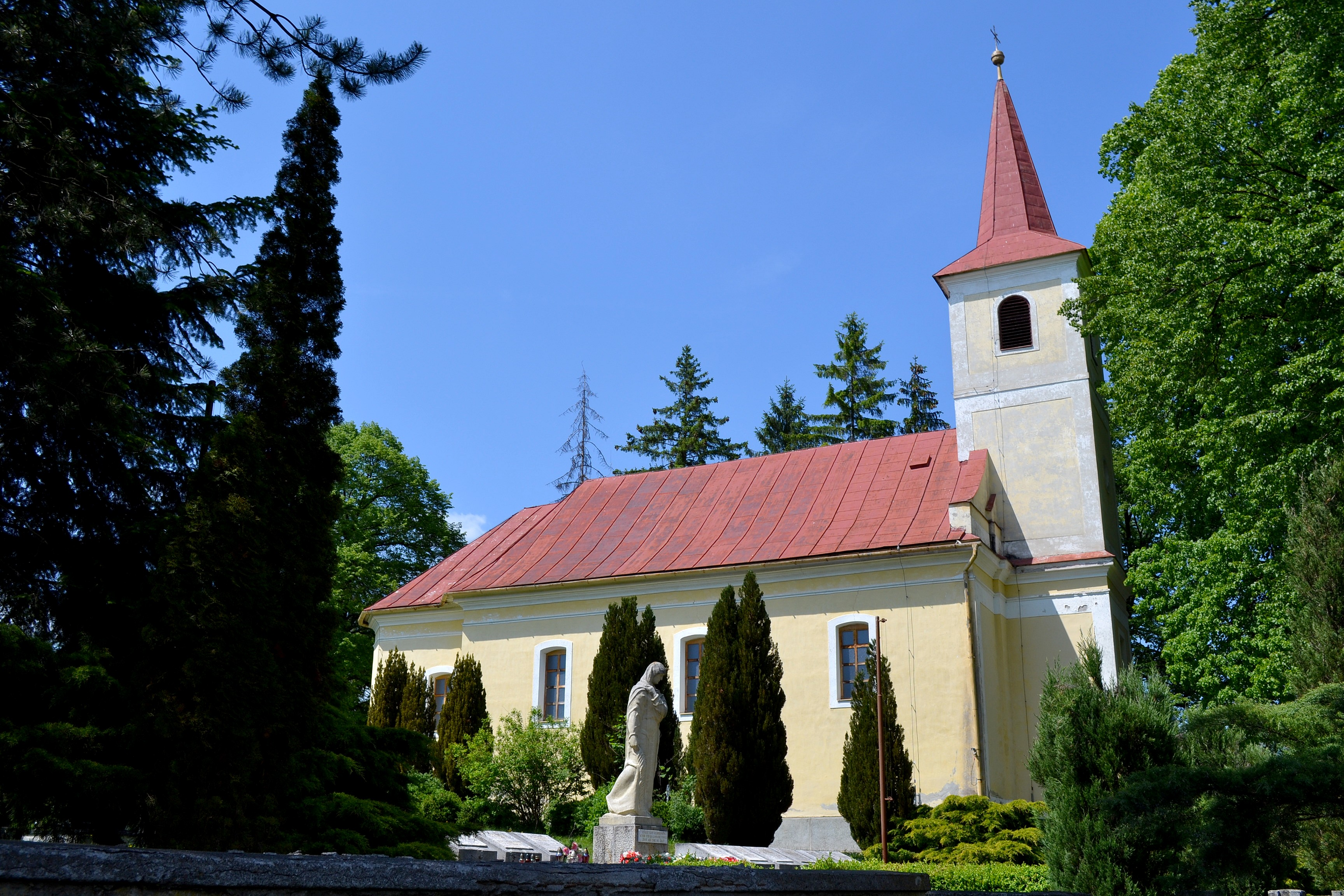
- A castle in Kosorín.

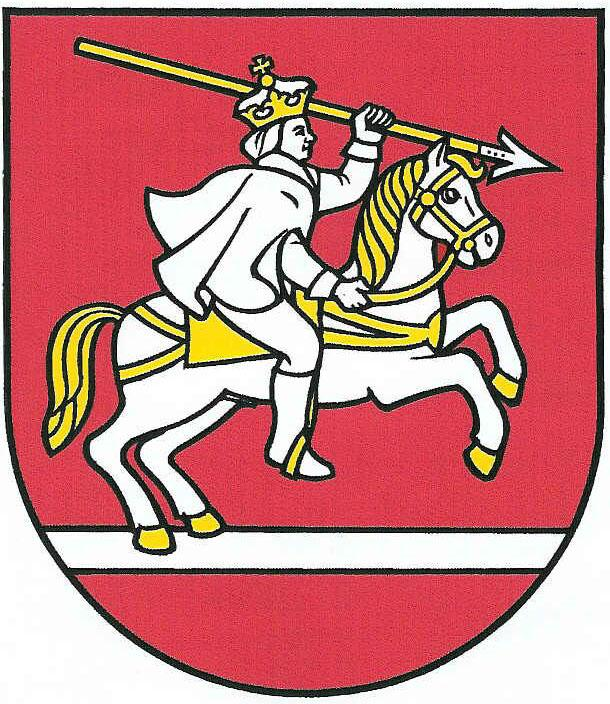
- Flag Coat of arms

- Location of Kosorín in the Banská Bystrica Region Location of Kosorín in Slovakia
- Coordinates: 48.65°N 18.82°E
- Country: Slovakia
- Region: Banská Bystrica Region
- District: Žiar nad Hronom District
- First mentioned: 1487

Government
  - Mayor: Darina Morvayová (Ind.)

Area
  - Total: 12.74 km^{2} (4.92 sq mi)
- Elevation: 366 m (1,201 ft)

Population (2025)
  - Total: 439
- Time zone: UTC+1 (CET)
  - Summer (DST): UTC+2 (CEST)
- Postal code: 966 24
- Area code: +421 45
- Vehicle registration plate (until 2022): ZH
- Website: www.kosorin.sk

Kosorín (Hungarian: Koszorús) is a village and municipality in Žiar nad Hronom District in the Banská Bystrica Region of central Slovakia.

== Geography ==
The municipality lies at an altitude of 366 metres (1,201 ft) and covers an area of 12.74 km^{2} (4.92 sq mi) (2025).

== Population ==
Population statistic (10 years)
Year	1995	2005	2015	2025
Count	405	412	429	439
Difference		+1.72%	+4.12%	+2.33%

Population statistic
Year	2024	2025
Count	439	439
Difference		+1.42%

It has a population of 439 people (31 December 2025).

=== Ethnicity ===
Census 2021 (1+ %)
Ethnicity	Number	Fraction
Slovak	455	95.58%
Not found out	21	4.41%
Czech	6	1.26%
Total	476	

In year 2021 was 476 people by ethnicity 455 as Slovak, 21 as Not found out, 6 as Czech, 3 as Other, 2 as Hungarian and 1 as Moravian.

Note on population: The difference values of population numbers in the table "Population statistic" and in the sections "Ethnicity" & "Religion" is caused by the use of various statistical methods.

=== Religion ===
Census 2021 (1+ %)
Religion	Number	Fraction
Roman Catholic Church	306	64.29%
None	124	26.05%
Not found out	19	3.99%
Evangelical Church	15	3.15%
Other	5	1.05%
Total	476	

In year 2021 was 476 people by religion 306 from Roman Catholic Church, 124 from None, 19 from Not found out, 15 from Evangelical Church, 5 from Other, 4 from Greek Catholic Church, 2 from Christian Congregations in Slovakia and 1 from Ad hoc movements.

== Genealogical resources ==
The records for genealogical research are available at the state archive "Statny Archiv in Banska Bystrica, Slovakia"

- Roman Catholic church records (births/marriages/deaths): 1765-1897 (parish B)

== See also ==
- List of municipalities and towns in Slovakia
