= Pitelová =

Pitelová Kiszelfalu
- Municipality
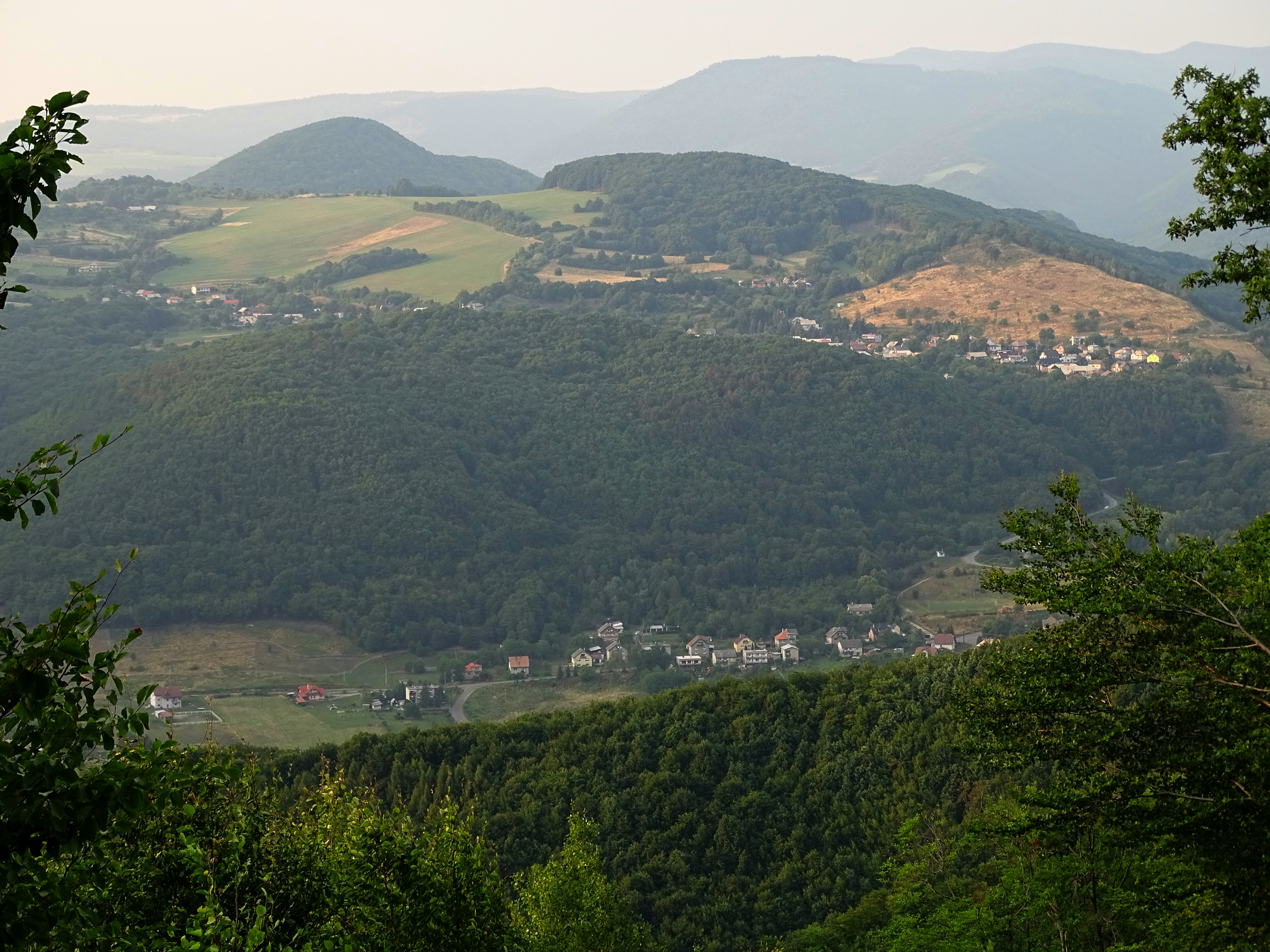

- Flag

- Location of Pitelová in the Banská Bystrica Region Location of Pitelová in Slovakia
- Coordinates: 48.60°N 18.93°E
- Country: Slovakia
- Region: Banská Bystrica Region
- District: Žiar nad Hronom District
- First mentioned: 1264

Government
  - Mayor: Martina Záhorcová (Ind.)

Area
  - Total: 10.81 km^{2} (4.17 sq mi)
- Elevation: 457 m (1,499 ft)

Population (2025)
  - Total: 605
- Time zone: UTC+1 (CET)
  - Summer (DST): UTC+2 (CEST)
- Postal code: 966 11
- Area code: +421 45
- Vehicle registration plate (until 2022): ZH
- Website: www.pitelova.eu

Pitelová (Hungarian: Kiszelfalu) is a village and municipality in Žiar nad Hronom District in the Banská Bystrica Region of central Slovakia.

== Geography ==
The municipality lies at an altitude of 457 metres (1,499 ft) and covers an area of 10.81 km^{2} (4.17 sq mi) (2025).

== Population ==
Population statistic (10 years)
Year	1995	2005	2015	2025
Count	647	660	634	605
Difference		+2.00%	−3.93%	−4.57%

Population statistic
Year	2024	2025
Count	600	605
Difference		+0.83%

It has a population of 605 people (31 December 2025).

=== Ethnicity ===
Census 2021 (1+ %)
Ethnicity	Number	Fraction
Slovak	608	96.35%
Not found out	22	3.48%
Total	631	

In year 2021 was 631 people by ethnicity 608 as Slovak, 22 as Not found out, 4 as Czech, 1 as Russian, 1 as Hungarian and 1 as Other.

Note on population: The difference values of population numbers in the table "Population statistic" and in the sections "Ethnicity" & "Religion" is caused by the use of various statistical methods.

=== Religion ===
Census 2021 (1+ %)
Religion	Number	Fraction
Roman Catholic Church	466	73.85%
None	109	17.27%
Not found out	23	3.65%
Evangelical Church	10	1.58%
Greek Catholic Church	9	1.43%
Total	631	

In year 2021 was 631 people by religion 466 from Roman Catholic Church, 109 from None, 23 from Not found out, 10 from Evangelical Church, 9 from Greek Catholic Church, 5 from Christian Congregations in Slovakia, 3 from Other and not ascertained christian church, 3 from Ad hoc movements, 2 from Calvinist Church and 1 from Other.
