= Lehôtka pod Brehmi =

Lehôtka pod Brehmi Apáthegyalja
- Municipality
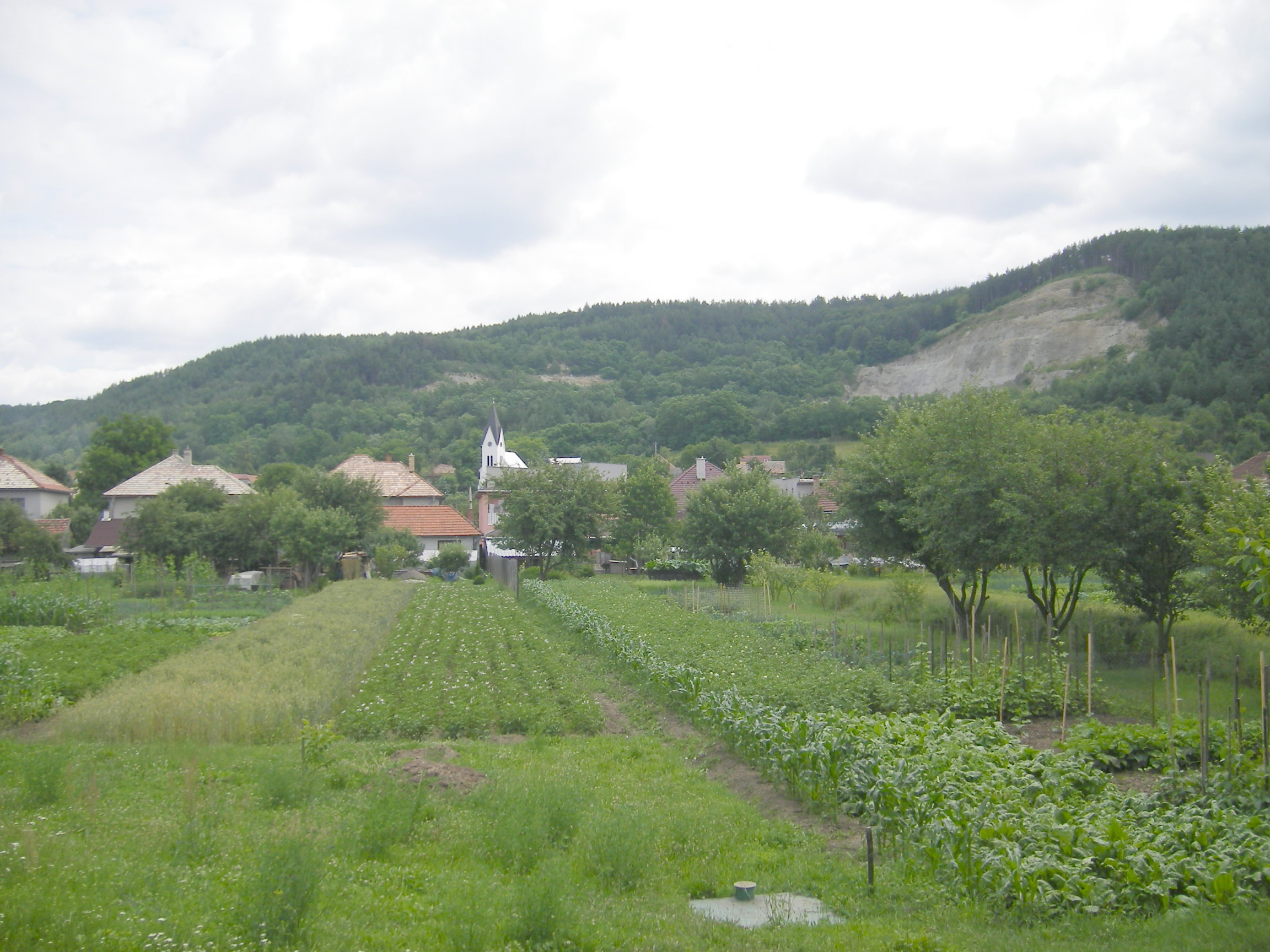

- Flag

- Location of Lehôtka pod Brehmi in the Banská Bystrica Region Location of Lehôtka pod Brehmi in Slovakia
- Coordinates: 48.54°N 18.81°E
- Country: Slovakia
- Region: Banská Bystrica Region
- District: Žiar nad Hronom District
- First mentioned: 1391

Area
  - Total: 4.66 km^{2} (1.80 sq mi)
- Elevation: 251 m (823 ft)

Population (2025)
  - Total: 404
- Time zone: UTC+1 (CET)
  - Summer (DST): UTC+2 (CEST)
- Postal code: 966 01
- Area code: +421 45
- Vehicle registration plate (until 2022): ZH
- Website: www.lehotkapodbrehmi.sk

Lehôtka pod Brehmi (Hungarian: Apáthegyalja) is a village and municipality in Žiar nad Hronom District in the Banská Bystrica Region of central Slovakia.

== Geography ==
The municipality lies at an altitude of 251 metres (823 ft) and covers an area of 4.66 km^{2} (1.80 sq mi) (2025).

== Population ==
Population statistic (10 years)
Year	1995	2005	2015	2025
Count	326	375	414	404
Difference		+15.03%	+10.4%	−2.41%

Population statistic
Year	2024	2025
Count	397	404
Difference		+1.76%

It has a population of 404 people (31 December 2025).

=== Ethnicity ===
Census 2021 (1+ %)
Ethnicity	Number	Fraction
Slovak	359	90.65%
Not found out	34	8.58%
Romani	12	3.03%
Total	396	

In year 2021 was 396 people by ethnicity 359 as Slovak, 34 as Not found out, 12 as Romani, 1 as Czech, 1 as Polish and 1 as Hungarian.

Note on population: The difference values of population numbers in the table "Population statistic" and in the sections "Ethnicity" & "Religion" is caused by the use of various statistical methods.

=== Religion ===
Census 2021 (1+ %)
Religion	Number	Fraction
Roman Catholic Church	249	62.88%
None	93	23.48%
Not found out	31	7.83%
Greek Catholic Church	9	2.27%
Evangelical Church	6	1.52%
Christian Congregations in Slovakia	4	1.01%
Total	396	

In year 2021 was 396 people by religion 249 from Roman Catholic Church, 93 from None, 31 from Not found out, 9 from Greek Catholic Church, 6 from Evangelical Church, 4 from Christian Congregations in Slovakia, 2 from Other, 1 from Paganism and natural spirituality and 1 from Hinduism.
