= Žiar nad Hronom District =

Coordinates: 48°35′18″N 18°50′58″E

- District
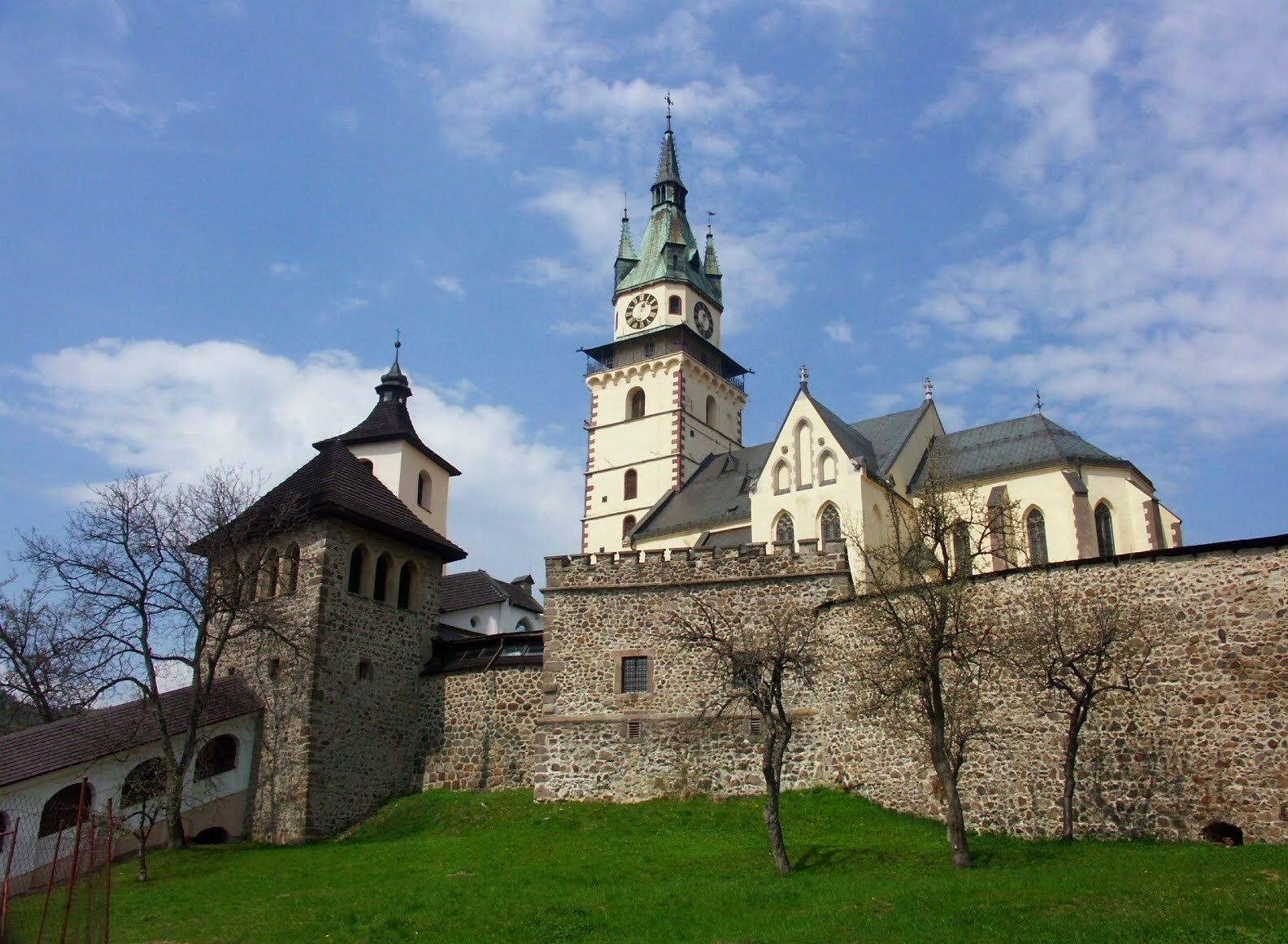
- Country: Slovakia
- Region (kraj): Banská Bystrica Region
- Seat: Žiar nad Hronom

Area
  - Total: 517.65 km^{2} (199.87 sq mi)

Population (2025)
  - Total: 42,955
- Time zone: UTC+1 (CET)
  - Summer (DST): UTC+2 (CEST)
- Telephone prefix: 045
- Vehicle registration plate (until 2022): ZH
- Municipalities: 35

Žiar nad Hronom District (Slovak: okres Žiar nad Hronom) is a district in the Banská Bystrica Region of central Slovakia. Until 1918, the district was part of the county of Tekov.

== Population ==
Historical population
| Year | Pop. | ±% |
|---|---|---|
| 1970 | 43,301 | — |
| 1980 | 46,911 | +8.3% |
| 1991 | 47,638 | +1.5% |
| 2001 | 48,125 | +1.0% |
| 2011 | 48,289 | +0.3% |
| 2021 | 44,844 | −7.1% |
Source: Censuses

Population statistic (10 years)
| Year | 1995 | 2005 | 2015 | 2025 |
|---|---|---|---|---|
| Count | 48,509 | 47,836 | 47,441 | 42,955 |
| Difference | | −1.38% | −0.82% | −9.45% |

Population statistic
| Year | 2024 | 2025 |
|---|---|---|
| Count | 43,345 | 42,955 |
| Difference | | −0.89% |

It has a population of 42,955 people (31 December 2025).

=== Ethnicity ===
Census 2021 (1+ %)
| Ethnicity | Number | Fraction |
|---|---|---|
| Slovak | 41,621 | 90.28% |
| Not found out | 2890 | 6.26% |
| Romani | 571 | 1.23% |
| Total | 46,100 | |

In year 2021 was 46,100 people by ethnicity 41,621 as Slovak, 2890 as Not found out, 571 as Romani, 301 as Czech, 167 as German, 152 as Hungarian, 103 as Other, 62 as Russian, 55 as Rusyn, 35 as Ukrainian, 25 as Polish, 17 as Vietnamese, 14 as English, 13 as Italian, 13 as Serbian, 11 as Moravian, 8 as Jewish, 8 as French, 5 as Austrian, 5 as Croatian, 5 as Albanian, 4 as Chinese, 4 as Romanian, 3 as Irish, 3 as Turkish, 2 as Canadian, 2 as Greek and 1 as Bulgarian.

Note on population: The difference values of population numbers in the table "Population statistic" and in the sections "Ethnicity" & "Religion" is caused by the use of various statistical methods.

=== Religion ===
Census 2021 (1+ %)
| Religion | Number | Fraction |
|---|---|---|
| Roman Catholic Church | 25,598 | 57.08% |
| None | 13,436 | 29.96% |
| Not found out | 3478 | 7.76% |
| Evangelical Church | 1021 | 2.28% |
| Total | 44,844 | |

In year 2021 was 44,844 people by religion 25,598 from Roman Catholic Church, 13,436 from None, 3478 from Not found out, 1021 from Evangelical Church, 283 from Greek Catholic Church, 250 from Christian Congregations in Slovakia, 185 from Ad hoc movements, 128 from Other, 78 from Other and not ascertained christian church, 62 from Buddhism, 57 from Calvinist Church, 51 from Paganism and natural spirituality, 40 from Eastern Orthodox Church, 32 from Jehovah's Witnesses, 24 from Seventh-day Adventist Church, 20 from Church of the Brethren, 19 from United Methodist Church, 18 from Islam, 16 from Hinduism, 14 from Old Catholic Church, 9 from Apostolic Church, 8 from Jewish community, 7 from Baptists Church, 6 from Czechoslovak Hussite Church and 4 from Bahá'i Community.

== Municipalities ==
The names in bold represent towns.

| Municipality | Area [km^{2}] | Population |
|---|---|---|
| Bartošova Lehôtka | 8.63 | 339 |
| Bzenica | 19.04 | 642 |
| Dolná Trnávka | 2.84 | 347 |
| Dolná Ves | 2.36 | 236 |
| Dolná Ždaňa | 8.16 | 884 |
| Hliník nad Hronom | 11.33 | 2,595 |
| Horná Ves | 0.00 | 634 |
| Horná Ždaňa | 16.26 | 524 |
| Hronská Dúbrava | 5.04 | 428 |
| Ihráč | 20.75 | 462 |
| Janova Lehota | 17.67 | 925 |
| Jastrabá | 10.82 | 547 |
| Kopernica | 17.56 | 384 |
| Kosorín | 12.74 | 439 |
| Krahule | 10.77 | 252 |
| **Kremnica** | 46.79 | 4,586 |
| Kremnické Bane | 7.74 | 253 |
| Kunešov | 23.63 | 190 |
| Ladomerská Vieska | 10.41 | 757 |
| Lehôtka pod Brehmi | 4.66 | 404 |
| Lovča | 10.44 | 682 |
| Lovčica-Trubín | 34.57 | 1,559 |
| Lúčky | 8.23 | 189 |
| Lutila | 26.00 | 1,381 |
| Nevoľné | 3.10 | 387 |
| Pitelová | 10.81 | 605 |
| Prestavlky | 15.00 | 676 |
| Prochot | 18.50 | 553 |
| Repište | 10.38 | 271 |
| Sklené Teplice | 10.91 | 373 |
| Slaská | 16.00 | 560 |
| Stará Kremnička | 13.49 | 1,099 |
| Trnavá Hora | 24.55 | 1,247 |
| Vyhne | 32.33 | 1,112 |
| **Žiar nad Hronom** | 39.98 | 16,433 |

Population and area values are current for year 2025.
