= Jastrabá =

Village and municipality of Slovakia

Jastrabá Karvaly
- Municipality
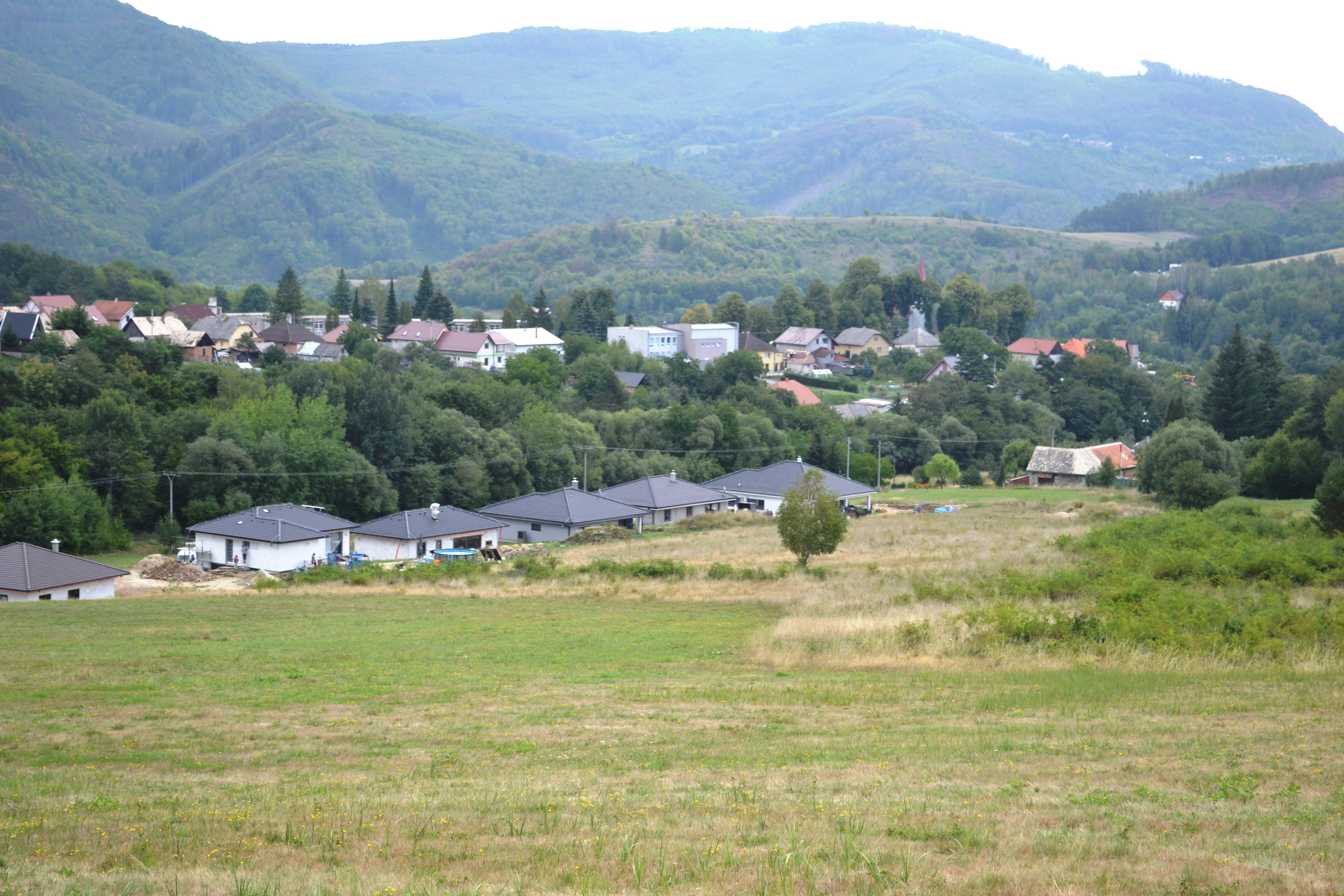
- Overlook of Jastrabá.

- Flag

- Location of Jastrabá in the Banská Bystrica Region Location of Jastrabá in Slovakia
- Coordinates: 48.63°N 18.93°E
- Country: Slovakia
- Region: Banská Bystrica Region
- District: Žiar nad Hronom District
- First mentioned: 1487

Government
  - Mayor: Zdenko Matúška (Ind.)

Area
  - Total: 10.82 km^{2} (4.18 sq mi)
- Elevation: 425 m (1,394 ft)

Population (2025)
  - Total: 547
- Time zone: UTC+1 (CET)
  - Summer (DST): UTC+2 (CEST)
- Postal code: 966 32
- Area code: +421 45
- Vehicle registration plate (until 2022): ZH
- Website: www.jastraba.eu

Jastrabá (Hungarian: Karvaly) is a village and municipality in Žiar nad Hronom District in the Banská Bystrica Region of central Slovakia. The first notice in 1487.

== Geography ==
The municipality lies at an altitude of 425 metres (1,394 ft) and covers an area of 10.82 km^{2} (4.18 sq mi) (2025).

== Population ==
Population statistic (10 years)
Year	1995	2005	2015	2025
Count	598	572	545	547
Difference		−4.34%	−4.72%	+0.36%

Population statistic
Year	2024	2025
Count	552	547
Difference		−0.90%

It has a population of 547 people (31 December 2025).

=== Ethnicity ===
Census 2021 (1+ %)
Ethnicity	Number	Fraction
Slovak	537	95.55%
Not found out	25	4.44%
Czech	6	1.06%
Total	562	

In year 2021 was 562 people by ethnicity 537 as Slovak, 25 as Not found out, 6 as Czech, 2 as Rusyn, 1 as Jewish, 1 as Russian, 1 as Austrian and 1 as Hungarian.

Note on population: The difference values of population numbers in the table "Population statistic" and in the sections "Ethnicity" & "Religion" is caused by the use of various statistical methods.

=== Religion ===
Census 2021 (1+ %)
Religion	Number	Fraction
Roman Catholic Church	428	76.16%
None	83	14.77%
Not found out	26	4.63%
Greek Catholic Church	7	1.25%
Evangelical Church	7	1.25%
Total	562	

In year 2021 was 562 people by religion 428 from Roman Catholic Church, 83 from None, 26 from Not found out, 7 from Greek Catholic Church, 7 from Evangelical Church, 5 from Ad hoc movements, 3 from Christian Congregations in Slovakia, 2 from Other and 1 from Jewish community.

== Genealogical resources ==
The records for genealogical research are available at the state archive "Statny Archiv in Banska Bystrica, Slovakia"

- Roman Catholic church records (births/marriages/deaths): 1710-1896 (parish A)
- Lutheran church records (births/marriages/deaths): 1666-1891 (parish B)

== See also ==
- List of municipalities and towns in Slovakia
