= Bartošova Lehôtka =

Village and municipality in Slovakia

Bartošova Lehôtka Bartos
- Municipality
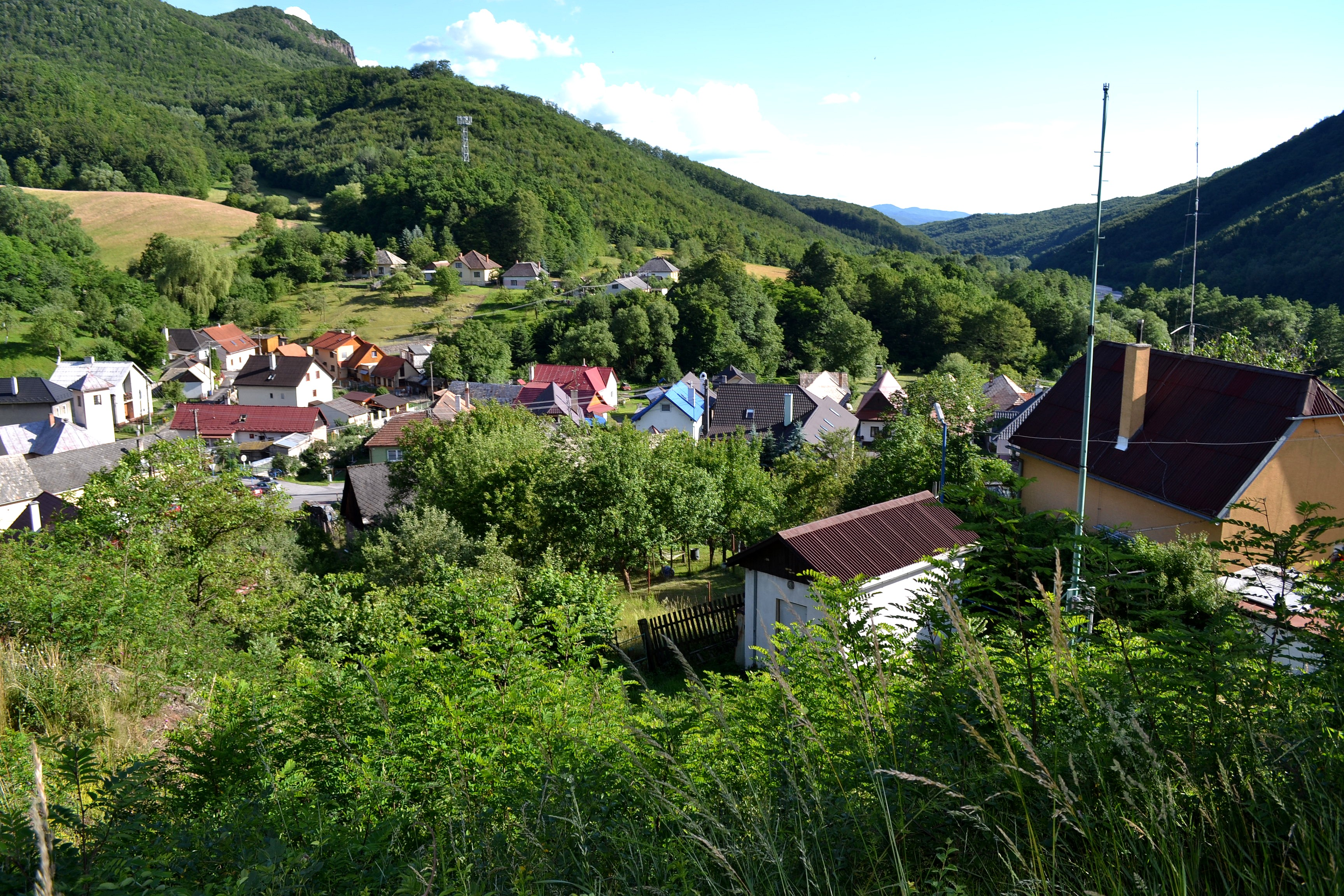

- Flag

- Location of Bartošova Lehôtka in the Banská Bystrica Region Location of Bartošova Lehôtka in Slovakia
- Coordinates: 48.65°N 18.91°E
- Country: Slovakia
- Region: Banská Bystrica Region
- District: Žiar nad Hronom District
- First mentioned: 1487

Area
  - Total: 8.63 km^{2} (3.33 sq mi)
- Elevation: 390 m (1,280 ft)

Population (2025)
  - Total: 339
- Time zone: UTC+1 (CET)
  - Summer (DST): UTC+2 (CEST)
- Postal code: 966 31
- Area code: +421 45
- Vehicle registration plate (until 2022): ZH
- Website: www.bartosovalehotka.sk

Bartošova Lehôtka (1920–1927: Bartošová Lehôtka, 1927–1946: Bartošova Lehotka; German: Lehotka; Hungarian: Bartos, until 1888: Bartoslehot(k)a) is a village and municipality in the Žiar nad Hronom District in the Banská Bystrica Region of central Slovakia.

== Geography ==
The municipality lies at an altitude of 390 metres (1,280 ft) and covers an area of 8.63 km^{2} (3.33 sq mi) (2025).

== History ==
In historical records, the village was first mentioned in 1396. Its name in 1487 was Bartoslevka (1534 Barthoslehotha; lehota means village in Slovak). It belonged to the Esztergom Archbishopric and since 1776 to the Banská Bystrica Bishopric.

== Municipality ==
The municipality is headed by Zlatica Groschová, who ran as an independent candidate in 2018 elections, beating Ľubomír Bielik of SNS by a swing of over 5%. Local council is assembled of 5 councillors, all of whom ran as independent candidates.

As of 2021, Bartošova Lehôtka separates 54.5% of its municipal waste.

== Population ==
Population statistic (10 years)
Year	1995	2005	2015	2025
Count	407	417	371	339
Difference		+2.45%	−11.03%	−8.62%

Population statistic
Year	2024	2025
Count	345	339
Difference		−1.73%

It has a population of 339 people (31 December 2025).

=== Ethnicity ===
Census 2021 (1+ %)
Ethnicity	Number	Fraction
Slovak	338	95.48%
Not found out	14	3.95%
Total	354	

In year 2021 was 354 people by ethnicity 338 as Slovak, 14 as Not found out, 2 as Czech, 1 as German, 1 as Hungarian and 1 as Other.

Note on population: The difference values of population numbers in the table "Population statistic" and in the sections "Ethnicity" & "Religion" is caused by the use of various statistical methods.

=== Religion ===
Census 2021 (1+ %)
Religion	Number	Fraction
Roman Catholic Church	246	69.49%
None	73	20.62%
Not found out	12	3.39%
Evangelical Church	8	2.26%
Christian Congregations in Slovakia	7	1.98%
Total	354	

In year 2021 was 354 people by religion 246 from Roman Catholic Church, 73 from None, 12 from Not found out, 8 from Evangelical Church, 7 from Christian Congregations in Slovakia, 2 from Calvinist Church, 2 from Greek Catholic Church, 2 from Ad hoc movements, 1 from Paganism and natural spirituality and 1 from Buddhism.

== Genealogical resources ==
The records for genealogical research are available at the state archive in Banská Bystrica (Slovak: Štátny archív v Banskej Bystrici).

- Roman Catholic church records (births/marriages/deaths): 1710-1896 (parish B)

== See also ==
- List of municipalities and towns in Slovakia
