= Ihráč =

Village and municipality in Slovakia

Ihráč Dallos
- Municipality
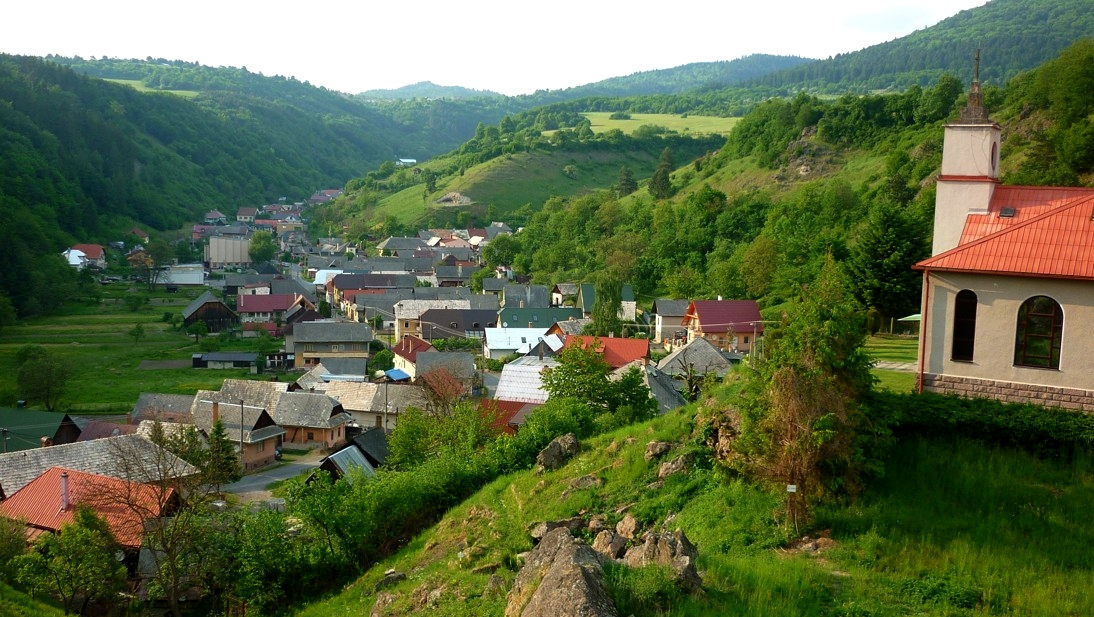

- Flag

- Location of Ihráč in the Banská Bystrica Region Location of Ihráč in Slovakia
- Coordinates: 48.65°N 18.95°E
- Country: Slovakia
- Region: Banská Bystrica Region
- District: Žiar nad Hronom District
- First mentioned: 1388

Area
  - Total: 20.75 km^{2} (8.01 sq mi)
- Elevation: 485 m (1,591 ft)

Population (2025)
  - Total: 462
- Time zone: UTC+1 (CET)
  - Summer (DST): UTC+2 (CEST)
- Postal code: 967 01
- Area code: +421 45
- Vehicle registration plate (until 2022): ZH
- Website: www.ihrac.sk

Ihráč (Hungarian: Dallos) is a village and municipality in Žiar nad Hronom District in the Banská Bystrica Region of central Slovakia.

== Geography ==
The municipality lies at an altitude of 485 metres (1,591 ft) and covers an area of 20.75 km^{2} (8.01 sq mi) (2025).

== History ==
In historical records, the village was first mentioned in 1388 (Graach). It belonged to Šášov, and in the 17th century to Mine Chamber.

== Population ==
Population statistic (10 years)
Year	1995	2005	2015	2025
Count	582	575	530	462
Difference		−1.20%	−7.82%	−12.83%

Population statistic
Year	2024	2025
Count	465	462
Difference		−0.64%

It has a population of 462 people (31 December 2025).

=== Ethnicity ===
Census 2021 (1+ %)
Ethnicity	Number	Fraction
Slovak	492	98.59%
Not found out	7	1.4%
Total	499	

In year 2021 was 499 people by ethnicity 492 as Slovak, 7 as Not found out and 1 as French.

Note on population: The difference values of population numbers in the table "Population statistic" and in the sections "Ethnicity" & "Religion" is caused by the use of various statistical methods.

=== Religion ===
Census 2021 (1+ %)
Religion	Number	Fraction
Roman Catholic Church	423	84.77%
None	59	11.82%
Not found out	6	1.2%
Christian Congregations in Slovakia	6	1.2%
Total	499	

In year 2021 was 499 people by religion 423 from Roman Catholic Church, 59 from None, 6 from Not found out, 6 from Christian Congregations in Slovakia, 3 from Evangelical Church and 2 from Ad hoc movements.

== Genealogical resources ==
The records for genealogical research are available at the state archive "Statny Archiv in Banska Bystrica, Slovakia"

- Roman Catholic church records (births/marriages/deaths): 1710-1896 (parish B)

== See also ==
- List of municipalities and towns in Slovakia
