= Janova Lehota =

Village and municipality in Slovakia

Janova Lehota Jánosgyarmat
- Municipality
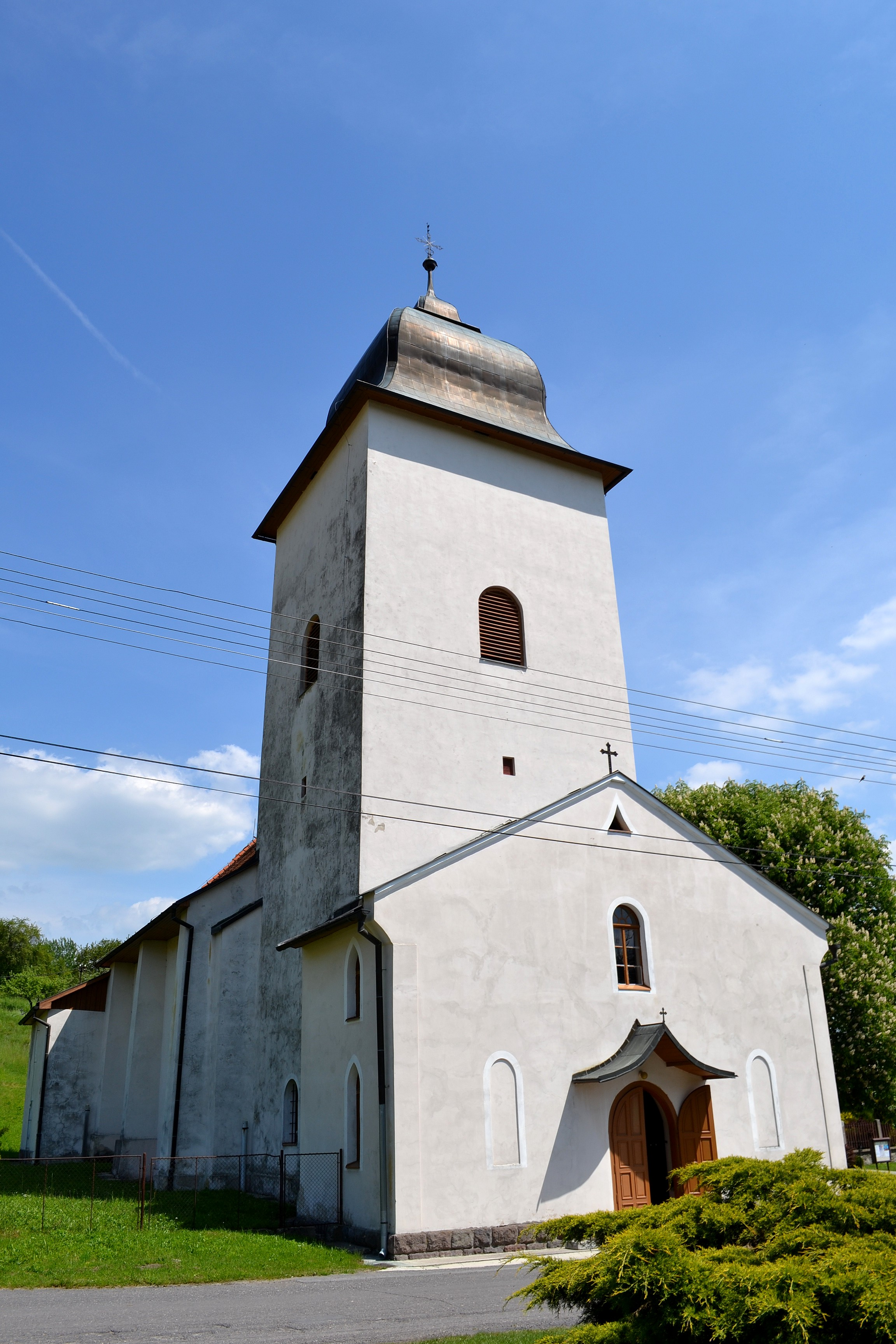

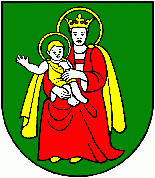
- Flag Coat of arms

- Location of Janova Lehota in the Banská Bystrica Region Location of Janova Lehota in Slovakia
- Coordinates: 48.66°N 18.78°E
- Country: Slovakia
- Region: Banská Bystrica Region
- District: Žiar nad Hronom District
- First mentioned: 1487

Area
  - Total: 17.67 km^{2} (6.82 sq mi)
- Elevation: 418 m (1,371 ft)

Population (2025)
  - Total: 925
- Time zone: UTC+1 (CET)
  - Summer (DST): UTC+2 (CEST)
- Postal code: 966 24
- Area code: +421 45
- Vehicle registration plate (until 2022): ZH
- Website: www.janovalehota.sk

Janova Lehota (German: Drexlerhau, Drechslerhau; Hungarian: Jánosgyarmat) is a village and municipality in Žiar nad Hronom District in the Banská Bystrica Region of central Slovakia.

== Geography ==
The municipality lies at an altitude of 418 metres (1,371 ft) and covers an area of 17.67 km^{2} (6.82 sq mi) (2025).

== History ==
In historical records, the village was first mentioned in 1487 as a German settlement founded by a certain Drexler and belonging to Esztergom archbishopric. In 1776 it passed to Banská Bystrica bishopric.

== Population ==
Population statistic (10 years)
Year	1995	2005	2015	2025
Count	829	860	975	925
Difference		+3.73%	+13.37%	−5.12%

Population statistic
Year	2024	2025
Count	917	925
Difference		+0.87%

It has a population of 925 people (31 December 2025).

=== Ethnicity ===
Census 2021 (1+ %)
Ethnicity	Number	Fraction
Slovak	877	93.39%
Not found out	44	4.68%
Czech	12	1.27%
Total	939	

In year 2021 was 939 people by ethnicity 877 as Slovak, 44 as Not found out, 12 as Czech, 8 as Rusyn, 5 as Ukrainian, 4 as Romani, 4 as German, 1 as Irish, 1 as Vietnamese, 1 as Polish and 1 as Other.

Note on population: The difference values of population numbers in the table "Population statistic" and in the sections "Ethnicity" & "Religion" is caused by the use of various statistical methods.

=== Religion ===
Census 2021 (1+ %)
Religion	Number	Fraction
Roman Catholic Church	601	64%
None	232	24.71%
Not found out	57	6.07%
Evangelical Church	21	2.24%
Total	939	

In year 2021 was 939 people by religion 601 from Roman Catholic Church, 232 from None, 57 from Not found out, 21 from Evangelical Church, 7 from Greek Catholic Church, 6 from Ad hoc movements, 4 from Eastern Orthodox Church, 4 from Paganism and natural spirituality, 2 from Christian Congregations in Slovakia, 1 from Calvinist Church, 1 from Other, 1 from Hinduism, 1 from Czechoslovak Hussite Church and 1 from Buddhism.

== Genealogical resources ==
The records for genealogical research are available at the state archive "Statny Archiv in Banska Bystrica, Slovakia"

- Roman Catholic church records (births/marriages/deaths): 1687-1896 (parish A)

== See also ==
- List of municipalities and towns in Slovakia
