= Kopernica =

Kopernica Barskapronca
- Municipality
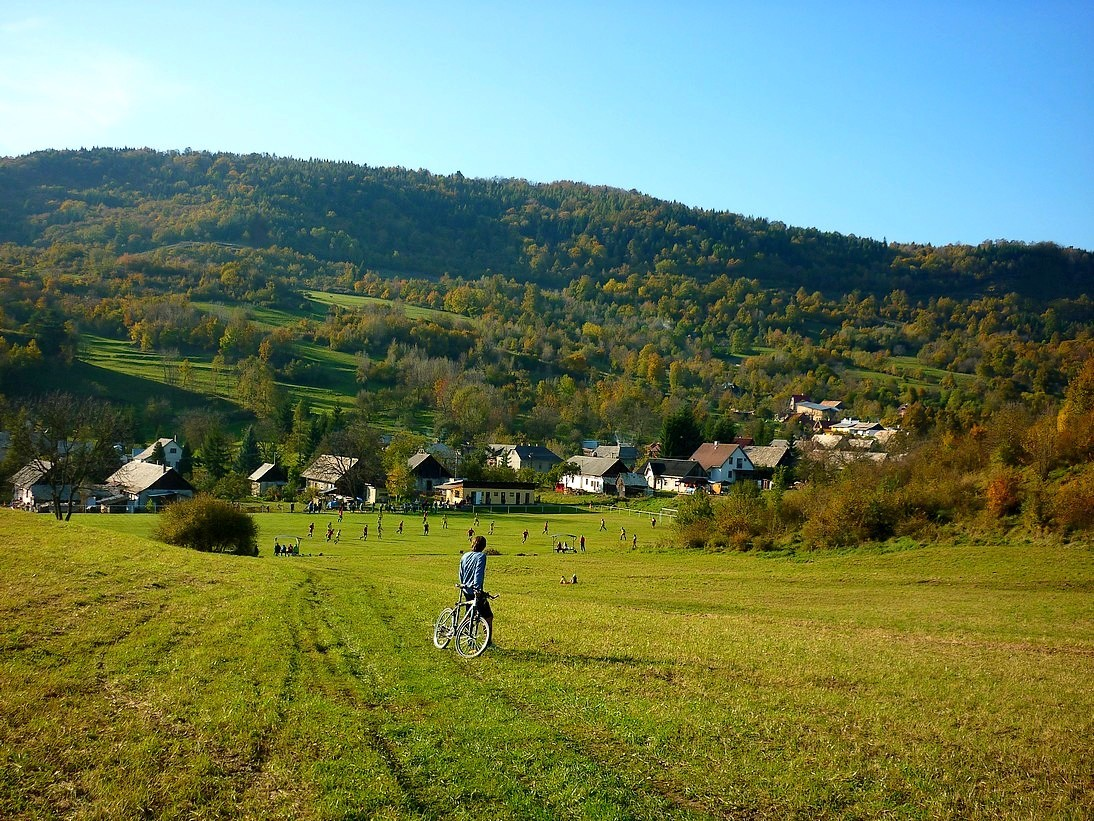

- Flag Coat of arms

- Location of Kopernica in the Banská Bystrica Region Location of Kopernica in Slovakia
- Coordinates: 48.69°N 18.87°E
- Country: Slovakia
- Region: Banská Bystrica Region
- District: Žiar nad Hronom District
- First mentioned: 1444

Government
  - Mayor: Rastislav Slanina (Ind.)

Area
  - Total: 17.56 km^{2} (6.78 sq mi)
- Elevation: 504 m (1,654 ft)

Population (2025)
  - Total: 384

Population by ethnicity (2011)
  - Slovak: 82.6%
  - Roma: 4.7%
  - German: 2.8%
  - Others: 1.2%
  - Unreported: 8.7%

Population by religion (2011)
  - Roman Catholic: 72.3%
  - Jehovah's Witness: 2.1%
  - Others: 0.9%
  - Non-religious: 12%
  - Unreported: 12.7%
- Time zone: UTC+1 (CET)
  - Summer (DST): UTC+2 (CEST)
- Postal code: 967 01
- Area code: +421 45
- Vehicle registration plate (until 2022): ZH
- Website: www.kopernica.sk

Kopernica (German: Deutschlitta; Hungarian: Barskapronca) is a village and municipality in Žiar nad Hronom District in the Banská Bystrica Region of central Slovakia.

== Geography ==
The municipality lies at an altitude of 504 metres (1,654 ft) and covers an area of 17.56 km^{2} (6.78 sq mi) (2025).

== Etymology ==
The name comes from koper (Slovak koper, kôpor: dill) + -nica. "The land where the wild dill grows".

== History ==
The village belonged to a German language island, known as Hauerland. The German population was expelled in 1945.

In 1990, Poor Clares returned to the village and established a new monastery in the municipality.

== Population ==
Population statistic (10 years)
Year	1995	2005	2015	2025
Count	411	431	424	384
Difference		+4.86%	−1.62%	−9.43%

Population statistic
Year	2024	2025
Count	384	384
Difference		+0%

It has a population of 384 people (31 December 2025).

=== Ethnicity ===
Census 2021 (1+ %)
Ethnicity	Number	Fraction
Slovak	372	93.7%
Not found out	18	4.53%
Romani	6	1.51%
Czech	5	1.25%
German	5	1.25%
Total	397	

In year 2021 was 397 people by ethnicity 372 as Slovak, 18 as Not found out, 6 as Romani, 5 as Czech, 5 as German, 1 as Rusyn, 1 as Moravian and 1 as Hungarian.

Note on population: The difference values of population numbers in the table "Population statistic" and in the sections "Ethnicity" & "Religion" is caused by the use of various statistical methods.

=== Religion ===
Census 2021 (1+ %)
Religion	Number	Fraction
Roman Catholic Church	233	58.69%
None	119	29.97%
Not found out	20	5.04%
Evangelical Church	7	1.76%
Jehovah's Witnesses	6	1.51%
Greek Catholic Church	5	1.26%
Total	397	

In year 2021 was 397 people by religion 233 from Roman Catholic Church, 119 from None, 20 from Not found out, 7 from Evangelical Church, 6 from Jehovah's Witnesses, 5 from Greek Catholic Church, 2 from Paganism and natural spirituality, 1 from Calvinist Church, 1 from Christian Congregations in Slovakia, 1 from Other, 1 from Apostolic Church and 1 from Ad hoc movements.

== Notabler personalities ==
- Jozef Pribilinec (born 1960), track and field athlete, racewalker

== See also ==
- List of municipalities and towns in Slovakia
