= Hliník nad Hronom =

Hliník nad Hronom Geletnek
- Municipality
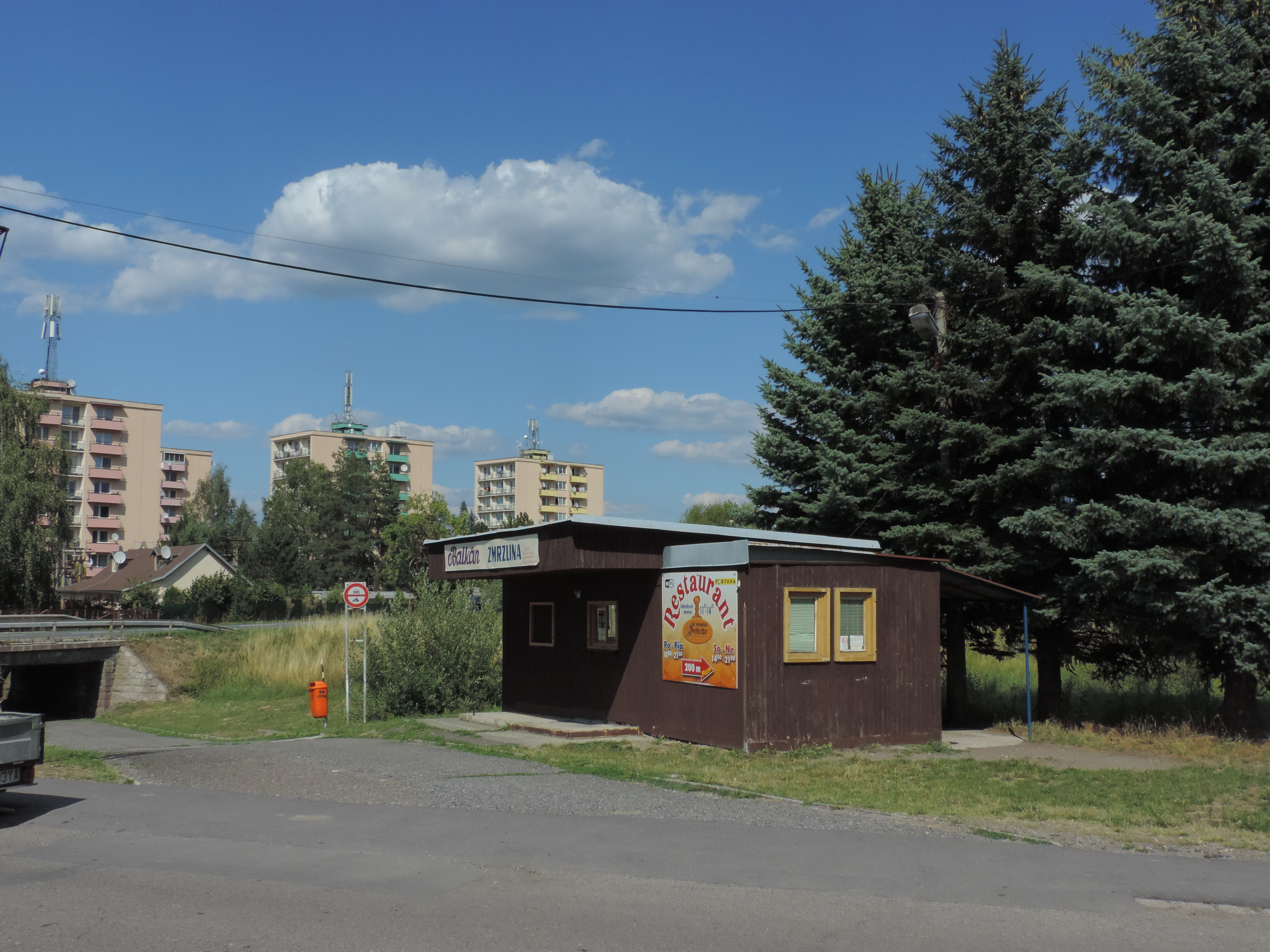

- Flag Coat of arms

- Location of Hliník nad Hronom in the Banská Bystrica Region Location of Hliník nad Hronom in Slovakia
- Coordinates: 48.54°N 18.79°E
- Country: Slovakia
- Region: Banská Bystrica Region
- District: Žiar nad Hronom District
- First mentioned: 1075

Government
  - Mayor: Dominika Kordíková (Independent)

Area
  - Total: 11.33 km^{2} (4.37 sq mi)
- Elevation: 238 m (781 ft)

Population (2025)
  - Total: 2,595

Population by ethnicity (2011)
  - Slovak: 92.5%
  - Czech: 0.3%
  - Roma: 0.2%
  - Hungarian: 0.2%
  - Others: 0.3%
  - Unreported: 6.5%

Population by religion (2011)
  - Roman Catholic: 68.9%
  - Lutheran: 1%
  - Congregationalist: 0.4%
  - Others: 1.5%
  - Non-religious: 18.3%
  - Unreported: 9.9%
- Time zone: UTC+1 (CET)
  - Summer (DST): UTC+2 (CEST)
- Postal code: 966 01
- Area code: +421 45
- Vehicle registration plate (until 2022): ZH
- Website: www.hliniknadhronom.sk

Hliník nad Hronom (Hungarian: Geletnek) is a village and municipality in Žiar nad Hronom District in the Banská Bystrica Region of central Slovakia.

== Geography ==
The municipality lies at an altitude of 238 metres (781 ft) and covers an area of 11.33 km^{2} (4.37 sq mi) (2025).

== Population ==
Population statistic (10 years)
Year	1995	2005	2015	2025
Count	3036	2957	2906	2595
Difference		−2.60%	−1.72%	−10.70%

Population statistic
Year	2024	2025
Count	2640	2595
Difference		−1.70%

It has a population of 2595 people (31 December 2025).

=== Ethnicity ===
Census 2021 (1+ %)
Ethnicity	Number	Fraction
Slovak	2512	92.18%
Not found out	202	7.41%
Total	2725	

In year 2021 was 2725 people by ethnicity 2512 as Slovak, 202 as Not found out, 11 as Czech, 9 as Other, 8 as Romani, 8 as Hungarian, 5 as Russian, 5 as German, 2 as Jewish, 1 as Ukrainian, 1 as Italian, 1 as Rusyn, 1 as Polish and 1 as Moravian.

Note on population: The difference values of population numbers in the table "Population statistic" and in the sections "Ethnicity" & "Religion" is caused by the use of various statistical methods.

=== Religion ===
Census 2021 (1+ %)
Religion	Number	Fraction
Roman Catholic Church	1646	60.4%
None	785	28.81%
Not found out	203	7.45%
Evangelical Church	30	1.1%
Total	2725	

In year 2021 was 2725 people by religion 1646 from Roman Catholic Church, 785 from None, 203 from Not found out, 30 from Evangelical Church, 17 from Christian Congregations in Slovakia, 9 from Greek Catholic Church, 7 from Ad hoc movements, 5 from Calvinist Church, 5 from Other, 4 from Buddhism, 3 from Eastern Orthodox Church, 3 from Paganism and natural spirituality, 3 from Seventh-day Adventist Church, 2 from Czechoslovak Hussite Church, 1 from Other and not ascertained christian church, 1 from Jehovah's Witnesses and 1 from Baptists Church.

== Genealogical resources ==
The records for genealogical research are available at the state archive "Statny Archiv in Banska Bystrica, Slovakia"

- Roman Catholic church records (births/marriages/deaths): 1798-1905 (parish A)
- Lutheran church records (births/marriages/deaths): 1812-1895 (parish B)

== See also ==
- List of municipalities and towns in Slovakia
