= Kunešov =

Kunešov Kunosvágása
- Municipality
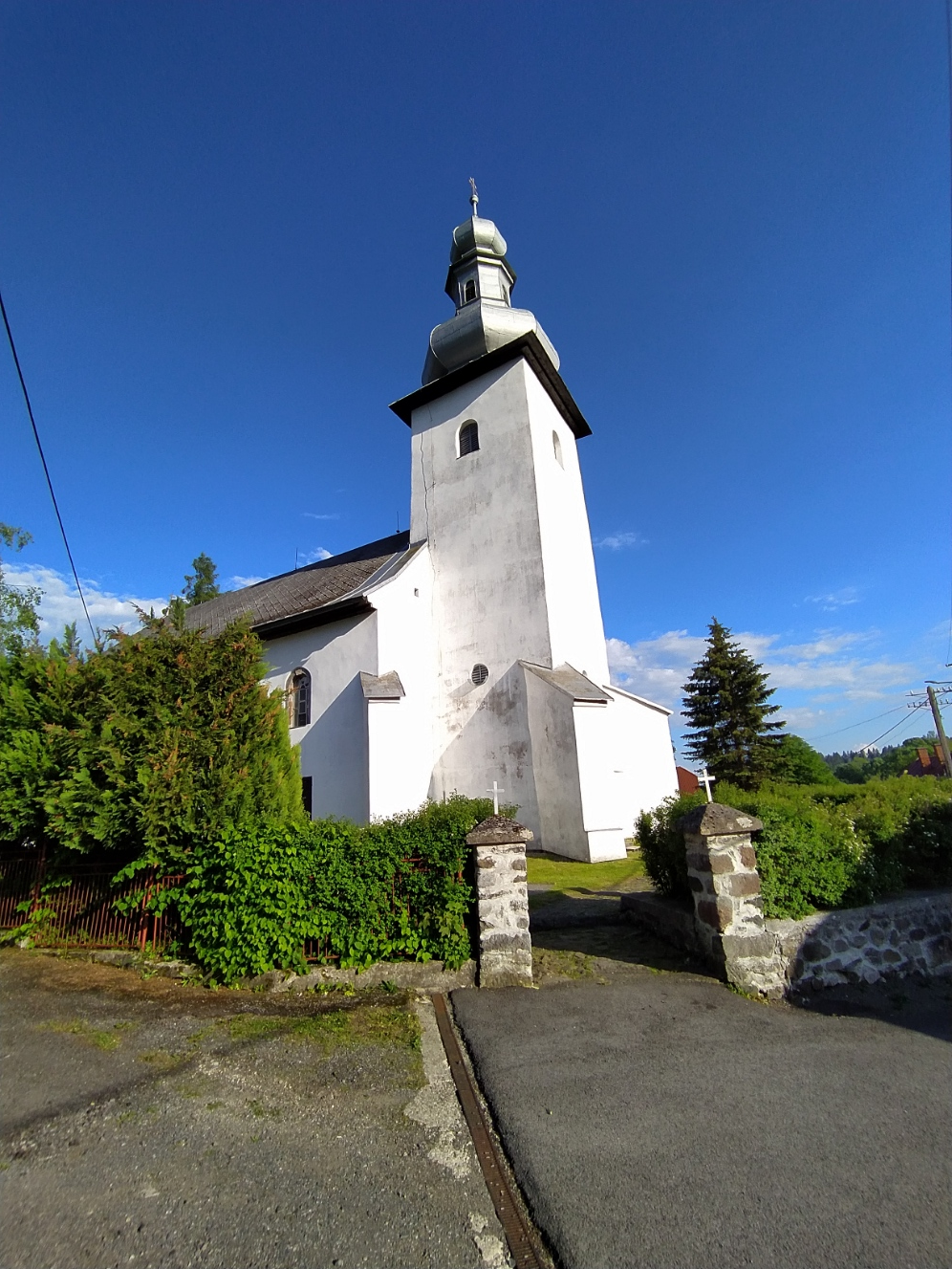

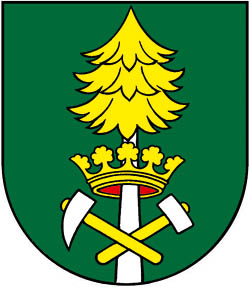
- Flag Coat of arms

- Location of Kunešov in the Banská Bystrica Region Location of Kunešov in Slovakia
- Coordinates: 48.73°N 18.87°E
- Country: Slovakia
- Region: Banská Bystrica Region
- District: Žiar nad Hronom District
- First mentioned: 1342

Government
  - Mayor: Peter Slašťan (Independent)

Area
  - Total: 23.63 km^{2} (9.12 sq mi)
- Elevation: 779 m (2,556 ft)

Population (2025)
  - Total: 190
- Time zone: UTC+1 (CET)
  - Summer (DST): UTC+2 (CEST)
- Postal code: 966 35
- Area code: +421 45
- Vehicle registration plate (until 2022): ZH
- Website: kunesov.sk

Kunešov (German: Kuneschhau; Hungarian: Kunosvágása) is a village and municipality in Žiar nad Hronom District in the Banská Bystrica Region of central Slovakia.

The village once belonged to the German language island of Hauerland but the majority of the German population was expelled at the end of World War II. It still has a German minority (14% according to the 2011 census).

== Geography ==
The municipality lies at an altitude of 779 metres (2,556 ft) and covers an area of 23.63 km^{2} (9.12 sq mi) (2025).

== Population ==
Population statistic (10 years)
Year	1995	2005	2015	2025
Count	258	257	229	190
Difference		−0.38%	−10.89%	−17.03%

Population statistic
Year	2024	2025
Count	197	190
Difference		−3.55%

It has a population of 190 people (31 December 2025).

=== Ethnicity ===
Census 2021 (1+ %)
Ethnicity	Number	Fraction
Slovak	180	89.55%
German	21	10.44%
Not found out	7	3.48%
Total	201	

In year 2021 was 201 people by ethnicity 180 as Slovak, 21 as German, 7 as Not found out, 2 as Czech, 1 as Romani and 1 as Polish.

Note on population: The difference values of population numbers in the table "Population statistic" and in the sections "Ethnicity" & "Religion" is caused by the use of various statistical methods.

=== Religion ===
Census 2021 (1+ %)
Religion	Number	Fraction
Roman Catholic Church	136	67.66%
None	29	14.43%
Not found out	14	6.97%
Evangelical Church	10	4.98%
Greek Catholic Church	8	3.98%
Other	2	1%
Apostolic Church	2	1%
Total	201	

In year 2021 was 201 people by religion 136 from Roman Catholic Church, 29 from None, 14 from Not found out, 10 from Evangelical Church, 8 from Greek Catholic Church, 2 from Other and 2 from Apostolic Church.
