= Slaská =

Slaská Mogyorómál
- Municipality
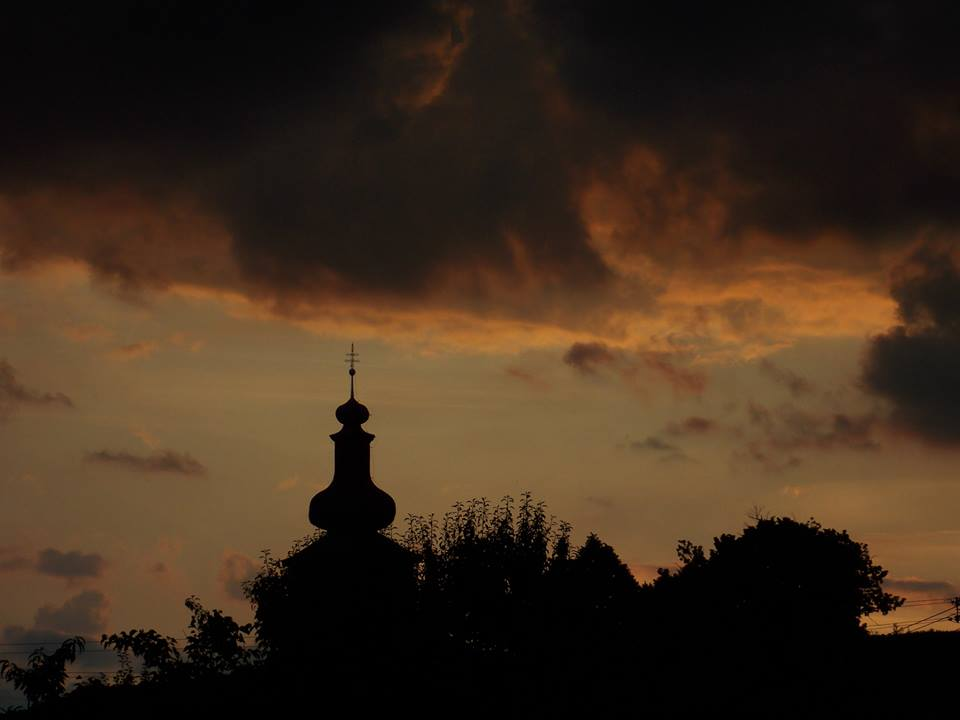
- A view of the Roman Catholic Church of St. Gall in Slaská.

- Flag

- Location of Slaská in the Banská Bystrica Region Location of Slaská in Slovakia
- Coordinates: 48.67°N 18.83°E
- Country: Slovakia
- Region: Banská Bystrica Region
- District: Žiar nad Hronom District
- First mentioned: 1454

Government
  - Mayor: Daniel Gelien (SME Rodina)

Area
  - Total: 16.00 km^{2} (6.18 sq mi)
- Elevation: 395 m (1,296 ft)

Population (2025)
  - Total: 560
- Time zone: UTC+1 (CET)
  - Summer (DST): UTC+2 (CEST)
- Postal code: 966 22
- Area code: +421 45
- Vehicle registration plate (until 2022): ZH
- Website: www.slaska.sk

Slaská (Hungarian: Mogyorómál) is a village and municipality in Žiar nad Hronom District in the Banská Bystrica Region of central Slovakia.

== Geography ==
The municipality lies at an altitude of 395 metres (1,296 ft) and covers an area of 16.00 km^{2} (6.18 sq mi) (2025).

== Population ==
Population statistic (10 years)
Year	1995	2005	2015	2025
Count	467	471	453	560
Difference		+0.85%	−3.82%	+23.62%

Population statistic
Year	2024	2025
Count	549	560
Difference		+2.00%

It has a population of 560 people (31 December 2025).

=== Ethnicity ===
Census 2021 (1+ %)
Ethnicity	Number	Fraction
Slovak	476	93.15%
Not found out	31	6.06%
Czech	8	1.56%
Total	511	

In year 2021 was 511 people by ethnicity 476 as Slovak, 31 as Not found out, 8 as Czech, 5 as Romani, 3 as Polish, 3 as Other, 2 as Hungarian, 1 as Serbian, 1 as Rusyn, 1 as Moravian and 1 as French.

Note on population: The difference values of population numbers in the table "Population statistic" and in the sections "Ethnicity" & "Religion" is caused by the use of various statistical methods.

=== Religion ===
Census 2021 (1+ %)
Religion	Number	Fraction
Roman Catholic Church	309	60.47%
None	148	28.96%
Not found out	29	5.68%
Evangelical Church	7	1.37%
Total	511	

In year 2021 was 511 people by religion 309 from Roman Catholic Church, 148 from None, 29 from Not found out, 7 from Evangelical Church, 5 from Christian Congregations in Slovakia, 4 from Paganism and natural spirituality, 2 from Other and not ascertained christian church, 2 from Other, 2 from Ad hoc movements, 1 from Eastern Orthodox Church, 1 from Jehovah's Witnesses and 1 from Greek Catholic Church.
