= Trnavá Hora =

Trnavá Hora Bezeréte
- Municipality
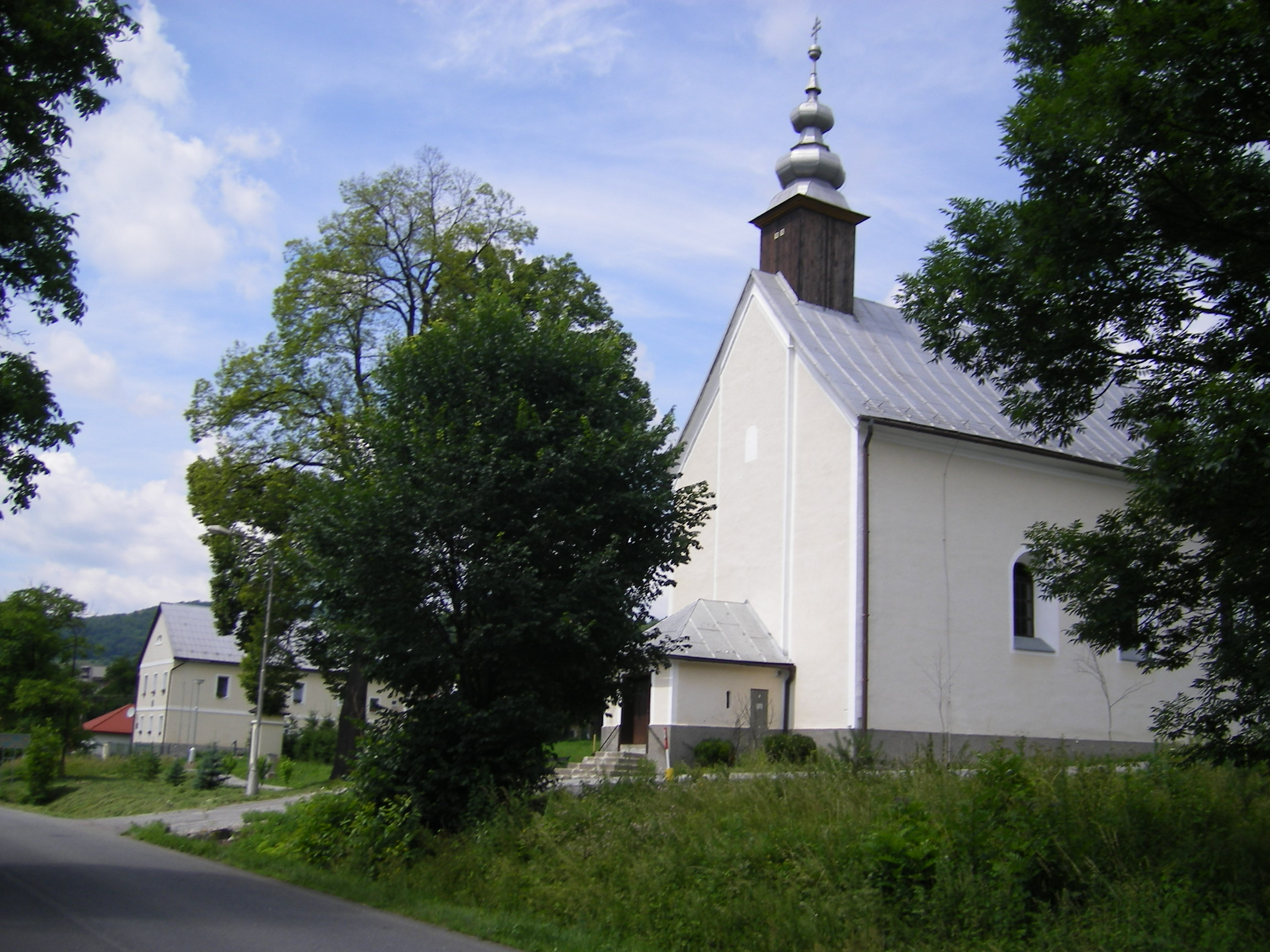

- Flag

- Location of Trnavá Hora in the Banská Bystrica Region Location of Trnavá Hora in Slovakia
- Coordinates: 48.60°N 18.97°E
- Country: Slovakia
- Region: Banská Bystrica Region
- District: Žiar nad Hronom District
- First mentioned: 1388

Government
  - Mayor: Pavel Kravec (Independent)

Area
  - Total: 24.55 km^{2} (9.48 sq mi)
- Elevation: 370 m (1,210 ft)

Population (2025)
  - Total: 1,247

Population by ethnicity (2011)
  - Slovak: 89.4%
  - Roma: 0.3%
  - Czech: 0.2%
  - Others: 0.2%
  - Unreported: 9.9%

Population by religion (2011)
  - Roman Catholic: 72.1%
  - Lutheran: 1.4%
  - Congregationalist: 0.8%
  - Mormon: 0.5%
  - Others: 0.7%
  - Non-religious: 10.5%
  - Unreported: 14%
- Time zone: UTC+1 (CET)
  - Summer (DST): UTC+2 (CEST)
- Postal code: 966 11
- Area code: +421 45
- Vehicle registration plate (until 2022): ZH
- Website: www.trnavahora.sk

Trnavá Hora (Hungarian: Bezeréte) is a village and municipality in Žiar nad Hronom District in the Banská Bystrica Region of central Slovakia.

On the upper part of Trnavá Hora called Kľačany, there is a square of Mekky Žbirka together with a bust of Makky Žbirka - popular Slovak singer who has its roots in Trnavá Hora (his father lived in here).

== Geography ==
The municipality lies at an altitude of 370 metres (1,210 ft) and covers an area of 24.55 km^{2} (9.48 sq mi) (2025).

== Population ==
Population statistic (10 years)
Year	1995	2005	2015	2025
Count	1142	1128	1212	1247
Difference		−1.22%	+7.44%	+2.88%

Population statistic
Year	2024	2025
Count	1257	1247
Difference		−0.79%

It has a population of 1247 people (31 December 2025).

=== Ethnicity ===
Census 2021 (1+ %)
Ethnicity	Number	Fraction
Slovak	1219	98.46%
Not found out	14	1.13%
Total	1238	

In year 2021 was 1238 people by ethnicity 1219 as Slovak, 14 as Not found out, 10 as Czech, 10 as Romani, 7 as Other, 3 as Hungarian, 2 as Russian, 1 as Irish, 1 as Ukrainian, 1 as Serbian, 1 as Rusyn and 1 as German.

Note on population: The difference values of population numbers in the table "Population statistic" and in the sections "Ethnicity" & "Religion" is caused by the use of various statistical methods.

=== Religion ===
Census 2021 (1+ %)
Religion	Number	Fraction
Roman Catholic Church	865	69.87%
None	279	22.54%
Evangelical Church	33	2.67%
Not found out	30	2.42%
Total	1238	

In year 2021 was 1238 people by religion 865 from Roman Catholic Church, 279 from None, 33 from Evangelical Church, 30 from Not found out, 9 from Greek Catholic Church, 6 from Christian Congregations in Slovakia, 4 from Jehovah's Witnesses, 2 from Old Catholic Church, 2 from Islam, 2 from Other, 2 from Ad hoc movements, 1 from Calvinist Church, 1 from Eastern Orthodox Church, 1 from Paganism and natural spirituality and 1 from Other and not ascertained christian church.
