= Dolná Ves =

Dolná Ves Sváb
- Municipality
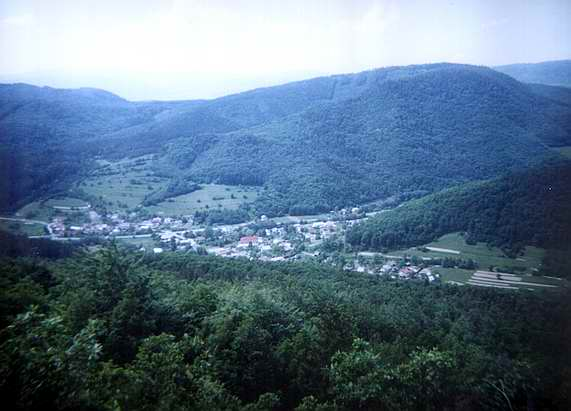
- Dolná Ves as seen from Ďurova Skala

- Flag

- Location of Dolná Ves in the Banská Bystrica Region Location of Dolná Ves in Slovakia
- Coordinates: 48.67°N 18.91°E
- Country: Slovakia
- Region: Banská Bystrica Region
- District: Žiar nad Hronom District
- First mentioned: 1429

Government
  - Mayor: Milan Pračko (Independent)

Area
  - Total: 2.36 km^{2} (0.91 sq mi)
- Elevation: 418 m (1,371 ft)

Population (2025)
  - Total: 236

Population by ethnicity (2011)
  - Slovak: 86%
  - Roma: 1.7%
  - Others: 1.2%
  - Unreported: 11.1%

Population by religion (2011)
  - Roman Catholic: 68.6%
  - Congregationalist: 3.3%
  - Others: 2.5%
  - Non-religious: 12.8%
  - Unreported: 12.8%
- Time zone: UTC+1 (CET)
  - Summer (DST): UTC+2 (CEST)
- Postal code: 966 31
- Area code: +421 45
- Vehicle registration plate (until 2022): ZH
- Website: www.dolnaves.sk

Dolná Ves (before 1948(?): Šváb, older: Šváby; German: Schwabendorf; Hungarian: Sváb) is a village and municipality in Žiar nad Hronom District in the Banská Bystrica Region of central Slovakia. It is near the town of Kremnica.

The first written record about the village is from the year 1427 (Schwabendorff), when the village became the property of Kremnica. Dolná Ves was part of Kremnica in the Middle Ages and from 1808 to 1882. The village was founded by German colonists.

== Geography ==
The municipality lies at an altitude of 418 metres (1,371 ft) and covers an area of 2.36 km^{2} (0.91 sq mi) (2025).

== Population ==
Population statistic (10 years)
Year	1995	2005	2015	2025
Count	227	232	239	236
Difference		+2.20%	+3.01%	−1.25%

Population statistic
Year	2024	2025
Count	234	236
Difference		+0.85%

It has a population of 236 people (31 December 2025).

=== Ethnicity ===
Census 2021 (1+ %)
Ethnicity	Number	Fraction
Slovak	209	95%
Not found out	12	5.45%
Total	220	

In year 2021 was 220 people by ethnicity 209 as Slovak, 12 as Not found out, 2 as Other, 1 as Czech, 1 as Russian and 1 as Hungarian.

Note on population: The difference values of population numbers in the table "Population statistic" and in the sections "Ethnicity" & "Religion" is caused by the use of various statistical methods.

=== Religion ===
Census 2021 (1+ %)
Religion	Number	Fraction
Roman Catholic Church	134	60.91%
None	56	25.45%
Not found out	13	5.91%
Evangelical Church	7	3.18%
Christian Congregations in Slovakia	5	2.27%
Total	220	

In year 2021 was 220 people by religion 134 from Roman Catholic Church, 56 from None, 13 from Not found out, 7 from Evangelical Church, 5 from Christian Congregations in Slovakia, 2 from Jehovah's Witnesses, 1 from Old Catholic Church, 1 from Other and not ascertained christian church and 1 from Ad hoc movements.

== Gallery ==
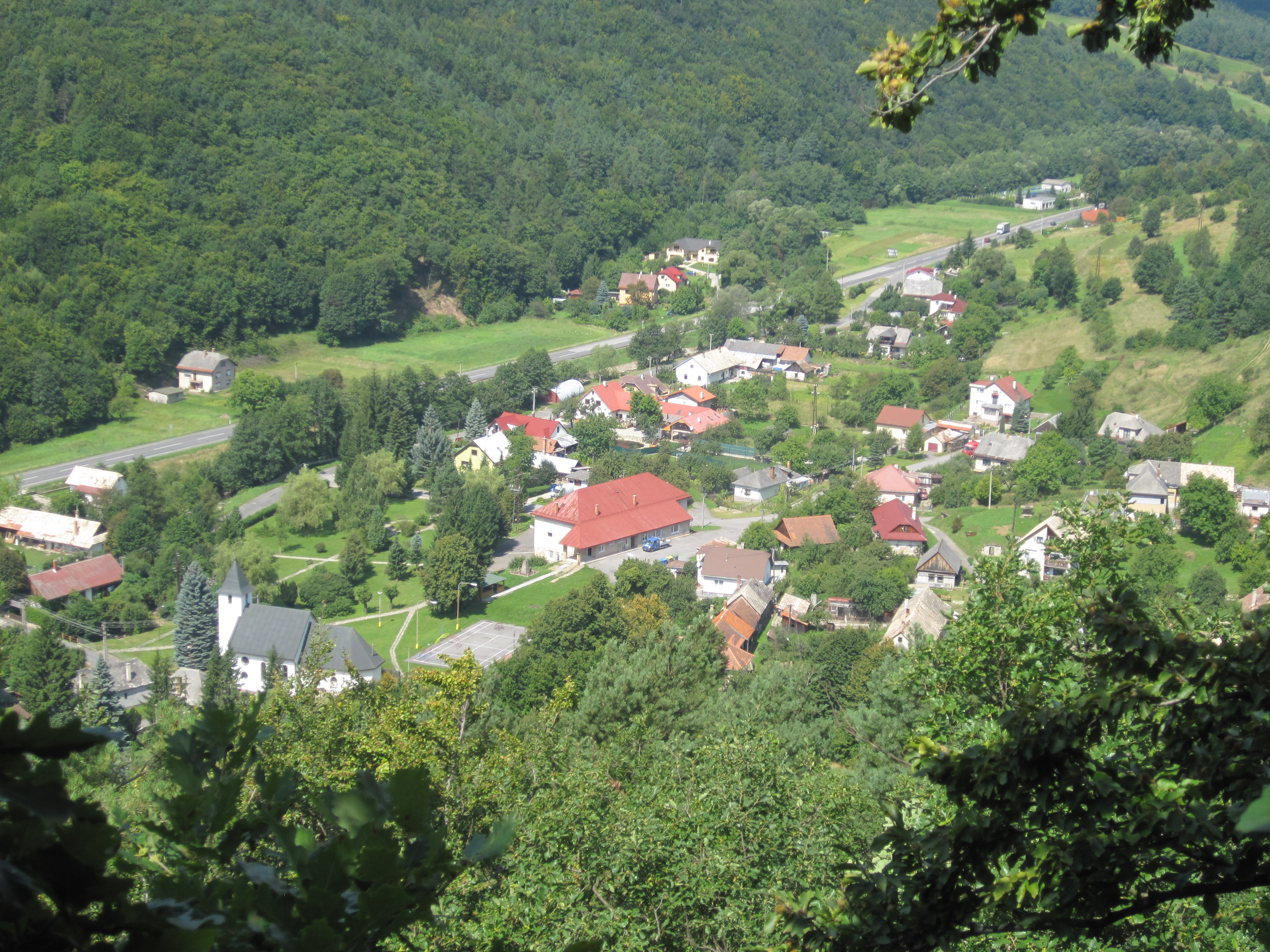
View from a nearby hill

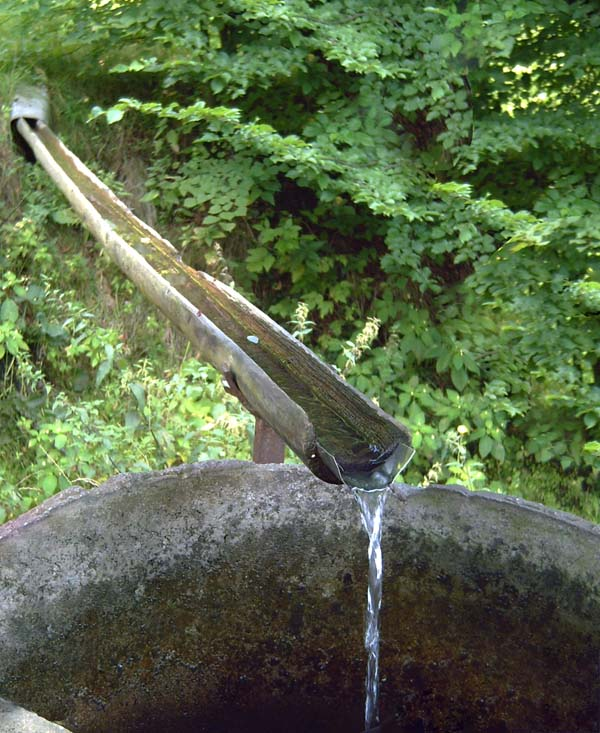
Žliebok

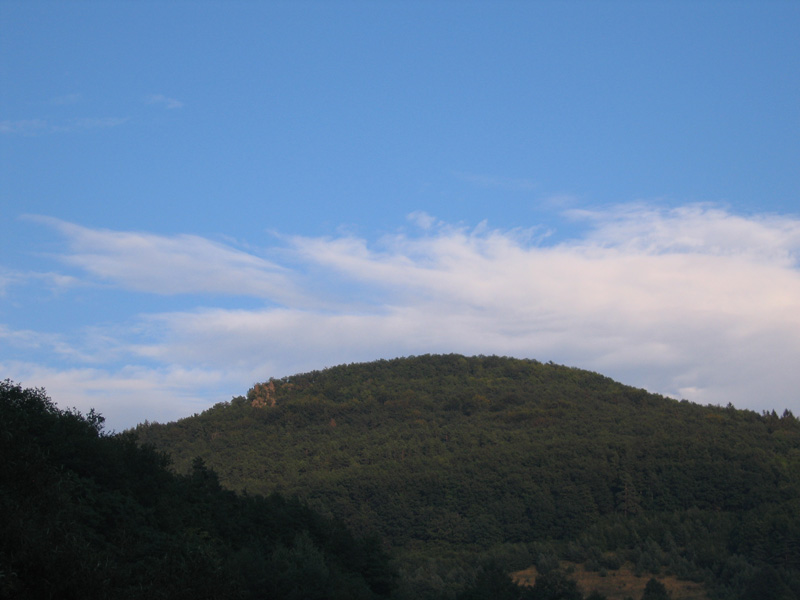
Ďurova Skala, Kremnica Mountains

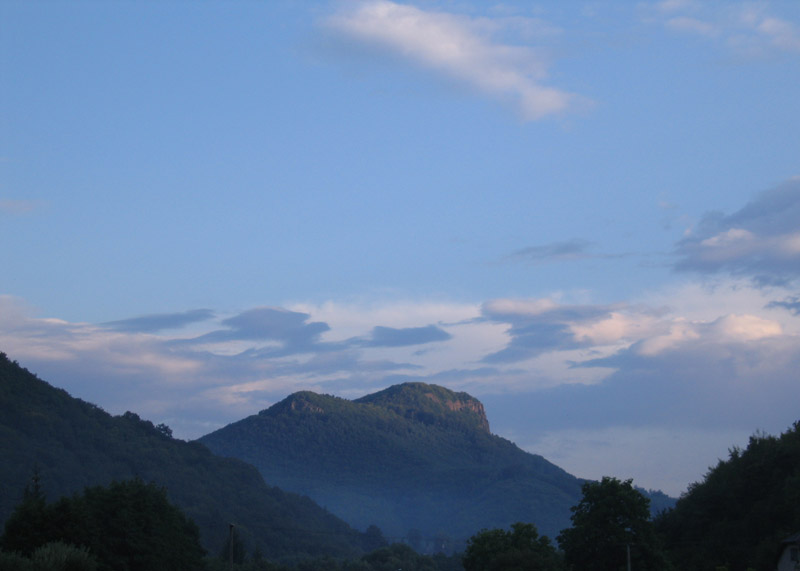
Jastrabská skala, Kremnica Mountains

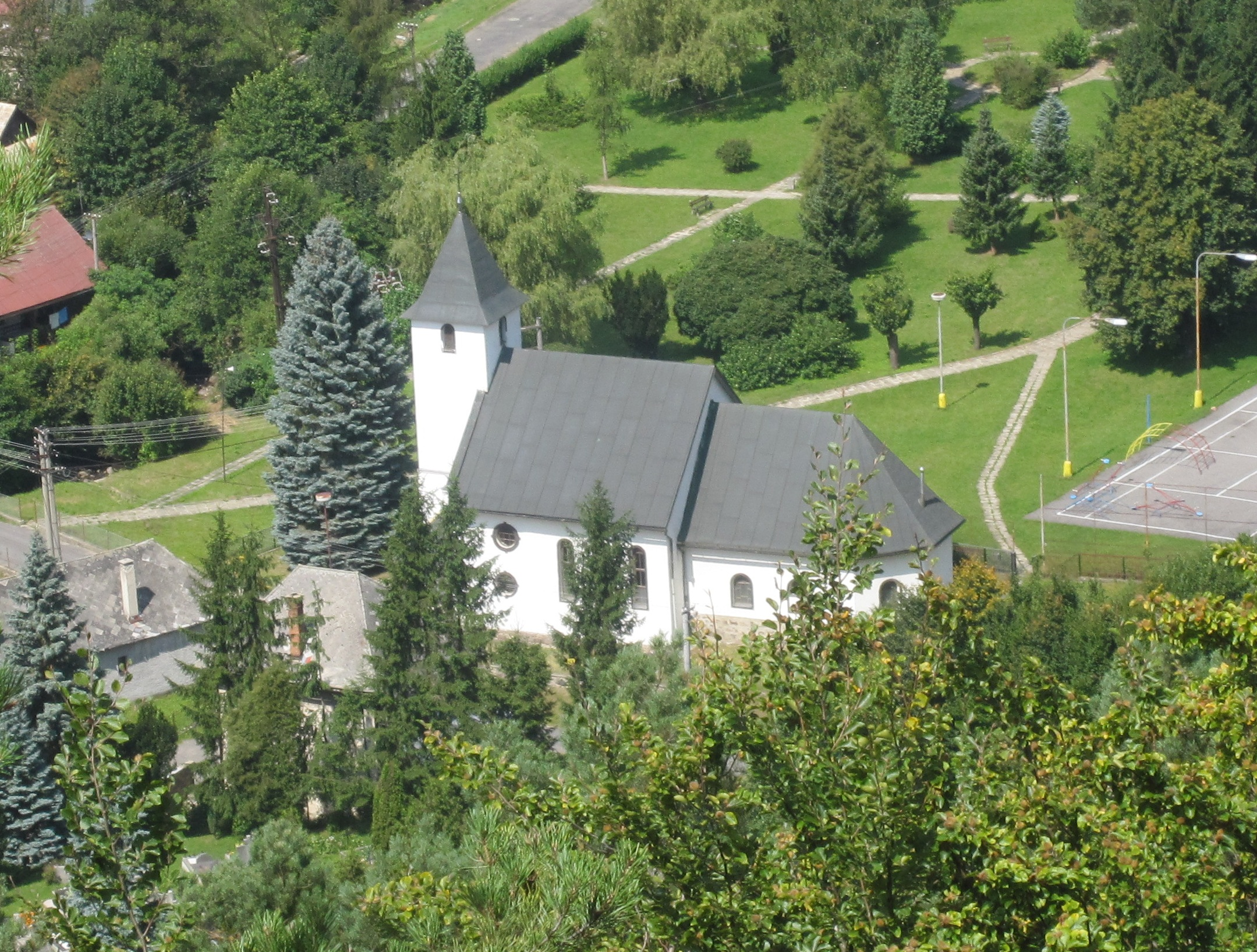
The church

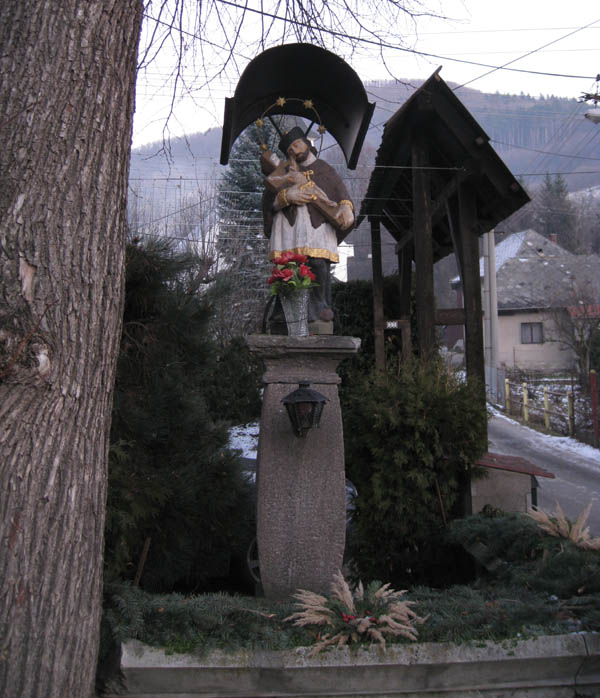
Statue of Saint John Nepomucene

== Genealogical resources ==
The records for genealogical research are available at the state archive "Statny Archiv in Banska Bystrica, Slovakia"

- Roman Catholic church records (births/marriages/deaths): 1674-1913 (parish B)
- Lutheran church records (births/marriages/deaths): 1666-1891 (parish B)

== See also ==
- List of municipalities and towns in Slovakia
