= Lutila =

Lutila Lutilla
- Municipality
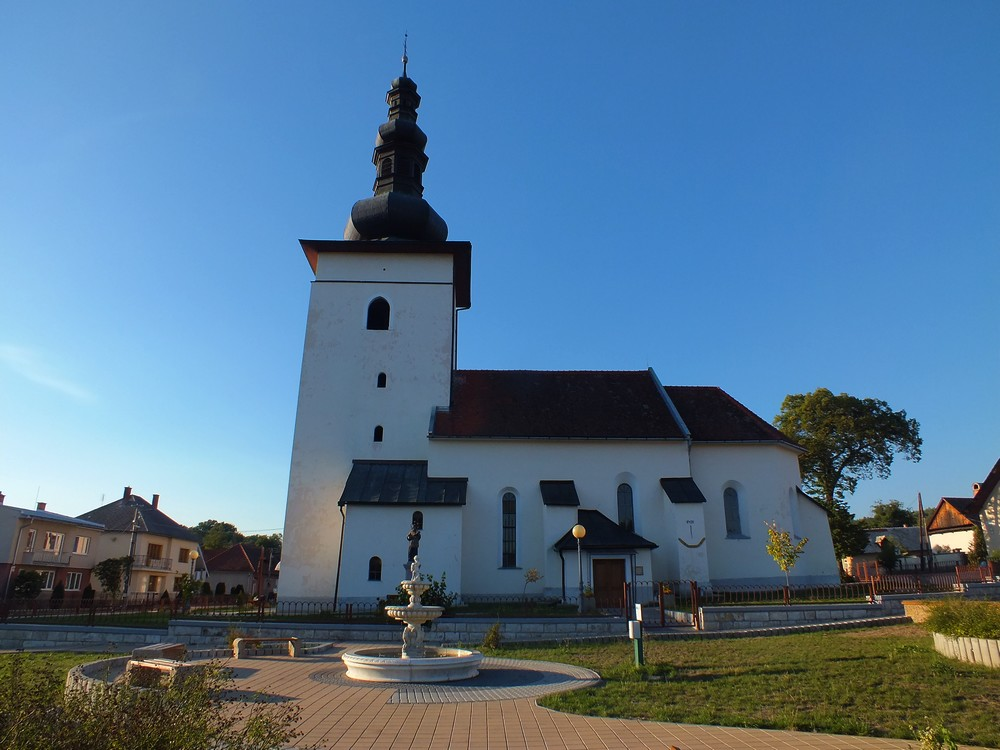
- The Church of Saint Ladislas

- Flag

- Location of Lutila in the Banská Bystrica Region Location of Lutila in Slovakia
- Coordinates: 48.62°N 18.85°E
- Country: Slovakia
- Region: Banská Bystrica Region
- District: Žiar nad Hronom District
- First mentioned: 1487

Government
  - Mayor: Peter Knopp (Ind.)

Area
  - Total: 26.00 km^{2} (10.04 sq mi)
- Elevation: 293 m (961 ft)

Population (2025)
  - Total: 1,381
- Time zone: UTC+1 (CET)
  - Summer (DST): UTC+2 (CEST)
- Postal code: 966 22
- Area code: +421 45
- Vehicle registration plate (until 2022): ZH
- Website: www.lutila.sk

Lutila (Hungarian: Lutilla) is a village and municipality in Žiar nad Hronom District in the Banská Bystrica Region of central Slovakia.

== History ==
In historical records, the village was first mentioned in 1467.

== Geography ==
The municipality lies at an altitude of 293 metres (961 ft) and covers an area of 26.00 km^{2} (10.04 sq mi) (2025).

== Population ==
Population statistic (10 years)
Year	1995	2005	2015	2025
Count	1120	1327	1303	1381
Difference		+18.48%	−1.80%	+5.98%

Population statistic
Year	2024	2025
Count	1382	1381
Difference		−0.07%

It has a population of 1381 people (31 December 2025).

=== Ethnicity ===
Census 2021 (1+ %)
Ethnicity	Number	Fraction
Slovak	1390	97.54%
Not found out	29	2.03%
Total	1425	

In year 2021 was 1425 people by ethnicity 1390 as Slovak, 29 as Not found out, 8 as Czech, 5 as Other, 4 as Russian, 3 as German, 2 as Rusyn, 2 as Hungarian, 1 as Jewish, 1 as Italian and 1 as Moravian.

Note on population: The difference values of population numbers in the table "Population statistic" and in the sections "Ethnicity" & "Religion" is caused by the use of various statistical methods.

=== Religion ===
Census 2021 (1+ %)
Religion	Number	Fraction
Roman Catholic Church	956	67.09%
None	368	25.82%
Evangelical Church	35	2.46%
Not found out	29	2.04%
Total	1425	

In year 2021 was 1425 people by religion 956 from Roman Catholic Church, 368 from None, 35 from Evangelical Church, 29 from Not found out, 7 from Buddhism, 6 from Greek Catholic Church, 6 from Ad hoc movements, 5 from Christian Congregations in Slovakia, 5 from Other, 4 from Hinduism, 3 from Islam and 1 from Calvinist Church.
