= Lúčky, Žiar nad Hronom District =

Lúčky Jánosrét
- Municipality
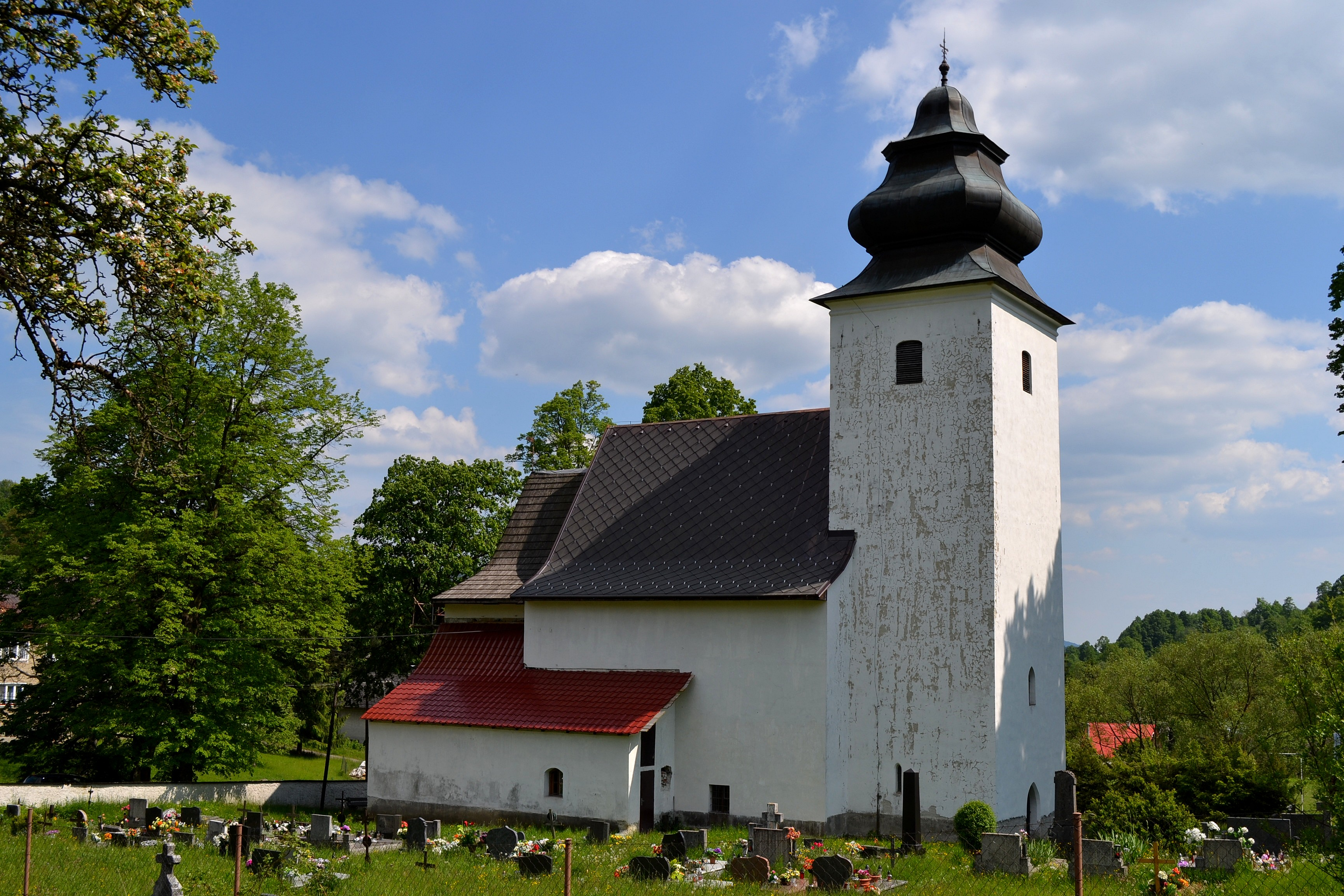

- Flag

- Location of Lúčky in the Banská Bystrica Region Location of Lúčky in Slovakia
- Coordinates: 48.70°N 18.99°E
- Country: Slovakia
- Region: Banská Bystrica Region
- District: Žiar nad Hronom District
- First mentioned: 1429

Area
  - Total: 8.23 km^{2} (3.18 sq mi)
- Elevation: 552 m (1,811 ft)

Population (2025)
  - Total: 189
- Time zone: UTC+1 (CET)
  - Summer (DST): UTC+2 (CEST)
- Postal code: 967 01
- Area code: +421 48
- Vehicle registration plate (until 2022): ZH
- Website: www.luckyprikremnici.sk

Lúčky (German: Honneshau; Hungarian: Jánosrét, until 1890: Lucska) is a village and municipality in the Žiar nad Hronom District of the Banská Bystrica Region of central Slovakia. The town belonged to a German language island. The German population was expelled in 1945.

== Population ==
Population statistic (10 years)
Year	1995	2005	2015	2025
Count	193	218	210	189
Difference		+12.95%	−3.66%	−10%

Population statistic
Year	2024	2025
Count	194	189
Difference		−2.57%

It has a population of 189 people (31 December 2025).

=== Ethnicity ===
Census 2021 (1+ %)
Ethnicity	Number	Fraction
Slovak	187	97.39%
Not found out	5	2.6%
German	2	1.04%
Total	192	

In year 2021 was 192 people by ethnicity 187 as Slovak, 5 as Not found out, 2 as German, 1 as Hungarian and 1 as Other.

Note on population: The difference values of population numbers in the table "Population statistic" and in the sections "Ethnicity" & "Religion" is caused by the use of various statistical methods.

=== Religion ===
Census 2021 (1+ %)
Religion	Number	Fraction
Roman Catholic Church	121	63.02%
None	59	30.73%
Not found out	4	2.08%
Other and not ascertained christian church	3	1.56%
Greek Catholic Church	3	1.56%
Evangelical Church	2	1.04%
Total	192	

In year 2021 was 192 people by religion 121 from Roman Catholic Church, 59 from None, 4 from Not found out, 3 from Other and not ascertained christian church, 3 from Greek Catholic Church and 2 from Evangelical Church.
