= Repište, Slovakia =

Repište Repistye
- Municipality
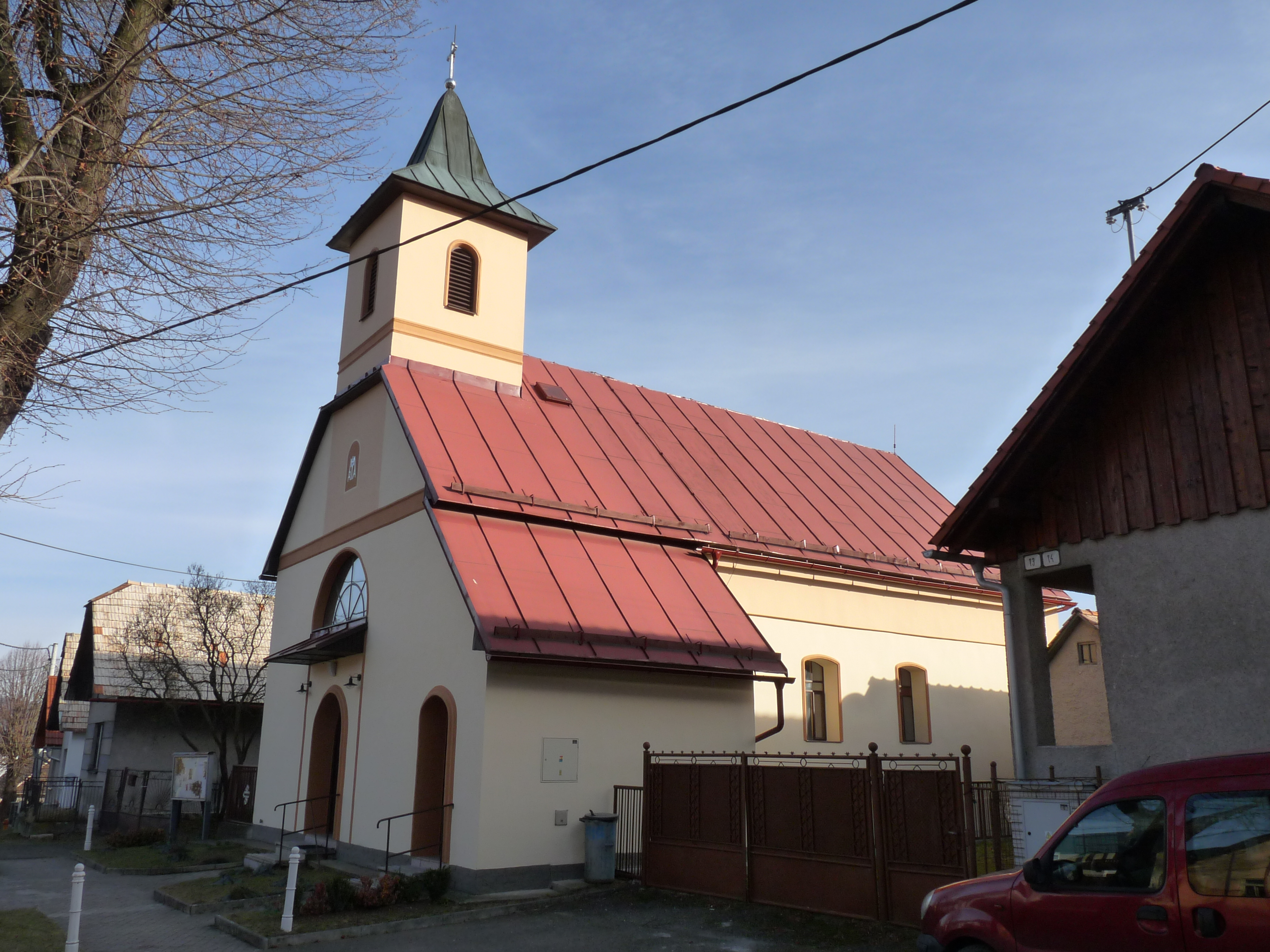

- Flag

- Location of Repište in the Banská Bystrica Region Location of Repište in Slovakia
- Coordinates: 48.52°N 18.85°E
- Country: Slovakia
- Region: Banská Bystrica Region
- District: Žiar nad Hronom District
- First mentioned: 1388

Area
  - Total: 10.38 km^{2} (4.01 sq mi)
- Elevation: 521 m (1,709 ft)

Population (2025)
  - Total: 271
- Time zone: UTC+1 (CET)
  - Summer (DST): UTC+2 (CEST)
- Postal code: 966 03
- Area code: +421 45
- Vehicle registration plate (until 2022): ZH
- Website: www.repiste.sk

Repište (Hungarian: Repistye) is a village and municipality in Žiar nad Hronom District in the Banská Bystrica Region of central Slovakia.

Origin of the name Repište

The name likely stems from the word repa - raddish as the first residents grew it. The first written source regarding the village Repište dates to year 1388. The name of the village had changed over the course of time: The written records from the year 1388 refer to it as Repistia and Repiscia, later in the year 1773 Repisstye, then Repišče in 1786 and finally Repište in the year 1920. The hungarian versions of the name were Repistye and „villa Kespistye“, the former can be found in a tax document dating to the year 1564. The later, „villa Kespistye“, was described as near Pustý hrad (Teplica castle) hill, which belongs to the Šášov castle.

Foundation of Repište village

It is said the settlement was founded by the Číž family, who were charcoal burners as well as lumberjacks. The hamlet was surrounded by forests, which supplied lumber needed for the process of firing charcoal. The first lands inhabited by settlers were called Za diel, Peňažná and Uhlištia, which are historical names still commonly used by the residents. The descendants of the Číž family gradually started cutting down the surrounding forests and therefore gained agricultural land and pastures for livestock. The few houses scattered across the hills were wooden and simple. That was until a glass forge was built in near village Sklené Teplice and drew the settlers closer to the main road, where nowadays is the centre of the village.

History

In 15th century, specifically in the 1424 document, Repište belonged under the ownership of Šášov castle, when king Sigismud of Luxembourg gifted his wife Barbara of Cilli Šášov castle. Later, king Matthias Corvinus gifted the castle to his wife Beatrice of Naples. After his death in the year 1490 the castle became property of Dóczy family until their lineage ended in 1647.

From 17th century to year 1960 Repište was administered by the Chamber of mines-Kammerhof. At that time the settlement had 35 houses, out of which 11 were abandoned. Later on, in 1720 a flour mill and a tavern were present. There were 14 taxpayers half of whom were craftsmen.The number of house increased in the year 1828 to 44 and 281 inhabitants, who were mainly farmers.

In the interwar period, during the first Czechoslovak Republic, denizens worked in agricultural and mining industry. After 2nd World War they worked in neighbouring towns Žiar nad Hronom, Vyhne and Hliník nad Hronom. Up until the year 1960 it was governed by Banská Bystrica district, Tekov county, Nová Baňa municipality. After the year 1960 it belonged Žiar nad Hronom municipality and Stredoslovenský district.

== Geography ==
The municipality lies at an altitude of 521 metres (1,709 ft) and covers an area of 10.38 km^{2} (4.01 sq mi) (2025).

== Population ==
Population statistic (10 years)
Year	1995	2005	2015	2025
Count	334	305	290	271
Difference		−8.68%	−4.91%	−6.55%

Population statistic
Year	2024	2025
Count	277	271
Difference		−2.16%

It has a population of 271 people (31 December 2025).

=== Ethnicity ===
Census 2021 (1+ %)
Ethnicity	Number	Fraction
Slovak	271	98.18%
Not found out	4	1.44%
Total	276	

In year 2021 was 276 people by ethnicity 271 as Slovak, 4 as Not found out, 1 as Czech, 1 as Rusyn, 1 as Hungarian and 1 as Albanian.

Note on population: The difference values of population numbers in the table "Population statistic" and in the sections "Ethnicity" & "Religion" is caused by the use of various statistical methods.

=== Religion ===
Census 2021 (1+ %)
Religion	Number	Fraction
Roman Catholic Church	239	86.59%
None	29	10.51%
Not found out	3	1.09%
Evangelical Church	3	1.09%
Total	276	

In year 2021 was 276 people by religion 239 from Roman Catholic Church, 29 from None, 3 from Not found out, 3 from Evangelical Church, 1 from Paganism and natural spirituality and 1 from Czechoslovak Hussite Church.
