= Horná Ves, Žiar nad Hronom District =

Horná Ves Felsőtóti
- Municipality
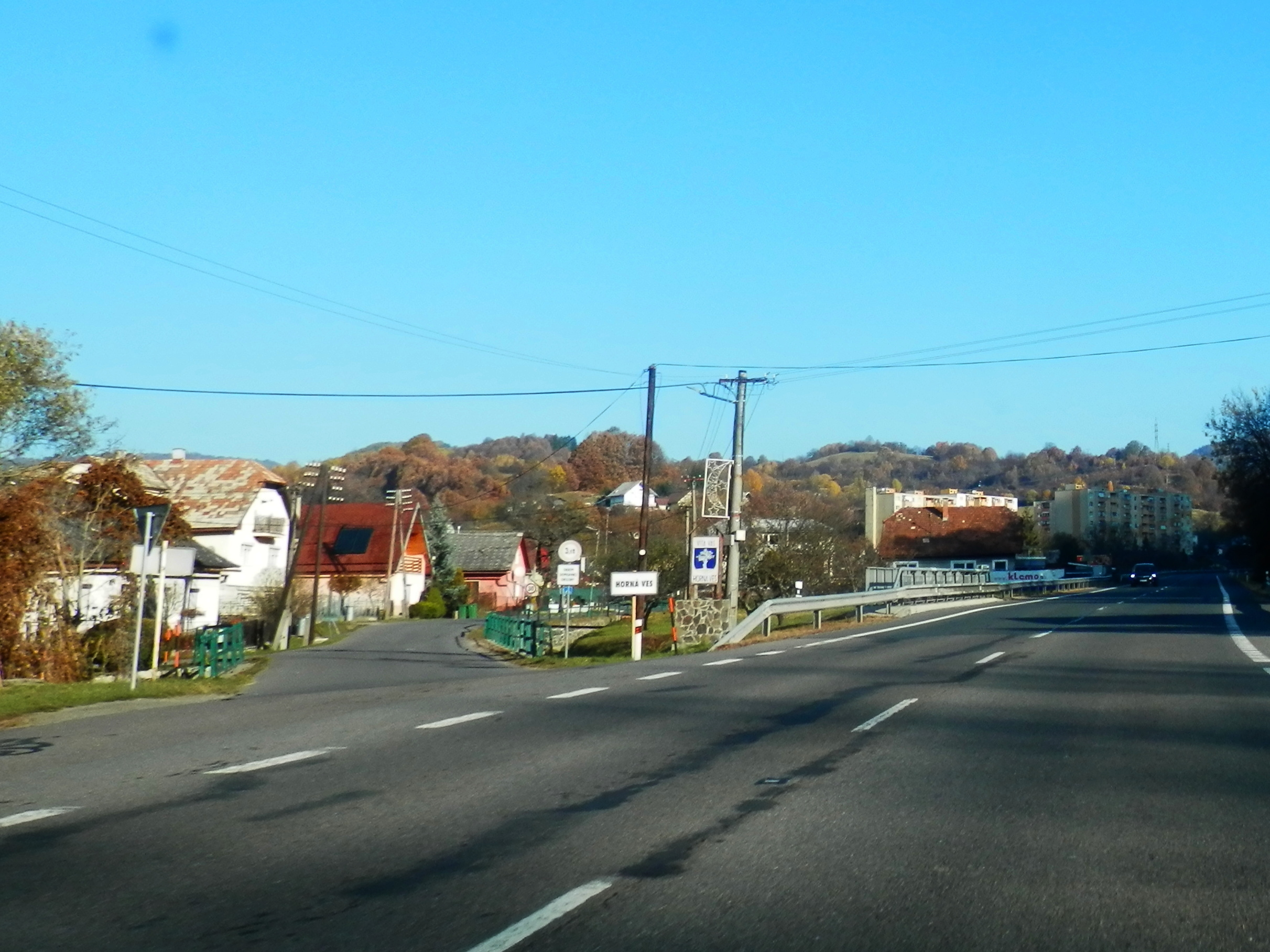

- Flag

- Location of Horná Ves in the Banská Bystrica Region Location of Horná Ves in Slovakia
- Coordinates: 48.68°N 18.91°E
- Country: Slovakia
- Region: Banská Bystrica Region
- District: Žiar nad Hronom District
- First mentioned: 1429

Government
  - Mayor: Michal Mecele (Independent)

Area
  - Total: 0.00 km^{2} (0 sq mi)
- Elevation: 439 m (1,440 ft)

Population (2025)
  - Total: 634
- Time zone: UTC+1 (CET)
  - Summer (DST): UTC+2 (CEST)
- Postal code: 967 01
- Area code: +421 45
- Vehicle registration plate (until 2022): ZH
- Website: www.obechornaves.sk

Horná Ves (Hungarian: Felsőtóti) is a village and municipality in Žiar nad Hronom District in the Banská Bystrica Region of central Slovakia.

== Population ==
Population statistic (10 years)
Year	1995	2005	2015	2025
Count	0	731	711	634
Difference		–	−2.73%	−10.82%

Population statistic
Year	2024	2025
Count	642	634
Difference		−1.24%

It has a population of 634 people (31 December 2025).

=== Ethnicity ===
Census 2021 (1+ %)
Ethnicity	Number	Fraction
Slovak	642	95.11%
Not found out	29	4.29%
Total	675	

In year 2021 was 675 people by ethnicity 642 as Slovak, 29 as Not found out, 6 as Czech, 3 as Hungarian, 1 as Romani and 1 as German.

Note on population: The difference values of population numbers in the table "Population statistic" and in the sections "Ethnicity" & "Religion" is caused by the use of various statistical methods.

=== Religion ===
Census 2021 (1+ %)
Religion	Number	Fraction
Roman Catholic Church	362	53.63%
None	236	34.96%
Not found out	29	4.3%
Evangelical Church	23	3.41%
Christian Congregations in Slovakia	8	1.19%
Total	675	

In year 2021 was 675 people by religion 362 from Roman Catholic Church, 236 from None, 29 from Not found out, 23 from Evangelical Church, 8 from Christian Congregations in Slovakia, 3 from Calvinist Church, 3 from Greek Catholic Church, 3 from Church of the Brethren, 3 from Ad hoc movements, 2 from Buddhism, 1 from Paganism and natural spirituality, 1 from Other and not ascertained christian church and 1 from Other.

== Genealogical resources ==
The records for genealogical research are available at the state archive "Statny Archiv in Banska Bystrica, Slovakia"

- Roman Catholic church records (births/marriages/deaths): 1674-1913 (parish B)

== See also ==
- List of municipalities and towns in Slovakia
