= List of rail accidents (1940–1949) =

This is a list of rail accidents from 1940 to 1949.

== 1940 ==
- January 29 – Japan – At Ajikawaguchi Station in Osaka, a crowded commuter train crashes into gasoline tank cars, and burns; about 181 passengers die, and different sources give the number injured as 82, 92, 100, or 669.
- February 4 – United Kingdom – A train runs into a landslip at Watford Tunnel, Hertfordshire and is derailed. One person dies, six are injured.
- late February – Mexico – An express en route to the United States collides with a freight train at Querétaro, results in the deaths of 20 people.
- March 4 – Japan – In Yamagata Prefecture, a train emerges from a tunnel onto a bridge that has been destroyed by an avalanche. The locomotive and leading cars fall 75 feet (23 m), results in the deaths of 37 people.
- March 5 – Finland – During the Winter War, children are being evacuated to neutral Sweden. At Iitala, near Tampere, during a blizzard, an evacuation train on the Helsinki-to-Tornio line collides head-on with a train that overran signals, and catches fire. Of the 21 people dead, 16 were children (including three from one family) and two were mothers.
- March 12 – Finland – Turenki rail accident – Turenki: A troop train and a freight train collide after being let on the same piece of track by mistake, leaving 39 people dead and 69 injured. This is still the worst train accident in Finland's history.
- March 14 – United States – Alamo, Texas: An oncoming train collides with a truck carrying more than 40 agricultural workers, results in the deaths of 34 people ranging in ages from ten to 48. The collision at the railroad crossing on Tower Road resulted in the most deaths on a Texas highway in the 20th century. A historical marker has been added to commemorate the passing of the great agricultural workers as well as a gathering during this time yearly.
- March 17 – Yugoslavia – A train on the line connecting Karlovac (now in Croatia) and Ljubljana (now in Slovenia) is derailed by a landslide between Ozalj and nearby Zaluka (both now in Croatia); 20 die.
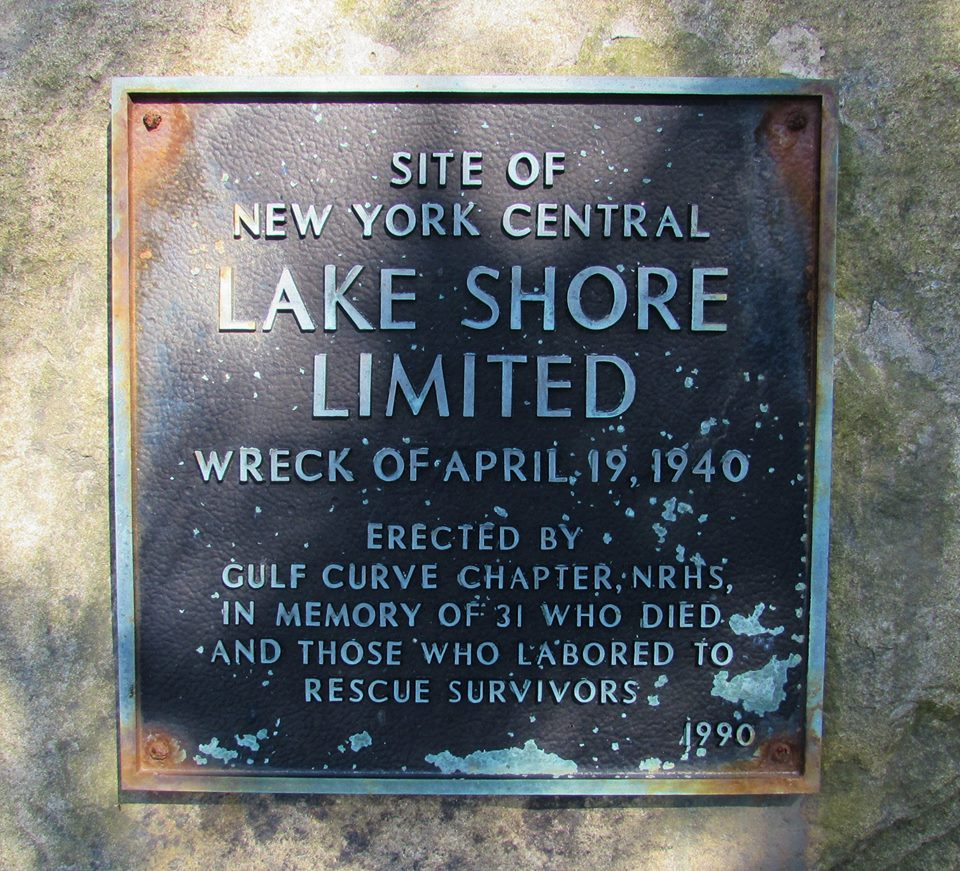
- Memorial plaque for 1940 Lakeshore Limited derailment in Little Falls, New York.
  April 19 – United States – Little Falls Gulf Curve crash of 1940 – Little Falls, New York: The New York Central Lake Shore Limited, running from New York City to Chicago derails due to excessive speed on a curve resulting in the deaths of 31 and injuring nearly 140. The train had left Albany 21 minutes behind schedule and the engineer was trying to make up time.
- May 5 – France – A train from Paris to Montluçon is wrecked when a flood-weakened bridge collapses under it between Épineuil-le-Fleuriel and Vallon-en-Sully; 33 die and 46 are seriously injured.
- May 18 – France – Morgny-la-Pommeraye: During the mass movement of people resulting from the German invasion of Belgium, a train of Belgian refugees collides with a train of French refugees, resulting in the deaths of 53 people and injuring 128; the driver at fault is prosecuted for negligent homicide.
- July 31 – United States – Doodlebug disaster – Cuyahoga Falls, Ohio, United States: The PRR "Doodlebug", a gasoline-electric interurban car, fails to take a siding and collides with an oncoming freight, causing the gas tanks to explode. The crew jump before the crash; all 43 passengers die as the wreck burns too intensely to allow rescuers near for half an hour. A federal investigation suggests the Doodlebug's driver had become disoriented due to carbon monoxide in a poorly ventilated cab.
- August 5 – British India – The Dacca Mail (Dacca is now Dhaka, Bangladesh) on the Eastern Bengal Railway is derailed at Jairampur, 80 miles (130 km) from Calcutta (now Kolkata) by track sabotage; 34 people dead and 50 injured.
- October 14 – United Kingdom – A London Midland and Scottish Railway express passenger train derails at Wembley, Middlesex when a platform barrow falls onto the track. A number of people die and many are injured.
- November 4 – United Kingdom – 1940 Norton Fitzwarren rail crash: A Great Western Railway train driver reads the signals for the main track when his train is on the relief track that ends there, and runs off the end of it. Coaches telescope, resulting in the deaths of 27 and injuring 75. Contributory causes include a nonstandard placement of signals and the invisibility of the tracks during the wartime blackout.
- November 14 – German-occupied Belgium – A train from Tienen collides with a stationary train in Diegem station, just outside Brussels; 21 die.
- November 19 – German-occupied Norway – Hommelvik train collision: Freight and passenger trains collide in Malvik Municipality, 10 miles (16 km) east of Trondheim; 22 die. Sabotage is suspected.
- December 3 – Spain – Velilla de Ebro: A westbound express from Barcelona is supposed to wait on a side track for an express from Madrid to Barcelona, but overshoots and the trains collide head-on at 4:00 am in −10 °C (14 °F) weather, killing 47 people and injuring at least 64.
- December 19 – United States – The Seaboard Air Line Sunbeam and an Atlantic Coast Line freight collide at a right-angle crossing at Zephyrhills, Florida, killing Benjamin J. Green, engineer of the Sunbeam, in his cab, and injuring ten of the passengers and crew. "Trainmen on both railroads said they did not know what caused the accident, but believed the automatic signals had gone wrong. Normally, the passenger train would have had the right of way, they said."
- December(?) – Mexico – A repair train derails near Iguala and falls down a cliff. There are 71 deaths.

== 1941 ==
- January 6 – Hungary – An accident at Berettyóújfalu kills 20 soldiers.
- January 23 - Norway - Meråker train derailment, in Meråker Municipality, Norway, a freight train derailed on the Meråker line, 2 people were killed.
- February 10 – United Kingdom – A London and North Eastern Railway passenger train overruns signals and runs into the rear of an express train at Harold Wood, Essex. Seven people are killed and seventeen are seriously injured.
- February 15 – Spain – During a storm, an electric train on the metre-gauge railway from San Sebastián to Bilbao loses power and stops on a bridge at Zumaia. Then the wind increases and blows three cars of the train off the bridge and into the river below, killing 20 people and injuring over 100.
- February 21 – United States – Piedmont & Northern train no. 5, westbound through a curve near Fairmont Station, eight miles (13 km) west of Spartanburg, South Carolina, strikes rear of stopped freight. Flagman jumps from electric ex-Pennsylvania Railroad combine no. 350 before impact with steel caboose, but engineer killed. Fifteen other passengers in following ex-PRR trailer are injured.
- mid-March – Chile – An accident at Calera kills 20 people and injures at least 60.
- April 23 – Uganda Protectorate – A derailment near Kampala kills 20 people.
- April 28 – United Kingdom – The three rear cars of an 11-car London and North Eastern Railway express train from London to Newcastle are reserved for a party of about 100 teenage boys returning to Ampleforth College. Some of the boys begin playing with matches, accidentally starting a fire, but not initially understanding its severity. By the time the train is stopped at Westborough, the fire is spreading to all three cars, which are destroyed. Six of the boys are killed, including two sons of Hubert Pierlot, the Prime Minister in Exile of Belgium; seven more are injured.
- May(?) – Japanese Taiwan – At Kyujo, freight train from Takao (now Kaohsiung) crashes head-on into a passenger train from Keelung; 200 people are killed or injured.
- May 3 – United States – A freight train, pulled by Southern Pacific class AC-8 locomotive no. 4199, travelling at 40 miles per hour (64 km/h) on the Southern Pacific's Coast Division suffers a catastrophic boiler explosion at Cooper, California. Four people are killed.
- July 2 – United Kingdom – An express train and a freight train collide at Slough, Buckinghamshire. Five people are killed and 25 are injured.
- July 20 – Italy – On a viaduct near Como, an object protruding from a freight train smashes into a passenger train carrying workers to Germany; 30 are killed.
- July 24 – Canada – a regular Great Northern Railway passenger train–led by Great Northern H-5 class No. 1351–collided head-on with the second section of a Canadian National Railway Transcontinental train–led by Canadian National S-1-d class No. 3377–on a single-track mainline in the Brunette Valley near New Westminster, British Columbia; two people were killed, three were severely injured, and 21 passengers and crew received minor injuries.
- August 9 – Canada – a Canadian National Railways passenger train collides with a stationary engine at the Turcot Yards, Montreal, Quebec; the fireman is killed and the engineer is severely injured in the resulting boiler explosion. 53 of the passengers are injured.
- September 8 – A passenger interurban car along the Interstate Public Service line between Indianapolis and Seymour, Indiana collided with a work train south of Columbus, Indiana — the passenger car's motorman and a passenger would eventually succumb to their injuries as a result. Service ceased after the crash and was never restarted; this would be the end of the Indiana Railroad as well as interurban service to Indianapolis in general.
- September 16 – Japan – Aboshi Station: an express from Tokyo runs past signals and crashes into a stationary train for Kyoto; 63 people are killed and 67 injured, 19 seriously, and the driver of the express is detained by police.
- November 2 – France – At Paris Austerlitz station, an express from Orléans crashes into an empty train, killing 21 and injuring 7.
- November – United States – A Southern Pacific freight train suffers a break-in-two and the automatic emergency brake application stops the locomotive, a Southern Pacific class AC-8 cab-forward no. 4193 in Hasson Tunnel. The crew are asphyxiated, while the locomotive cooks on low flame for 36 hours before the oil-fuel shut-off valve between the locomotive and its tender can be reached.
- December 3 – Canada – A Canadian Pacific Railway train approaching Ottawa suddenly leaves the tracks, resulting in the death of the locomotive engineer and injuring 29 others.
- December 21 – Italy – An accident to the funicular on Mount Vesuvius kills 25 people.
- December 27 – Germany – In a snowstorm, a Berlin-Warsaw express crashes into a stationary freight train at Leichholz station (now Drzewce, Poland) between Frankfurt an der Oder and Posen (now Poznań, Poland). There are 44 deaths, although eye-witness accounts report higher numbers.
- December 28 – German-occupied France – On the line between Armentières and Berguettes (now Isbergues), two passenger trains collide head-on between Laventie and La Gorgue. One source says 56 people are killed and 40 injured; another says from 67 to perhaps over 100 dead.
- December 30 – United Kingdom – Eccles rail crash; A westbound passenger train passes signals at danger in fog in the wartime blackout and collides with an eastbound train at 30 mph (48 km/h); 23 killed.

== 1942 ==
- February 13 – United Kingdom – On the Holbrook colliery siding near Beighton on the London and North Eastern Railway, uncoupled freight cars are being shunted. A load of seven metal plates each weighing 25 long hundredweight (1,300 kg) and 8 feet 7 inches (2.62 m) wide is being carried on a car 8 feet 4 3/8 inches (2.550 m) wide by loading them on a slight diagonal, a common practice for plates up to 8 feet 8 1/2 inches (2.654 m) wide. The shunt is too rough and the impact shifts one plate enough to foul the adjacent track, but this is not noticed. It contacts a 13-car troop train moving at 35 miles per hour (56 km/h) on the Nottingham-Sheffield main line and smashes into the cars. Of about 400 passengers, 14 soldiers are killed and 35 require hospitalization.
- May 16 – British India – In what is now Pakistan, Hurs sabotage the track to derail the Punjab Mail train to Lahore between Tando Adam Khan and nearby Odero Lal, derailing the locomotive and 6 cars. The dacoits then attack the passengers and steal their valuables. Altogether 22 people are killed, including a minister of the Sindh government, and 26 injured.
- September 4 – United Kingdom – A London Midland and Scottish Railway freight train is derailed by trap points at Todmorden, Yorkshire because the driver misses signals under blackout conditions. Both locomotive crew are injured.
- October 17 – China – Some 500 Japanese are killed or injured when a troop train hits a Chinese mine near Shanhsiatu in northern Kiangsi (now Jiangxi) province.
- November 4 – United Kingdom – a Southern Railway electric multiple unit runs into the rear of another at Waddon, Surrey due to a signalman's error. Two people are killed.
- November 22 – United States – Three persons were killed and many others injured in a wreck of the Royal Palm (train) passenger train on a flaming trestle near Valdosta. About 20 persons were hospitalized. The Southbound train's two engines passed over the trestle spanning a small stream, but two mail cars and the first six-passenger coaches were derailed. Most of them overturned down a 12-foot (4 m) embankment. One fell into the one-foot-deep (30 cm) Withlacoochee river. The last two of the ten coaches remained on the tracks. There was no official explanation of the fire which was eating away at the short wooden trestle.
- December 27 – Canada – In bad weather at Almonte, Ontario, on the Canadian Pacific Railway, a passenger train en route from Chalk River to Ottawa stops with its rear outside the station and no one goes back to protect it. As the signal is cleared for the train to leave, the engineer of the next train, a special troop train, mistakes it for his own signal and crashes into the first train. There are 36 people killed and 200 injured.

== 1943 ==
- January 4 – Germany – An express runs into the back of a stationary train between Hanover and Wunstorf, killing 20 people and seriously injuring another 20.
- January 22 – Canada – The locomotive engineer and the fireman of a Canadian Pacific Railway passenger train are killed at Tapley, Ontario when their engine leaves the tracks pulling the baggage car and a passenger coach with it. They are the only casualties. The passengers are shaken up but not seriously injured.
- April 29 – Canada – Seventeen passengers are slightly injured when a Canadian Pacific Railway passenger train leaves the rails approximately 11 km (seven miles) west of Chapleau, Ontario. The suspected cause is a broken rail.
- June 3 – British India – Near Akola on the Great Indian Peninsula Railway, a mail train from Bombay to Calcutta (now Mumbai and Kolkata) collides at full speed with a goods train; 50 are killed and 100 injured.
- June 4 – New Zealand – Hyde railway disaster: Train derails taking a curved cutting at over twice the rated speed. 21 killed, 47 injured. Engineman found to have been drunk on duty; served 3 years for manslaughter.
- July 6 – Turkey – In Istanbul, the funicular cable on the Tünel snaps. One train is braked to a stop, but the other train runs away and one car smashes out of the lower station and into the street; at least one person is killed and 20 are taken to hospital. Some accounts indicate as many as 18 dead and 44 injured, with both trains running away.
- August 30 – United States – The Lackawanna Limited wreck: The Lackawanna Limited, flagship passenger train of the Delaware, Lackawanna and Western Railroad, sideswipes a local freight whose engineer had thought there was time to briefly pull out of a siding for shunting before the passenger train arrived. 28 killed, 110 injured.
- September 6 – United States – 1943 Frankford Junction train wreck: 79 people are killed and 117 injured when the Pennsylvania Railroad's Congressional Limited derails in Kensington, Philadelphia, Pennsylvania when a journal box on one of the cars overheats (hot box), ultimately causing an axle to snap. The accident occurred as the signalman at Frankford Junction was telephoning the next tower to stop the train.
- September 7 – United States – The locomotive boiler on an Erie Railroad passenger train explodes at Port Jervis, New York. As nobody was killed, not even the engine crew, this might not be considered notable except that it happened 30 minutes before a similar, and fatal, accident in the same state.
- September 7 – United States – The boiler on New York Central Railroad's NYC Hudson locomotive No. 5450 explodes as the train runs through Canastota, New York while hauling the 20th Century Limited from Chicago to New York. Of the train's 17 cars carrying 173 passengers, 10 cars derail, but only the three enginemen are killed, thanks in part to a trainman who runs forward to flag down an oncoming freight before it collides with the wreckage.
- October 6 – German-occupied France – Chalon-sur-Saône: An express for Lyon crashes into a derailed freight train, killing 21 people and injuring about 90.
- October 26 – Japan – Multiple errors involving three trains resulted in a significant number of casualties. A freight train arrived at Tsuchiura Station, Ibaraki Prefecture, around 18:40 and was lifting 41 cars onto the track for a changeover. A signaller made a wrong switch on the branch line, causing the first accident where a branching car from the main line went off the rails. At 18:51:30, a second freight train, running according to the in-station signals, collided with the first freight train, causing fourteen train cars to derail and roll over. At 18:54, a local train running from Ueno Station to Taira Station, then collided with the freight trains that were now blocking the main track. Estimates of the death toll range from 92 to more than 110, with more than 100 injured.
- October 29 – Canada – The westbound Canadian Pacific Railway transcontinental passenger train has four cars derail approximately 64 km (40 miles) east of Chapleau, Ontario. The injuries to passengers and train crew are slight.
- November 14 – British India – The Indo-Ceylon Boat Mail derails at 3:30 am at Serndhanur, between Cuddalore Junction and Viluppuram, killing 39 people and injuring 88.
- December 16 – United States – Rennert railroad accident: 74 people are killed on the Atlantic Coast Line Railroad when the northbound Tamiami Champion hits the derailed rear three carriages of the southbound Tamiami Champion.
- Date unknown - Netherlands - a passenger train is derailed at Den Haag Laan van NOI station due to a broken rail. One passenger is killed and nineteen are injured.

== 1944 ==
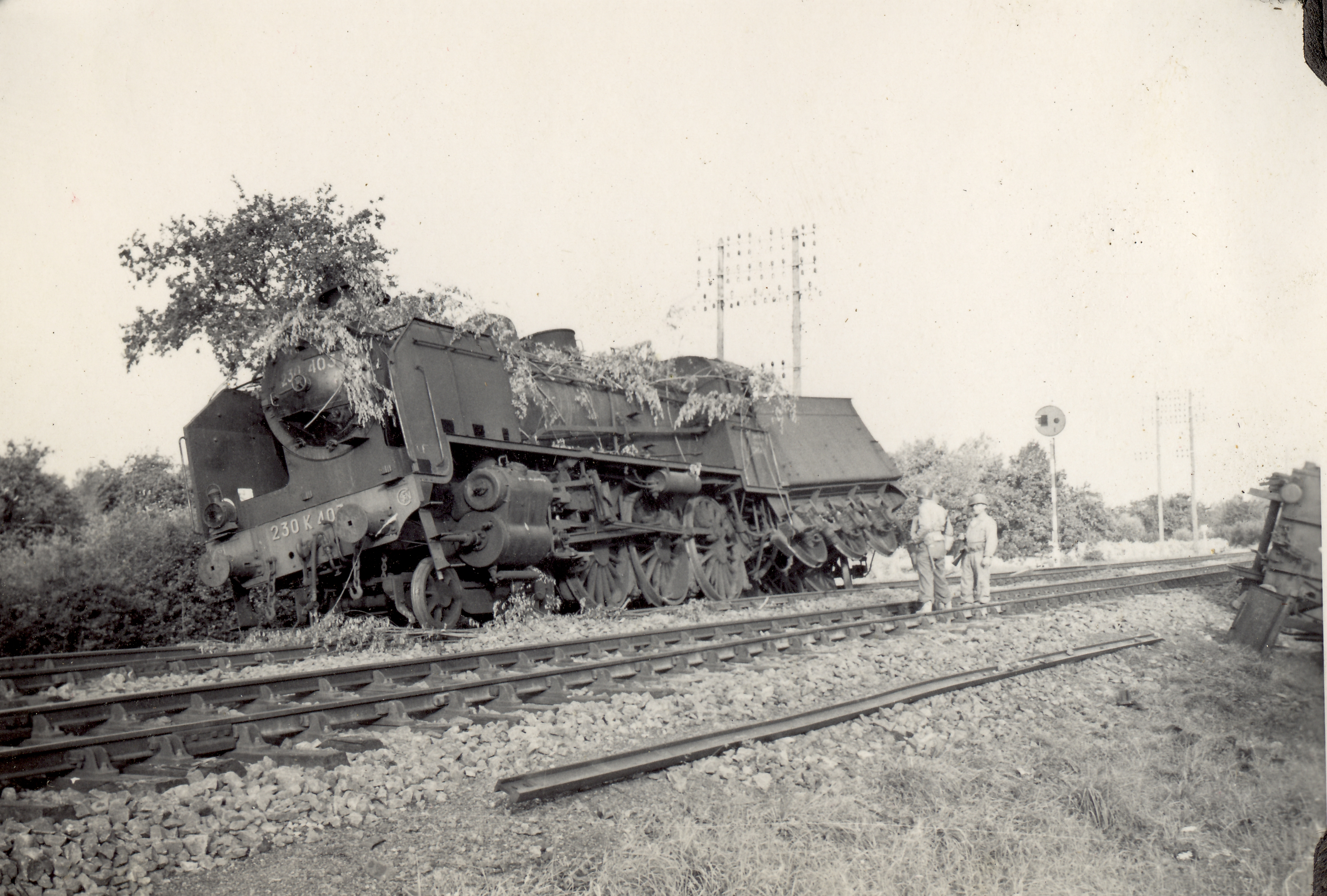
Train wreck near St. Malo France August 1944.

- January 3 – Spain – Torre del Bierzo rail disaster: Near Torre del Bierzo on the line between León and A Coruña, a passenger and mail train runs away following a brake failure and collides in a tunnel with short train being shunted; this destroys the signal cables so that an oncoming coal train cannot be warned and it collides with the wreckage, which burns. Estimates of the death toll range from the official 78 to probably exaggerated figures of over 500.
- January 11 – Spain – An accident near Arévalo kills 37 people.
- January 16 – United Kingdom – Ilford rail crash: An express passenger train from Norwich to London Liverpool Street station passes a signal set at danger, and runs into the back of an express passenger train from Yarmouth. 9 killed.
- January 20 – Germany – At Porta Westfalica station, in the Weser gorge on the line between Hanover and Osnabrück, an express crashes into a stationary train; 53 are killed and 62 injured.
- February 4 – United Kingdom – Catterick Bridge explosion, In North Yorkshire, England, a train carrying explosives exploded on Catterick Bridge station. The cause was incorrect loading of explosives on the train cars. 12 people were killed and 100 people were injured.
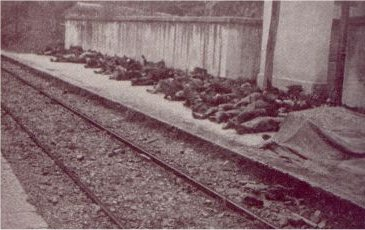
- Balvano train disaster
  March 3 – Italy – Balvano train disaster: 530 people riding a freight train die of carbon monoxide poisoning when the locomotive stalls in a tunnel. It is still Italy's deadliest railway disaster.
- June 2 – United Kingdom – Soham rail disaster: While approaching Soham station, the leading wagon of a 51-wagon train carrying American ammunition to a base in Ipswich catches fire; the burning wagon is decoupled from the rest of the train, but before the train can clear the station platform, the bombs loaded in the wagon explode, killing the driver and a signalman and nearly destroying the station.
- July 6 – United States – At High Cliff, 3 miles (4.8 km) east of Jellico, Tennessee, a troop train carrying new recruits on the Louisville and Nashville Railroad, traverses a series of reverse curves at 45 mph (72 km/h) when the speed limit is 35 mph (56 km/h) and the track is somewhat defective. The locomotive and 4 leading cars derail and fall 50 feet (15 m) into a small river called the Clear Fork; 35 people are killed and about 100 or more injured.
- July 20 – United Kingdom – A London and North Eastern Railway passenger train is derailed by faulty points at Pannal, Yorkshire.
- August 4 – United States – Stockton train wreck: The last five cars of a 14-car Atlantic Coast Line Railroad train derail at Stockton, Georgia due to a broken rail; 47 killed, mostly black workers returning home to Alabama for the weekend.
- September 3 – Japan – Gokurakubashi (Mount Koya) bound train was traveling on a gradient of the Nankai Koya Line, has a sudden stop and fire broke out from under the floor in Wakayama Prefecture. 71 people were killed and 138 were injured.
- September 14 – United States – On the Chicago and Eastern Illinois Railroad, a northbound express/passenger train fails to take a siding at Dewey, Indiana and collides head-on with the first section of the southbound Dixie Flyer at Terre Haute, Indiana. 29 people died and 42 were injured, many of whom were airmen on leave after being wounded overseas.
- September 18–20 – United States – A Great Northern Railway (GN) freight train collides with a Northern Pacific Railway (NP) freight near Castle Rock, Washington, on the NP. The wreckage blocks the eastbound track, so eastbound trains must use the westbound track without the protection of automatic signals. While doing this the next day, the crew of an eastbound GN special passenger train throws out a fusee to protect the train, but it burns out and the following eastbound train, another GN special with presidential candidate Thomas E. Dewey aboard, crashes into the first train. The following day the NP suffers another accident when a dispatcher's error causes two freights to collide at a closing speed of 60 mph (100 km/h) on the Hoquiam branch. Altogether 4 people are killed and 69 injured in the three crashes.
- November 2 – Romania – A military train and goods train collide at Craiova, killing 60 and injuring 100.
- November 7 – Puerto Rico – Passenger train derails in Aguadilla, due to excessive speed on a descent. 16 killed; 50 injured.
- November 8 – United States – Nine killed and 125 injured when, at dawn, the first section of the westbound Southern Pacific Challenger jumps the tracks and hurtles into a ditch three miles (5 km) west of Colfax.
- November 14 – United States – Newport, Pennsylvania – Two Pennsylvania Railroad freights collide head-on at about 2200 hours ET on a track normally reserved for westbound traffic. About five minutes later, a westbound special troop train, headed from New York to Chicago, strikes the wreck. Injuries included the engineer and fireman of the westbound freight, and two porters and an enlisted man on the passenger special.
- November 24 – Poland – Collision of two trains (German supply train and Polish passenger train) in Barwałd Średni, occupied Poland. 130 people killed and over 100 wounded.
- December 23 – Indonesia – A passenger train derailed into the valley around Lembah Anai in Padang Panjang. A total of 200 people were killed and 250 were seriously injured. The accident is the worst train accident in Indonesia.
- December 27 – Slovakia – Stará Kremnička derailment, A train carrying German troops to the front derails near Stará Kremnička because of defective brakes. Derailment at high speed and subsequent fire and explosions of ammunition kill 370 passengers, with only 7 survivors, according to few available sources. A yearbook from a nearby train station notes more than 200 deaths.
- December 31 – United States – Bagley train wreck: Southern Pacific's Pacific Limited passenger train section, First 21, is forced to stop and then proceed slowly when a freight train ahead developed problems. Second 21, the train's mail section, is unaware of the problems ahead and continues at full speed and later slams into the back of First 21 near Ogden, Utah; 50 killed.

== 1945 ==
- January 10 – United Kingdom – Ballymacarrett rail crash: Collision in fog. 22 killed, 27 injured.
- January 11 – France – A collision at Rozières-sur-Mouzon, on the line between Nancy and Dijon, kills 23 people and injures 9.
- January 13 - Belgium - At the crossing on the Haachtstraat in the village of Velthem-Beyssem at ~02:00, a 3-ton lorry carrying around 20 ATS servicewomen back to base from a dance is hit by a fast-approaching train. The crossing had been closed as usual for the night but someone had evidently forcibly removed the padlock and chain in order to cross. The lorry is thrown against an adjacent signal box (displacing the latter by ~15cm) and set afire. Some 19 of the women are injured, 5 killed outright and one succumbs to her injuries later (ironically on 07.May, the last day of the war in Europe).
- January 18 – France – At the branch-line terminus of Saint-Valery-en-Caux, a 45-car train full of American troops runs away and crashes through the buffer stop. One source says 84 people are killed and 226 injured; another says 89 killed and 152 injured.
- February 1 – Mexico – At El Cazadero in Querétaro, two passenger trains both going to the festival at San Juan de los Lagos collide and three of the cars catch fire; 127 are killed.
- February 4 – United Kingdom – King's Cross railway accident: A train for Leeds departs from platform 5 into the uphill Gasworks Tunnel, but begins sliding backwards on slippery rails, and with few lights in the tunnel, the driver does not notice. With the points changed behind the train, it is now moving toward the occupied platform 10. A signalman's attempt to divert it is a few seconds too late and derails the rear car (now leading) instead. It collides with a signal gantry, killing 2 passengers, and with the train in platform 10.
- March 6 – Canada – A Westbound Canadian Pacific Railway passenger train encounters a broken rail and all nine passenger cars derail at Zorra, Ontario. The first two cars of this train turn over while the remaining seven remained upright.
- March 22 – British India – In what is now Pakistan, a passenger train from Karachi to Rohri is rear-ended at Jungshahi by a goods train; 24 people killed and 43 injured.
- March 23 – Indonesia – Hundreds of passengers died after a railroad bridge broke, causing a passenger train to crash and slide into the Anai Valley in Tanah Datar.
- May 21 – United States – Piqua, Ohio: a seventeen-car westbound troop train, travelling on the Pennsylvania Railroad line, derails at high speed. Eight cars plunge down a 20-foot (6.1 m) embankment, injuring 24 of the 400 soldiers on board; poor track maintenance due to wartime personnel shortages is blamed.
- June 13 – Italy – At Baschi, near Orvieto on the line from Florence to Rome, the driver of a freight train including 15 tank cars of gasoline misinterprets a hand signal and proceeds, colliding head-on with a passenger train with many Italian and some British soldiers aboard. The resulting fire is so devastating that the number of dead can only be estimated, at about 70; 100 people are taken to hospital with injuries.
- June 15 – United States – Near Milton, Pennsylvania: The Buffalo-bound Pennsylvania Railroad Dominion Express derails, killing some 18 aboard. Wreck crews recover the bodies of 14 passengers and two crew five hours after the accident, which also injures at least 27 others seriously enough for hospitalization.
- July 13 – Germany – Weingarten: Wreck of train carrying soldiers of 65th Infantry Regiment/20th Infantry Division due to sabotage by German officer August Lindenmeyer (arrested). U.S. loses 6 killed.
- July 16 – Germany – Aßling: A US Army train carrying tanks runs into a passenger train which had stalled due to an engine breakdown after the American signalman tells the freight train to proceed despite the track still being occupied. About 110 German POWs are killed as the mostly wooden coaches of the passenger train are destroyed.
- July 21 – United Kingdom – A London Midland and Scottish Railway express passenger train overruns signals and collides with a freight train that is shunting at Ecclefechan, Dumfriesshire. Two people are killed and 31 are injured.
- July 27 – France – At Saint-Fons, near Lyon, a passenger train and a munitions train collide, igniting not only the wreckage but also the local gas works. Different sources say 4 people are killed and 27 injured, or "numerous passengers" killed, or about 150 people killed.
- August 9 – United States – Michigan train wreck: The first section of the Great Northern's Empire Builder is stopped by a hot box at Michigan City, North Dakota. The crew does not protect the rear, and the second section plows into it; 34 are killed and about 50 injured.
- August 13 – British-occupied zone of Germany – Two trains carrying soldiers on leave collide head-on at Goch on the single-track branch from Krefeld, reopened only a week before; 21 people are killed.
- September 2 – United Kingdom – Haywards Heath, West Sussex, England. A Streatham-to-Newhaven empty coaching stock train, failed to stop after being signalled into a siding. It ran through the buffer stops and into the buttress of Haywards Heath Tunnel, killing the driver and fireman. It had been diverted into the siding, in order to reverse onto the up line, as the down line had been taken out of service by an engineering possession.
- September 4 – France – Due to a signalman's error, a military mixed train consisting of 8 passenger cars followed by 4 empty freight wagons, and 19 tank cars of gasoline is diverted into a siding at Kédange-sur-Canner where it crashes into a stationary freight train. The resulting fire spreads to the passenger cars; 39 people are killed and 34 injured.
- September 4 – United States – The second section of the EB double-headed AT&SF California Limited derails at Arcadia, California, roughly one mile (1600 m) from the Santa Anita racetrack, killing the engineer, four passengers, and injuring 115 others. Company officials place blame on the engineer for excessive speed but an investigation by Los Angeles county authorities suggests that a broken rail may have been responsible.
- September 6 − Japan − According to former Japan Railroad Ministry official confirmed report, a local train derailment and crush into safety guard, when a train driver asleep condition and regressing at a switchback type Sasago station, Chuo Line, Yamanashi Prefecture, 60 persons were human fatalities and 90 persons were hurt.
- September 7 – United Kingdom – The bank of the Shropshire Union Canal fails near Sun Bank Halt, Denbighshire and causes the trackbed of the Ruabon–Barmouth line to be washed away for 40 yards (37 m). A Great Western Railway mail and freight train is derailed, with all vehicles except a brake van destroyed in the ensuing fire. One person is killed and two are injured.
- September 9 – Argentina – A passenger train derails in Iturbe, Jujuy, killing 36 and injuring more than 50.
- September 12 – United States – The Pennsylvania Railroad's Washington-to-Detroit Red Arrow strikes a stalled automobile at Tiro, Ohio, derailing the locomotive and seven cars. At least 14 are injured.
- September 21 – France – On the Vernaison bridge, located not in Vernaison but over the Isère at Romans-sur-Isère, with one track still out of service due to wartime damage, a mixed train is signaled onto the single remaining track and collides head-on with a Micheline en route from Grenoble to Valence, and there is a fire; 30 people are killed and 106 injured.
- September 29 – United States – The fireman on the AT&SF California Limited receives steam burn injuries when the locomotive and two baggage cars pile up against a freight locomotive and two or three cars which derail at Turner, Missouri, before the express can be flagged.
- September 30 – United Kingdom – Bourne End rail crash: Train fails to slow down for temporary diversion to slow lines and derails, 43 killed.
- November 15 – Spain – A mail and a freight train collide at Fuensanta, near Huércal-Overa in Almería province, killing 20 people.
- November 16 – United States – A westbound freight train near Lydick, Indiana failed to fully retract its water scoop before the end of the track pan resulting in a derailment. The eastbound Advance Commodore Vanderbilt collided with the derailed freight train before flag protection could be established.

== 1946 ==
- January 1 – United Kingdom – Lichfield rail crash: Due to frozen points, a goods train is routed onto the platform loop at Lichfield Trent Valley and rear-ends a stationary passenger train; 20 killed.
- January 5 – United Kingdom – Browney rail crash, a London and North Eastern Railway freight train becomes divided south of Durham. The train is stopped at Browney but the second part of the train crashes into it. The wreckage causes a false clear signal to be given, and an express passenger train travelling in the opposite direction crashes into it. Ten people are killed and eight are seriously injured.
- February 10 – United Kingdom – A combination of driver's and signalman's errors results in London and North Eastern Railway passenger train being derailed at Potters Bar, Hertfordshire. An express passenger train crashes into it, followed by another minutes later. Two people are killed.
- March 4 – British India – A freight train collides head-on with the Dehra Dun Express at Baghauli; 60 people are killed, including both drivers, and 48 injured, most of the casualties being in a third-class car.
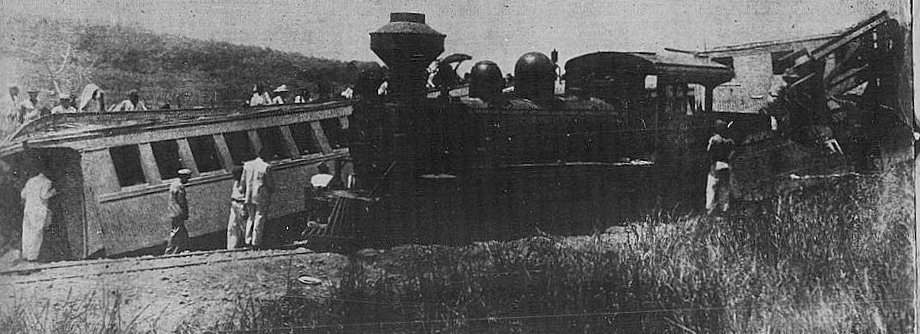
- Aracaju train crash
  March 20 – Brazil – Aracaju train crash, 185 are killed and 300 injured in Brazil's worst ever train crash when a train derails descending a steep gradient near Aracaju, capital of Sergipe state.
- April 25 – United States – Naperville train disaster: Chicago, Burlington and Quincy Railroad's Advance Flyer, stopped in Naperville station to check the running gear, is rammed by the Burlington's Exposition Flyer, coming through on the same track at 80 mph (130 km/h). 47 killed, some 125 injured.
- July 17 – United Kingdom – Two passenger trains collide at Victoria Station, London. Seven people were hospitalised.
- July 27 – United Kingdom – At Edgware tube station, London, the driver of a train on London Underground's Northern line has a sudden heart attack, and the train crashes into the buffers. The train driver dies later of heart failure.
- July 28 – British India – At Bhatni Junction on the Oudh and Tirhut Railway, a train to Katihar is struck in the rear by one going to Allahabad, killing 223 people.
- August 3 – United States – in Wayne County, New York, four men from Clyde were killed when westbound New York Central passenger train, estimated by some workers to be traveling over 70 mph (112 km/h) bore down on the men as they were trying to remove a bolting machine on a curve on track 1. A freight train was passing them on track 2 at the time of the fatality which was set as 1:25 EST. All victims were veterans with the railroad.
- August 21 – United States – near Sweetwater County, Wyoming: The Mail Express Number 6 was eastbound at the time of the accident and had passed through Rock Springs at 2:07 a.m. The train was due to arrive in Rawlins at 2:55 a.m. but had derailed about 2:20 a.m. The train derailment occurred about a mile (1600 m) west of the Thayer junction. References: The Rawlins Daily Times, Rawlins, Wyoming, Wednesday, August 21, 1946, Volume LVIII, Number 162, pages 1 and back page and Thursday, August 22, 1946, Volume LVIII, Number 163, pages 1 and 6. Early reports the wreck had been caused by a broken rail or an open switch were not confirmed by Union Pacific. Cause of the derailment was undetermined. Seven men injured and one died. The deceased was the engineer, David Francis Michie, who died of severe burns he suffered in the derailment.
- September 20 – United Kingdom – near Catford, southeast London: A London Victoria-to-Ramsgate passenger train derails on a curve at 40 mph (64 km/h). Seven of the nine carriages leave the track, with the first four dropping to the bottom of the 20-foot (6.1 m) embankment. One passenger from the first carriage is killed. Derailment was due to poor track.
- September 23 – British India – On the Oudh and Tirhut Railway, the Lucknow Express is derailed between Dighwara and Barra Gopal, killing 27 and injuring 70.
- September 26 – United States – Near Victorville, California, a Union Pacific train, the "Transcon Limited", carrying U.S. military personnel returning from World War II service, derailed and crashed killing seven and injuring another 75.
- September 28 – Poland – At 5:40 an express train running from Wrocław hits a wrongly placed passenger train standing at Łódź Kaliska station. Number of casualties varies between 21 or 23. 42 to 150 people were injured.
- October 4 – British India – At Ongole on the Madras and Southern Mahratta Railway, a goods train collides with the Madras-to-Calcutta (now Chennai and Kolkata) mail, killing 36 and injuring 81.
- November 12 – France – A freight train runs past two danger signals and collides with a stationary local passenger train at Revigny-sur-Ornain, killing 31 people, almost half of them schoolchildren.
- December 13 – United States – near Coulter, Ohio: The Pennsylvania Railroad's Golden Triangle sleeper train derails in darkness when it strikes the wreckage of 2 freight trains which had rear-ended half an hour earlier on an adjacent track. 19 killed, 139 injured. Most of the dead are soldiers on furlough from Fort Dix, New Jersey, seated in two day coaches at the front of the train.
- 1946 – United States – MP 85.5 (Winona), Columbus and Greenville Railway locomotive #506 a 2-8-2 built as Fort Smith & Western #25, a converted Camelback locomotive, picked a switch and struck a line of tank cars waiting in a siding; killing the engineer of the train and severely injuring the fireman. The exact cause is unknown, but believed to have been caused by a previous crew not closing a switch fully.

== 1947 ==
- January 2 – United Kingdom – A London and North Eastern Railway express passenger train overruns signals and crashes into the rear of another at Gidea Park, Essex. Two people are killed and 45 are hospitalised.
- January 11 – United States – a passenger train on the Southern Railway (U.S.) derailed at Burke, Virginia in Fairfax County, Virginia resulting in the death of 1 bystander and the injury of 38 passengers and 8 dining-car employees
- January 21 – United Kingdom – a Southern Railway electric multiple unit is run into by an empty passenger train at South Bermondsey, London.
- February 18 – United States – The Wreck of the Red Arrow – Blair County, Pennsylvania The Pennsylvania Railroad's "Red Arrow" from Pittsburgh to New York derailed at Bennington Curve west of Horseshoe Curve at 3:22 am local time. The train was going at excessive speed. Two of the PRR K4s engines slid down the mountain, along with several coaches. Of the 155 passengers on board, 24 died and 104 were injured (including crew). Ten of 15 cars derailed.
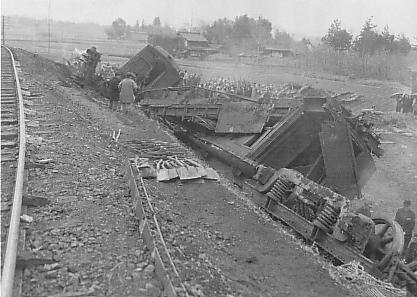
- Hachikō Line derailment
  February 25 – Japan – Hachikō Line derailment: A Japanese Government Railways passenger train derails on a sharp curve on the Hachikō Line between Komagawa and Higashi-Hannō stations due to excessive speed, causing four cars to roll off the track and into a field, killing 184 and injuring 495 in the worst rail accident in Japan.
- April 3 – United States – Downers Grove train wreck: The Twin Cities Zephyr, traveling at about 70 miles per hour (110 km/h) through the Downers Grove depot, strikes a heavy caterpillar tractor which had fallen from a freight train only seconds earlier. At least 3 die and more than 30 are injured.
- April 9 – United States – Raton, New Mexico – Eastbound Atchison, Topeka and Santa Fe Train No. 18, Super Chief, derails southwest of Raton, New Mexico, with two cars near the middle of the 13-car consist overturning. At least 26 suffer injuries. The three-unit diesel power set breaks away from the cars with the lead unit's nose coming to rest on a trestle over a dry river bed, and one diesel overturns. Only the last two cars remain on the rails, with the others jackknifed across the roadbed. Railroad officials say that there were 149 aboard the train.
- April 12 – United Kingdom – A passenger train is derailed near Keighley, Yorkshire when a bridge collapses under it due to storm damage.
- May 1 – United States – Huntingdon, Pennsylvania, USA: Two huge inch-thick (25.4 mm) steel plates on a Pennsylvania Railroad freight train strike and cut open the side of the first coach of the 15-car New York to St. Louis American, killing at least four passengers and injuring 40 others in a 1:47 a.m. EST accident five miles (8 km) west of the town. The steel plates are then jolted onto another track of the four-track mainline, derailing a third train, a freight.
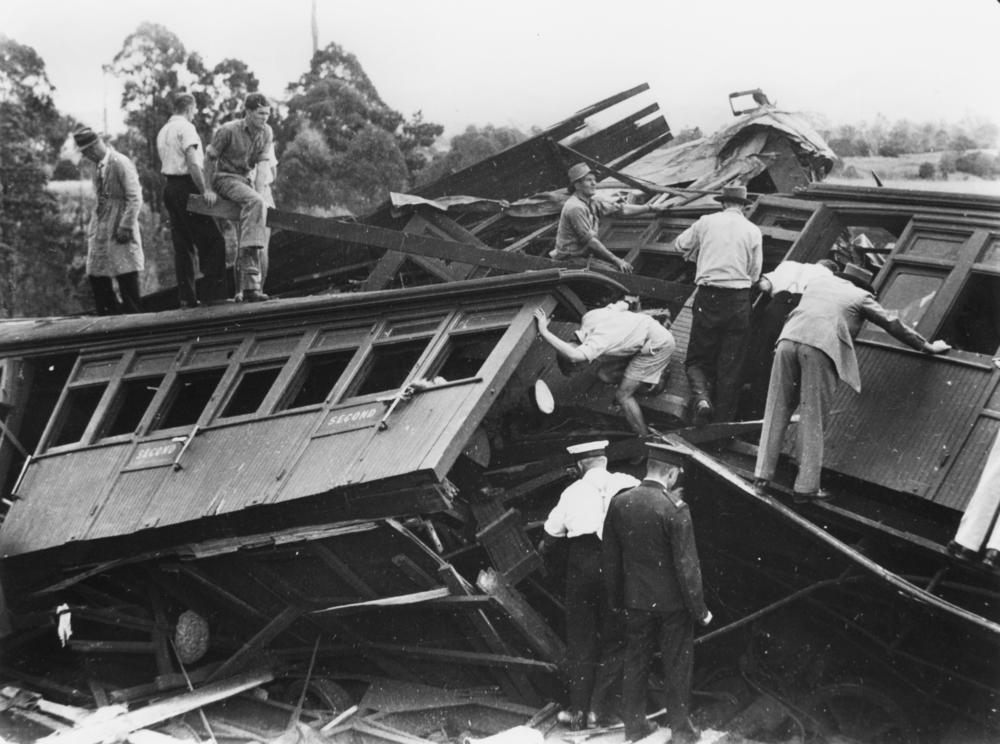
- Rescuers inspect the wreckage of the Camp Mountain train disaster.
  May 5 – Australia – Camp Mountain rail accident: A picnic train derails after taking a sharp curve too fast on the Dayboro line to the north-west of Brisbane. 16 killed.
- May 17 – British India – In what is now Bangladesh, on the metre-gauge Akhaura–Laksam–Chittagong line of the Bengal and Assam Railway, an express train derails between Kamalasagar and Nayanpur and cars roll down an embankment, killing 36 people and injuring 58.
- May 30 – United States – The engineer and fireman of the Frisco railroad's Kansas City-Florida Special are killed in a derailment near Mansfield, Missouri. Two passenger cars leave the rails but remain upright and none of the passengers sustain injury.
- June 3 – United States – Two crew members of a northbound train and one of a southbound train are killed when two Monon Railroad freight trains collide head-on twelve miles (19 km) north of Lafayette, Indiana after the southbound train fails to take the Ash Grove siding.
- June 15 – Argentina – A passenger train collides with a cow in La Cruz, Corrientes, killing 18 and injuring 48.
- July 21 – United Kingdom – An express passenger train is derailed at Grendon, Buckinghamshire due to defective track. Five people are killed and 64 are injured.
- July 23 – China – A passenger train en route from Shanghai to Tientsin (now Tianjin) hits a mine planted by Communist guerillas; 27 people are killed and 12 seriously injured.
- July 26 – Switzerland – Two trains collide between Biberbrugg and Einsiedeln. Ten people are killed and 73 are injured.
- August 9 – United Kingdom – 1947 Doncaster rail crash - A London and North Eastern Railway passenger train runs into the rear of another at Doncaster, Yorkshire due to a signalman's error. Twenty-one people are killed and 188 are injured.
- August 23 – Soviet-occupied zone of Germany – Train passengers bring on board a leaking can of gasoline and a package of nitrate film, and a cigarette starts a fire. The train is stopped at Velten, near Berlin, but as people hurry toward the only exit, a man stumbles, blocking the way. There are 24 people killed and 35 injured.
- September 1 – Canada – Dugald rail accident: A Canadian National Railway excursion train fails to take the siding and collides with the No. 4 Transcontinental that was standing on the main line. 31 people were killed, most by fire breaking out in two gas-lit wooden cars on the excursion train.
- September 24 – Pakistan – 1947 Kamoke train massacre, In Kamoke, Pakistan, a passenger refugee train was attacked by Muslim mob. The target was Sikh and Hindu passengers, 408 people were killed and 587 people were injured.
- October 24 – United Kingdom – South Croydon rail crash: Signalman improperly uses release key to free signals. Two commuter trains collide in thick fog, 32 killed.
- October 26 – United Kingdom – Goswick rail crash: Flying Scotsman express fails to slow for diversion and derails; 28 are killed.
- November 6 – United Kingdom – A collision occurs between two Southern Railway electric multiple units at Motspur Park, London due to a fog signalman's error. Four people are killed and twelve are injured.
- November 6 – United Kingdom – A Southern Railway passenger train overruns signals at Herne Hill, London and collides with an electric multiple unit. One person is killed and nine are injured.
- November 26 – United Kingdom – Near Farnborough, Hampshire, England. A Bournemouth West-to-London Waterloo train is halted near Farnborough due to the failure of signalling system's power supply. The following train, from Ilfracombe, is erroneously admitted into the section, and strikes the rear of the Bournemouth train at 20 mph (32 km/h), killing one passenger.
- December 3 – France – At Arras, striking railway workers remove 30 metres (100 ft) of rail, without disrupting the track circuit that might warn signalmen. A night mail train going from Paris to Tourcoing derails and 21 people are killed.
- December 22 – French-occupied zone of Germany – Two trains to Dortmund, one from Munich and one from Freiburg, collide at Neuwied; 42 are killed and 116 injured.
- 1947 – United States – MP 69.5 CAGY (Columbus & Greenville Railroad), Locomotive #506 derails after striking another train in the rear. Engine crew are killed, and the locomotive falls onto its side, becoming mired in the mud and embankment. Railroad tries to raise the engine, but upon being unable to do so, opt to simply scrap the locomotive in place, cutting it off even with the ground where it lies. #506 had previously been involved in another accident the year before, as well as a few minor derailments.

== 1948 ==
- January 23 – United Kingdom – A passenger train formed by a 6PUL and a 6PAN electric multiple unit overruns signals at London Bridge and collides with an empty stock train formed of two 6PAN units. Three people were killed and 34 injured,
- February 17 – France – Freight and passenger trains collide head-on at Thumeries on the line between Douai and Lille; at least 22 were killed and 30 injured.
- February 22 – Switzerland – Wädenswil, Lake Zurich: a Swiss South Eastern Railway train runs away down a steep incline and crashes into a house after being diverted into a siding to avoid a collision with other trains. Twenty-one people were killed. A separate switch determined whether the main control handle applied power or used the motors for braking, and the driver had failed to select braking and therefore inadvertently accelerated the train.
- March 21 – Italy – On a passenger train being assisted by a bank engine in the rear, a passenger operated the emergency signal near Spoleto. Two of the passenger cars crashed together hard enough to telescope, presumably because the bank engine had separated from the rear of the train and crashed into it when the train was braked. 4 people were killed and 60 injured.
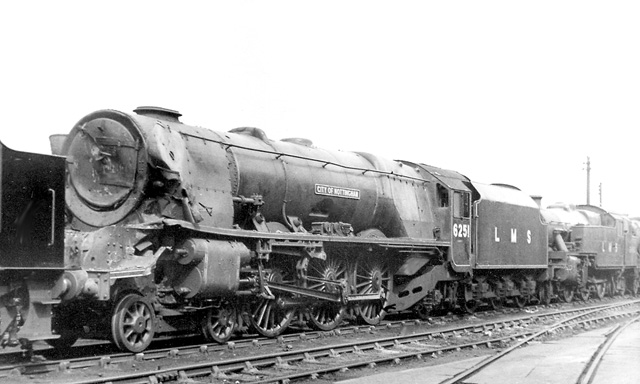
- 1948 Winsford railway accident
  April 17 – United Kingdom – Winsford rail accident (1948): Signalling error results in 24 deaths.
- May 12 – United States – A C. & O. engine suffered a boiler explosion due to a low water level near Chillicothe, Ohio. The train's engineer, fireman and front brakeman were killed.
- May 15 – India – The Dehra Dun Express from Howrah was derailed near Dhanbad, possibly by sabotage, while on an embankment 40 feet (12 m) high; 31 people were killed and 101 injured, 19 seriously.
- May 29 – Taiwan – While traveling over the Xindian River Bridge (now the Huacui Bridge) between Wanhua Station and Banqiao Station, the third-class train car of section 9 (car number 22034) of a Taiwan Railways train suddenly erupts in flames. Although the engineer stops the train, the fire ultimately spreads to three other cars. Passengers flee towards the front and rear of the train and others even jump into the Xindian River to escape the fire; 21 are confirmed dead with another 43 presumed when the four cars burn to the ground. A passenger had brought a flammable liquid on board and this ignited, starting the fire. Taiwan Railways Administration bans dangerous goods from trains, and implements a reward system for those who report violators.
- July 17 – United Kingdom – An express train and a local train collide at Ardler Junction, Scotland. Two people were killed and seven injured, one seriously. The local train overran signals, with a signalman's error in accepting the train when the express had been accepted being a contributory factor.
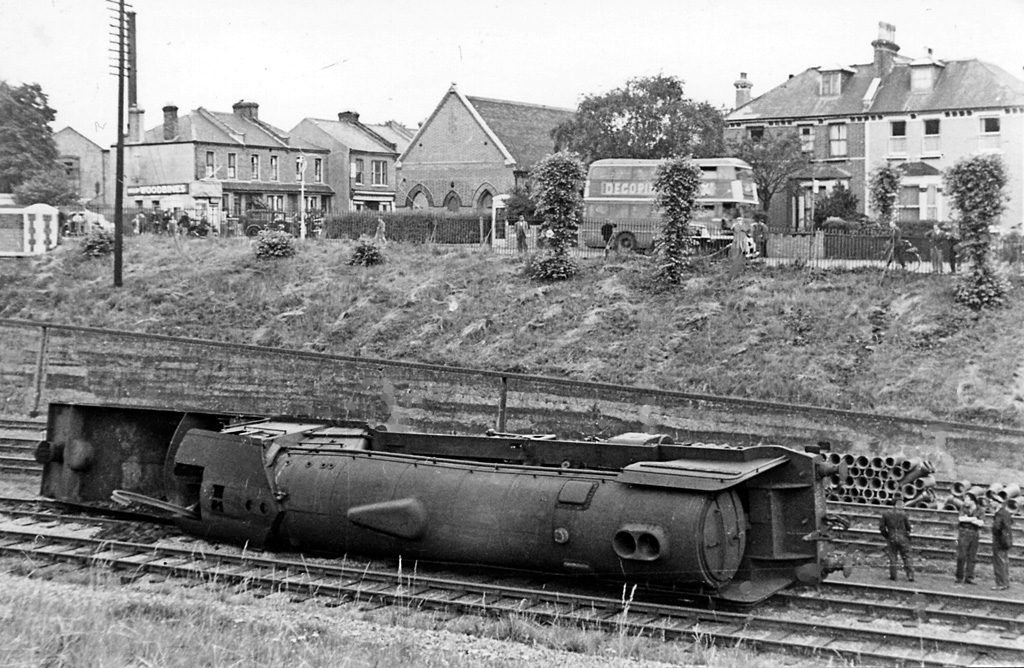
- New Southgate
  July 17 – United Kingdom – The locomotive of an express passenger train derails in Barnet Tunnel, Hertfordshire. On leaving the tunnel, the train derails on a crossover at New Southgate, Middlesex. One person was killed. A combination of faulty track and excessive speed was found to be the cause.
- July 29 – French-occupied zone of Germany – A tank car, loaded with Dimethyl ether and parked within the industrial complex of BASF at Ludwigshafen, leaks and explodes, releasing other chemicals. Over 200 people were killed and over 3,500 injured, most of them suffering from poisonous gases, and 300,000 m^{2} (74 acres) of the plant was destroyed.
- August 11 – United Kingdom – A London Transport electric multiple unit derails at Arnos Grove, Middlesex.
- September 14 – South Korea – About 15 miles (24 km) north of Taijon (now Daejeon), a passenger train crashes into the rear of another train; 40 people were killed and nearly 60 injured, most of them U.S. troops.
- October 28 – Turkey – A special train carrying Republican People's Party members to Ankara to celebrate Republic Day derails near the end of its trip; 100 are killed and 150 injured.
- November 23 – India – At Jullunder (now Jalandhar) Cantonment station on the Eastern Punjab Railway, a special train carrying refugees from the partition of India was backing into the station. Passengers were riding on the roof and the belongings of one of them fell on the track; the train derails, killing 21 people and injuring 106.
- November 24 – India – A train on the Eastern Punjab Railway, carrying refugees from Ambala Cantonment into Pakistan following the partition of India, travelled only 11 miles (18 km) to Shambhu before it crashes on a dead-end track; 171 people were killed and 300 injured.
- November 30 – United Kingdom – locomotive 4150 is running round its train at Lapworth when it collides with a passenger train hauled by 5022 Wigmore Castle, which had overrun signals. Eight passengers were injured.
- December 5 – British-occupied zone of Germany – A train from Hanover to Soltau collides with another train in dense fog; 7 were killed and 11 injured.

== 1949 ==
- January 11 – United States – Bay Lake, Florida - The Seaboard Coast Line Orange Blossom Special had an overheated bearing on a traction motor on the Diesel locomotive, which seized up and caused a derailment. There was one death and 76 injured.
- January 31 – United States – Rock, Michigan - Similar to the January 11 accident of the Orange Blossom Special, the Peninsula 400 also had an overheated bearing on a failed traction motor that caused a derailment. There was one death and 15 injured.
- February 13 – Spain – At Mons La Nueva in Catalonia, an express from Barcelona to Madrid derails and three cars go 130 feet (40 m) down an embankment into a dry river. 28 people are killed.
- February 18 – France – An express from Nancy to Dijon collides with a locomotive at Port d'Atelier, near Amance. Two wooden passenger cars are crushed between the steel cars in front of and behind them. Before dying of his injuries, the driver of the express manages to protect the wreck site by laying down detonators and notifying the crossing keeper. Altogether 43 people are killed.
- February 19 – United Kingdom – A freight train becomes divided at New Southgate, Middlesex. The rear portion runs away, but is not derailed at catch points due to a signalman's error. The wagons enter the main line and are run into by a parcels train.
- April 24 – United States – Smith County, Tennessee, Gordonsville, 10 persons were killed coming home from church at approximately 10:30 pm when a loaded locomotive hit them at a high speed. The family, in two trucks, was returning from church services. The driver, Jessie Bennett, aged 50, was blind in one eye. He was killed along with his wife, 45, and three of their sons, aged 12, 10, and 8. Also killed were the Bennett's daughter, 24, her husband, 24, their daughter, aged 1, the brother of the driver, aged 49, and a close family friend, 17.
- April 25 – United Kingdom – An express passenger train overruns signals and derails at Douglas Park Signal Box, Motherwell, Lanarkshire. Signalman suspected of moving the points under the train.
- April 28 – South Africa – In the suburbs of Johannesburg, on the line from Langlaagte to Midway station in Soweto, two successive electric trains are stopped for signals when a third one crashes into the second and pushes it forward to hit the first. Altogether 70 people are killed and 166 injured.
- July 4 – France – A Strasbourg-to-Paris express train derails in Emberménil, killing at least six and injuring at least 29.
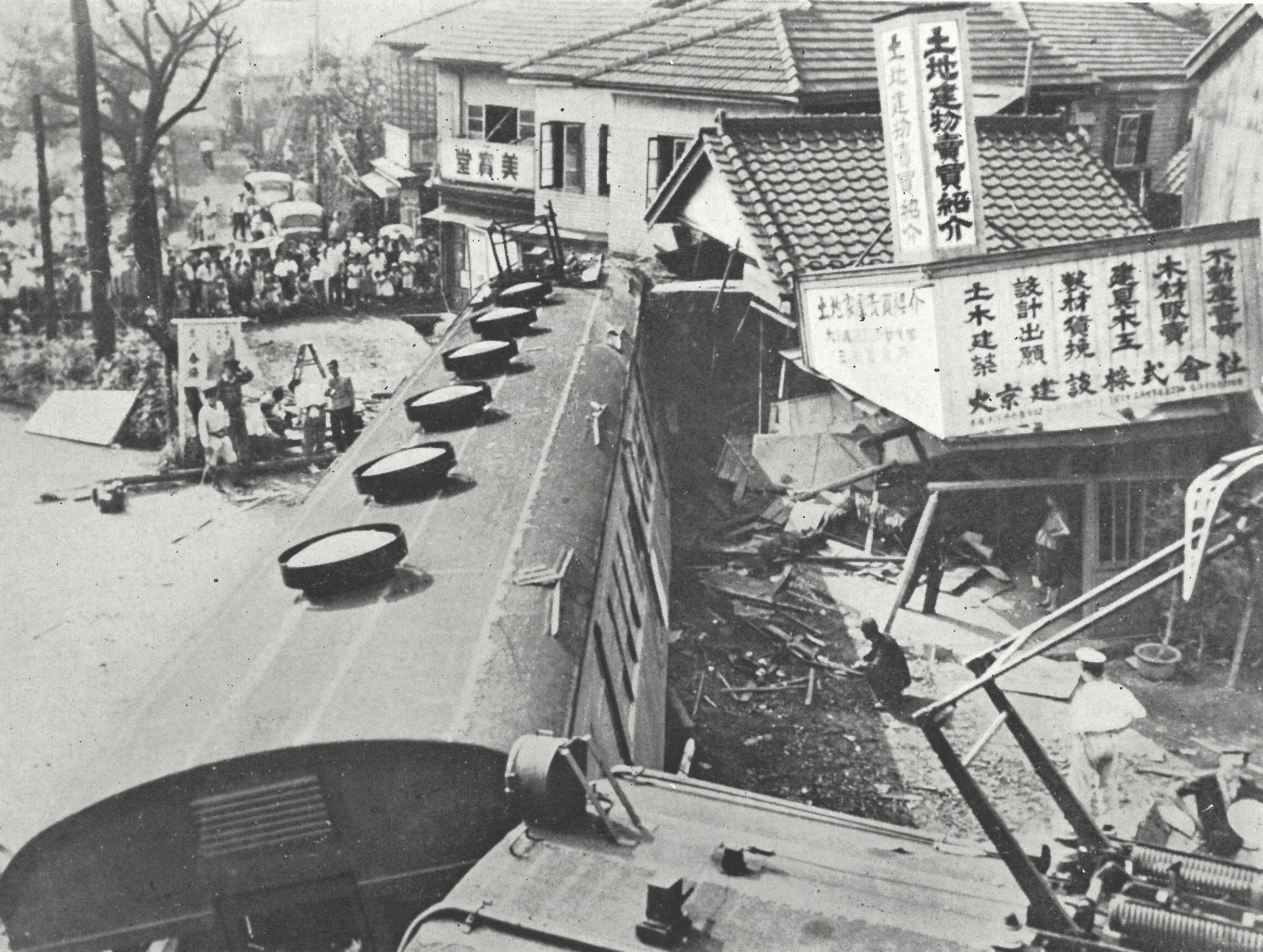
- Mitaka incident
  July 15 – Japan – Mitaka incident: An unmanned 63 series train with its operating handle tied down drives into Mitaka Station and derails, killing six and injuring 20.
- Matsukawa derailment
  August 17 – Japan – Matsukawa derailment: A Japanese National Railways passenger train derails and overturns on the Tōhoku Main Line between Kanayagawa and Matsukawa stations in Fukushima Prefecture due to sabotage, killing three crewmembers; all 412 passengers survive.
- October 11 – Argentina – A passenger train collides with a freight train in Palermo, Buenos Aires, killing 18 and injuring more than 80.
- October 22 – Poland – Nowy Dwór Mazowiecki train disaster: An express from Gdańsk to Warsaw derails on a curve at Nowy Dwór, overturning several cars; over 200 are killed (pl).
- November 16 – South Africa – At night, a train returning hundreds of migrant workers from Witwatersrand to Portuguese East Africa (now Mozambique) crosses a bridge in Waterval Boven, 70 metres (230 ft) above the Elands River. As it reaches the far end, both locomotives derail; at least 7 cars fall off the bridge and another 6 overturn. There are 64 deaths and 117 people injured.

== See also ==
- London Underground accidents

== Sources ==
- "Europe's history of rail disasters". BBC. October 11, 2006.
- "World's worst rail disasters". BBC. December 19, 2007.
- "GenDisasters Train Wrecks 1869–1943". Archived from the original on 2015-04-16.
- "Interstate Commerce Commission Investigations of Railroad Accidents 1911–1993". U.S. Department of Transportation. Archived from the original on 2004-10-12.
- Beebe, Lucius & Clegg, Charles (1952). Hear the train blow; a pictorial epic of America in the railroad age. New York: Grosset & Dunlap. ASIN B000I83FTC.
- Earnshaw, Alan (1989). Trains in Trouble: Vol. 5. Penryn: Atlantic Books. ISBN 0-906899-35-4.
- Earnshaw, Alan (1990). Trains in Trouble: Vol. 6. Penryn: Atlantic Books. ISBN 0-906899-37-0.
- Earnshaw, Alan (1991). Trains in Trouble: Vol. 7. Penryn: Atlantic Books. ISBN 0-906899-50-8.
- Earnshaw, Alan (1993). Trains in Trouble: Vol. 8. Penryn: Atlantic Books. ISBN 0-906899-52-4.
- Glover, John (2001). Southern Electric. Hersham: Ian Allan. ISBN 0-7110-2807-9.
- Gould, David (1990). Maunsell's SR Steam Carriage Stock. Headington, Oxford: The Oakwood Press. ISBN 978-0853614012.
- Griswold, Wesley S. (1969). Train Wreck!. Stephen Greene Press. ISBN 0-8289-0099-X.
- Haine, Edgar A. (1993). Railroad Wrecks. New York: Cornwall Books. ISBN 978-0-8453-4844-4.
- Hall, Stanley (1990). The Railway Detectives. London: Ian Allan. ISBN 0-7110-1929-0.
- Hoole, Ken (1982). Trains in Trouble: Vol. 3. Redruth: Atlantic Books. ISBN 0-906899-05-2.
- Hoole, Ken (1983). Trains in Trouble: Vol. 4. Truro: Atlantic Books. ISBN 0-906899-07-9.
- Karr, Ronald D. (1995). The Rail Lines of Southern New England – A Handbook of Railroad History. Branch Line Press. ISBN 978-0-942147-02-5.
- Kichenside, Geoffrey (1997). Great Train Disasters. Bristol: Siena Books. ISBN 0-75252-630-8.
- Leslie, Frank (1882-01-21). "Unknown". Illustrated Newspaper. Vol. LIII, no. 1, 374. New York. p. 1.
- Moody, G. T. (1979) [1957]. Southern Electric 1909–1979 (Fifth ed.). Shepperton: Ian Allan Ltd. ISBN 0-7110-0924-4.
- Reed, Robert C. (1968). Train Wrecks – A Pictorial History of Accidents on the Main Line. New York: Bonanza Books. ISBN 978-0-517-32897-2.
- Rolt, L. T. C.; Kichenside, G. M. (1982). Red for Danger: A history of railway accidents and railway safety (4th ed.). Newton Abbot, Devon: David & Charles. ISBN 0-7153-8362-0. OCLC 9526651.
- Semmens, Peter (1994). Railway Disasters of the World: Principal Passenger Train Accidents of the 20th Century. Patrick Stephens Ltd. ISBN 1-85260-323-2.
- Shaw, Robert B. (1978). A History of Railroad Accidents, Safety Precautions and Operating Practices. LCCN 78104064.
- Trevena, Arthur (1980). Trains in Trouble: Vol. 1. Redruth: Atlantic Books. ISBN 0-906899-01-X.
- Trevena, Arthur (1981). Trains in Trouble: Vol. 2. Redruth: Atlantic Books. ISBN 0-906899-03-6.
- Vaughan, Adrian (1989). Obstruction Danger. Wellingborough: Patrick Stephens Limited. ISBN 1-85260-055-1.
