= Kanayagawa, Fukushima =

Former village in Fukushima Prefecture, Japan

Kanayagawa (金谷川村, Kanayagawa-mura) was a village in Shinobu District, Fukushima Prefecture, Japan. It existed from 1 April 1889 until 20 March 1955, when it was merged into the town of Matsukawa. Its former area is now part of the city of Fukushima.

The boundary of Kanayagawa village as of 1 October 1950 (red) over present-day district boundaries (grey), with the Tōhoku Main Line

== History ==
Kanayagawa village was established on 1 April 1889, when the modern system of municipalities was introduced in Japan. On 20 March 1955 it was merged into the town of Matsukawa in Shinobu District, which was in turn merged into the city of Fukushima in June 1966.

The name of the village is kept by Kanayagawa Station on the Tōhoku Main Line. In April 2000, the campus of Fukushima University, until then part of Matsukawa-machi Asakawa, was given the new place name Kanayagawa, and the university's address became 1 Kanayagawa, Fukushima.

== Shrines and festivals ==
Kuronuma Shrine (黒沼神社) in Matsukawa-machi Kanazawa is the guardian shrine of the Kanazawa community. It is one of several shrines in Fukushima that are regarded as the "Kuronuma Shrine" of Shinobu District listed in the Engishiki register of shrines; a shrine register compiled in 1878 records the shrines at Mount Shinobu and at Kanazawa as shikinai (listed in the Engishiki).

Three festivals of the shrine are designated cultural properties:

- The Hayama-gomori of Kanazawa (金沢の羽山ごもり) was designated an Important Intangible Folk Cultural Property of Japan on 28 January 1980. It is held from the 16th to the 18th day of the eleventh month of the lunisolar calendar. Men of the community stay in a seclusion hut and purify themselves, and on the last day they climb Mount Hayama to receive an oracle from the mountain deity through a medium called noriwara. The written records of the oracles, 130 volumes, were designated an Important Tangible Folk Cultural Property of Fukushima Prefecture on 29 March 1985.
- The Jūni-kagura (twelve kagura dances) of Kuronuma Shrine was designated an Important Intangible Folk Cultural Property of Fukushima Prefecture on 28 March 1980.
- The Kenzen-sai (food-offering festival) of Kuronuma Shrine and its subsidiary Shinmei-gū, held on 3 and 4 May, was designated an Intangible Folk Cultural Property of the city of Fukushima on 13 September 2018.

== See also ==
- Matsukawa derailment
- Matsukawa Station
