= Canadian National 242 =

Canadian National 242 was a passenger train that operated on Canadian National's lines.

== Steam explosion ==
CN 242 suffered a serious explosion when on August 9, 1941, when it collided with a stationary engine at the Turcot Yard in Montreal Quebec. The yard lands were a brownfield that was re-habilitated for the Highway Interchange of Autoroute 40 and 20 in West Montreal.

According to a report by The Winnipeg Tribune, the passenger train, bringing commuters from Vaudreuil, was turned on to a side track by an open switch as it was passing through the rail yard. The passenger train then collided with the other engine, which was stationary on the side track. Lawrence Mahoney, the switchman, said the track switch had been opened five minutes before the passenger train was due to approach it. The indicator on the switch had shown that the passenger train was more than a mile away. The passenger train was moving at about 45–50 miles per hour when it reached the switch.

According to the Turcot yard-master, Patrick Donohue, visibility was poor on the morning of the accident due to a slight fog, smoke from other engines, and dust from a nearby construction job. He stated further, though, that he did "not think that conditions were such that the engineer or fireman of the passenger train would fail to see the danger signals on the indicators." Lawrence Mahoney, the switchman, said that "The automatic indicators along the main line bore danger signals clearly visible to the engineer of the passenger train."

Robert Maitland, the train fireman, 36, was seriously injured when the collision occurred, and had later died as of August 12, 1941. 27 people were taken to hospital, and 25 others received minor injuries in the collision.

"CNR passenger train #242 from Vaudreuil collides with a stationary switch engine in the Turcot Yards... the locomotive and two cars of the passenger train are derailed. The fireman is killed and the engineer is severely burned when the boiler ruptures... 53 passengers are injured."

== See also ==
- List of rail accidents (1930–49)
