= Stará Kremnička derailment =

1944 railway incident in Slovakia

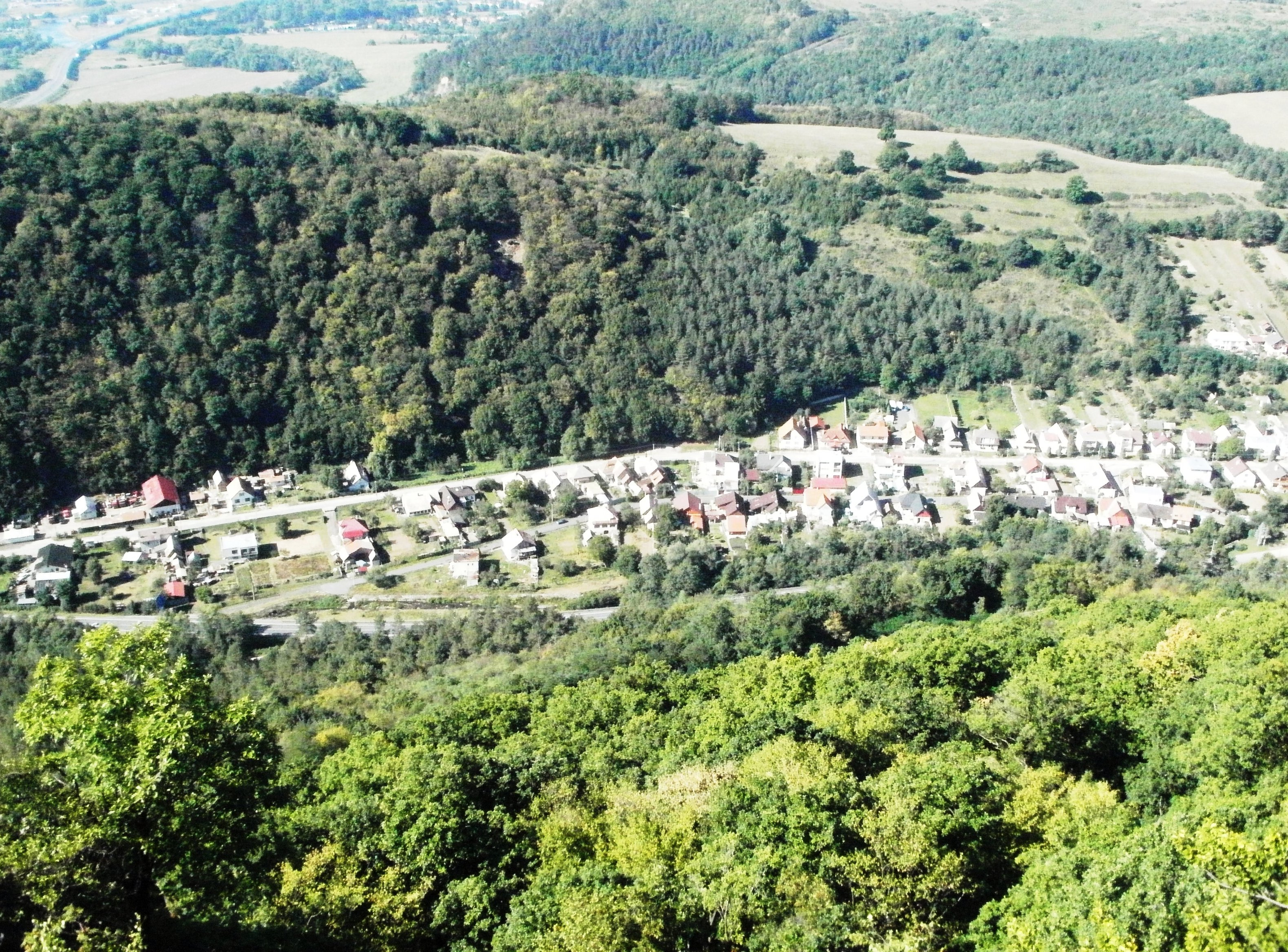
- The village of Stará Kremnička, where the accident occurred.

- Location within Slovakia

Details
- Date: 27 December 1944; 9 am
- Location: Stará Kremnička, Slovak Republic
- Coordinates: 48°36′06″N 18°53′18″E
- Country: Slovakia
- Incident type: Derailment
- Cause: Brake failure

Statistics
- Trains: 1
- Passengers: 375
- Crew: 2
- Deaths: 370
- Injured: 7

The Stará Kremnička derailment took place on 27 December 1944 in Stará Kremnička, Slovak Republic when a passenger train carrying German troops to the front lines derailed upon reaching the end of the train tracks after their brakes failed to operate properly, resulting in the deaths of 370 people with a further 7 injured.

== Accident ==
Passenger train number 10582, which was part of a German military transport, left for Vrútky just before midnight on 26 December 1944. The train consisted of 37 wagons which were filled with 375 German soldiers and officers, as well as ammunition and military equipment. The train crew consisted of two Slovaks, the train driver and his helper. In the early morning hours of 27 December, the train halted with great difficulty in Kremnica station. The Slovak train driver mentioned to the present German officers that the brakes didn't seem fully functional and asked permission to delay the scheduled departure to fix them. The Germans however, refused his offer due to the sensitive nature of the train's cargo and the possibility of sabotage from partisans. So the train departed again, and when it tried to brake during the trip to Bartošova Lehôtka station, the brakes failed to respond. The train driver wasn't able to fix the problem as the train sped at full speed through the station it was supposed to halt at. Knowing that a passenger train was inbound on the same track, the station master who saw the train speed past him, rerouted the train into a dead-end track, hoping the embankment at the end of the tracks could halt the runaway train.

At 9 am, the train reached the end of the tracks at Stará Kremnička and crashed into a reinforced concrete barrier, derailing the locomotive and 17 wagons. The wagons were catapulted over the 8 meter high elbankment and fell back onto the tracks near a tunnel entrance. The boiler of the locomotive was heavily damaged in the crash and ultimately burst into flames. As the flames spread, it ignited the stored ammunitions which exploded and engulfed the train in flames, trapping and burning many men in the wreckage. Out of the 377 people on board the train, only 7 survived with various injuries.

== Aftermath ==
The injured were taken to Stará Kremnička and the deceased were recovered and packed in sacks awaiting burial. The derailment became the deadliest train crash in Slovakia during World War II. Whether the disaster was an accident or caused by sabotage has never been fully investigated.
