= Fukushima University =

National university in Japan

- 福島大学
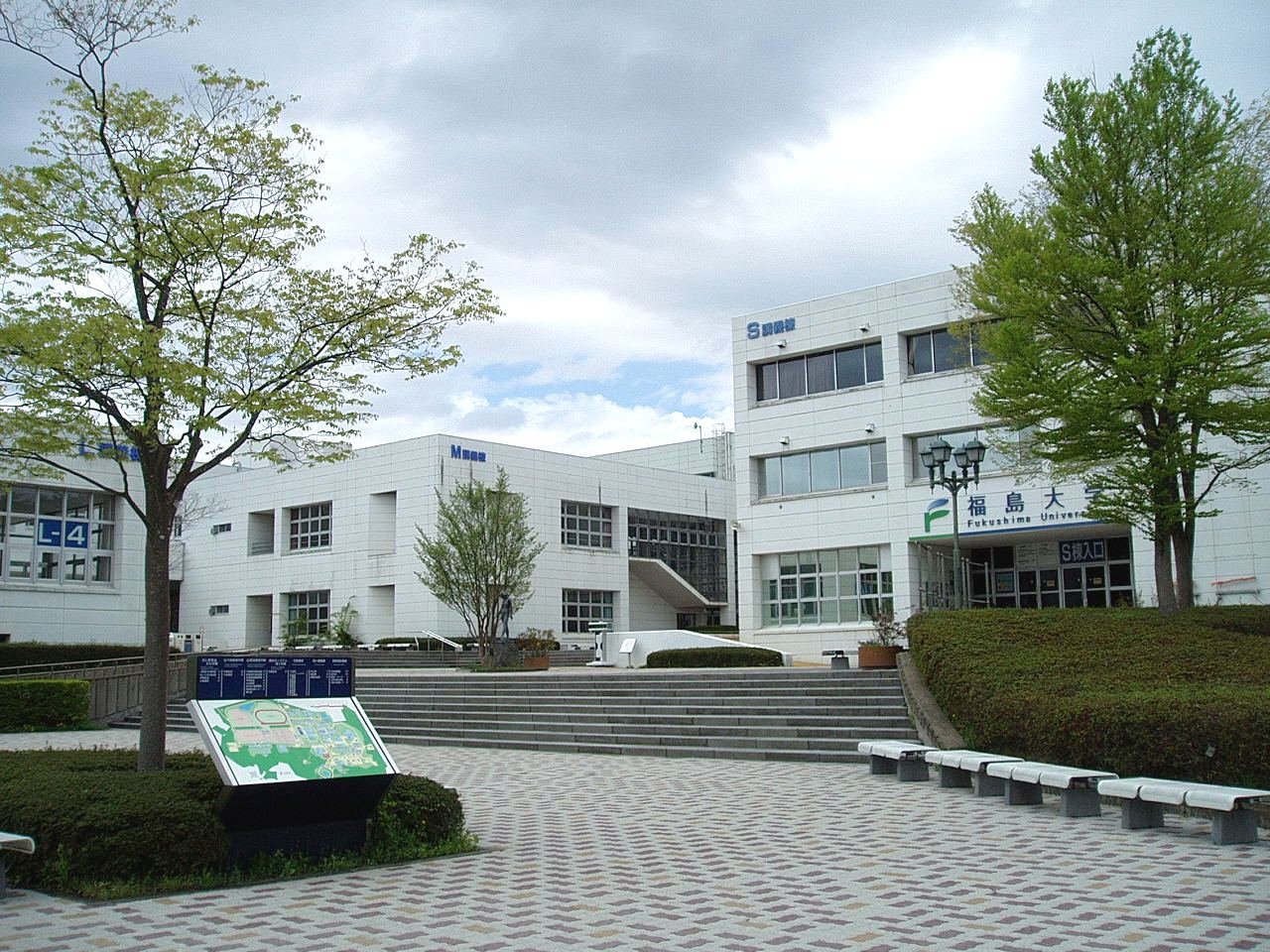
- Lecture halls at Fukushima University
- Type: National
- Established: 1949
- President: Katsumi Nakai
- Students: 4,493
- Undergraduates: 4,309
- Postgraduates: 184
- Location: Fukushima, Fukushima, Japan; 37°41′01″N 140°27′21″E
- Campus: Suburb
- Website: www.fukushima-u.ac.jp
- Japan Fukushima Prefecture

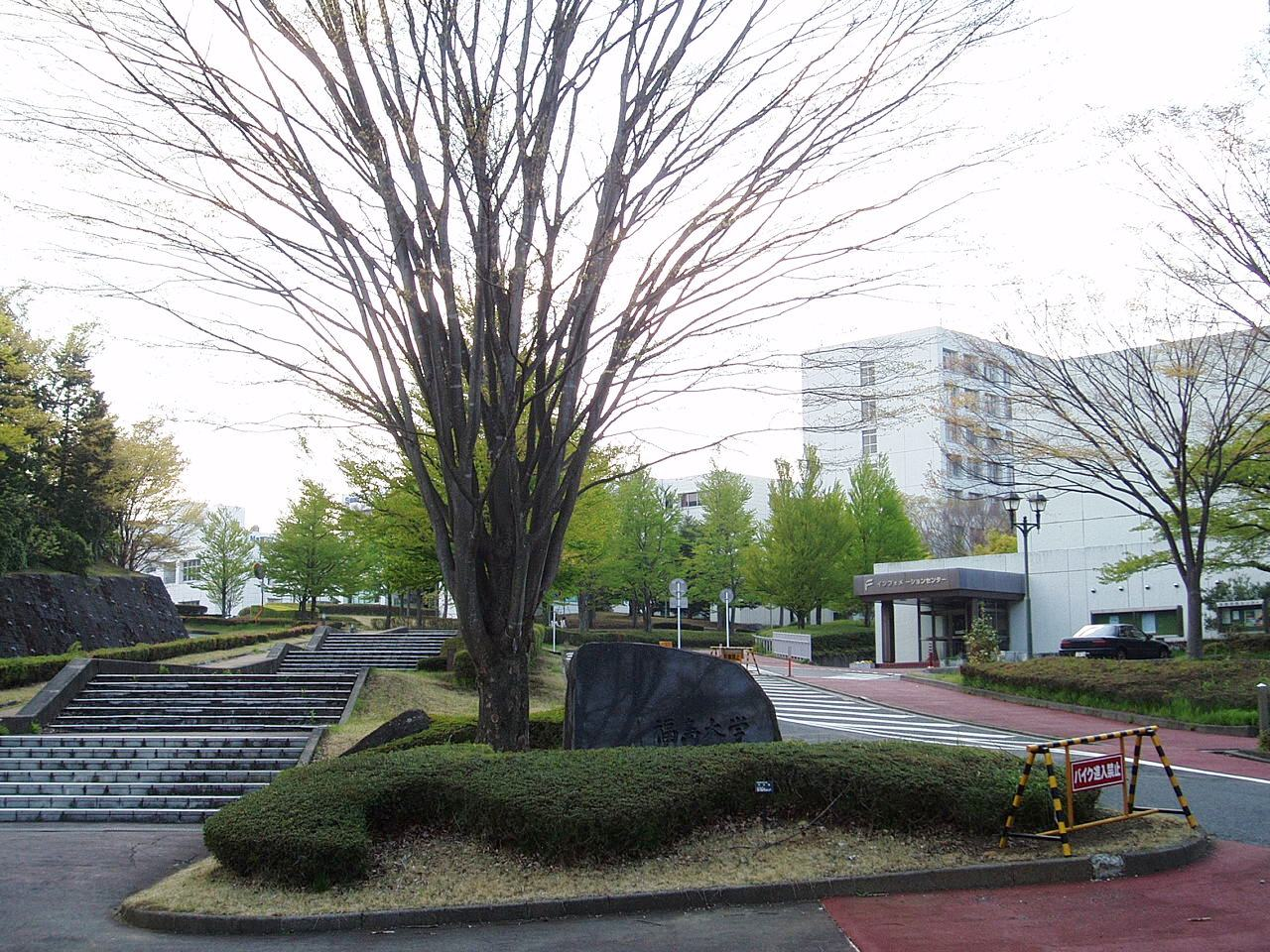
Main entrance

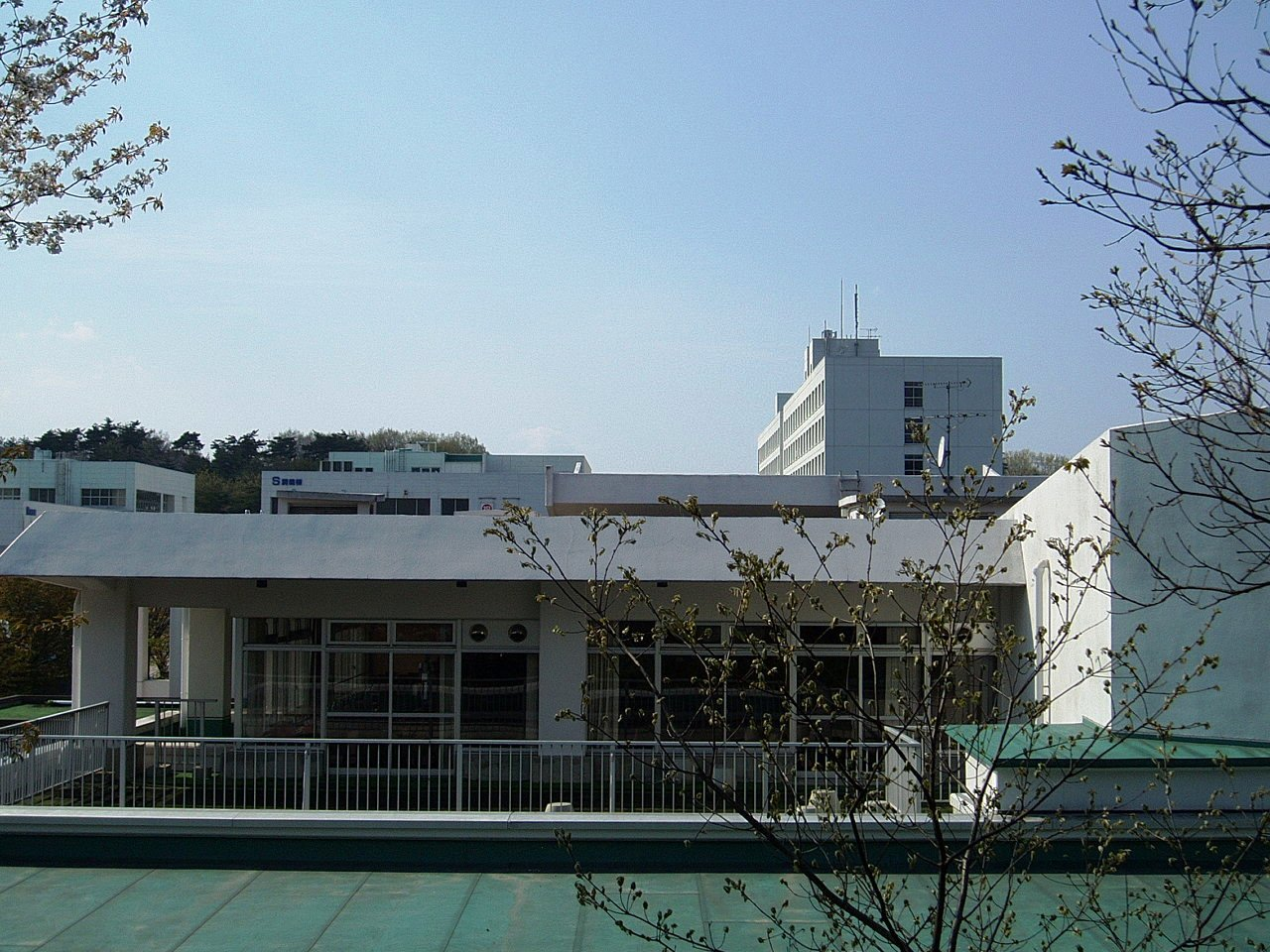
Fukushima University

Fukushima University (福島大学, Fukushima daigaku), abbreviated to Fukudai (福大), is a national university in Japan. The main campus is located in Kanayagawa, Fukushima City, Fukushima Prefecture.

== History ==
Fukushima University was established in 1949 by integrating three national colleges in Fukushima City: Fukushima College of Economics (福島経済専門学校, Fukushima keizai semmon gakkō; founded in 1921), Fukushima Normal School (福島師範学校, Fukushima shihan gakkō; founded in 1874) and Fukushima Youth Normal School (福島青年師範学校, Fukushima seinen shihan gakkō; founded in 1920).

The university at first consisted of two faculties: the Faculty of Liberal Arts (in Hamada-cho Campus) and the Faculty of Economics (in Moriai Campus).
In 1966 the Faculty of Liberal Arts was renamed Faculty of Education.
In 1979 the former two campuses were integrated into newborn Kanayagawa Campus.
In 1987 a new faculty was added: the Faculty of Administration and Social Sciences.
In 2004 the faculties were reorganized into two clusters (学群, gakugun) consisting of four faculties (学類, gakurui).

== Faculties (Undergraduate Schools) ==
- Cluster of Human and Social Sciences
  - Faculty of Human Development and Culture
  - Faculty of Administration and Social Sciences
  - Faculty of Economics and Business Administration
  - Course of Liberal Arts for Modern Society (in Machinaka Branch)
- Cluster of Science and Technology
  - Faculty of Symbiotic Systems Science

== Graduate Schools ==
- Graduate School of Education
  - Major in School Education
  - Major in School Subject Education
  - Major in Clinical Psychology and School Education
- Graduate School of Public Policy and Regional Administration
  - Major in Public Policy and Regional Administration
- Graduate School of Economics
  - Major in Economics
  - Major in Business Administration
- Graduate School of Symbiotic Systems Science and Technology

== Institutes ==
- University Library
- Research Center for Lifelong Learning and Education
- Center for Regional Affairs
- Center for Research and Development of Education
