= Minami-Fukushima Station =

Railway station in Fukushima, Fukushima Prefecture, Japan

Minami-Fukushima Station 南福島駅
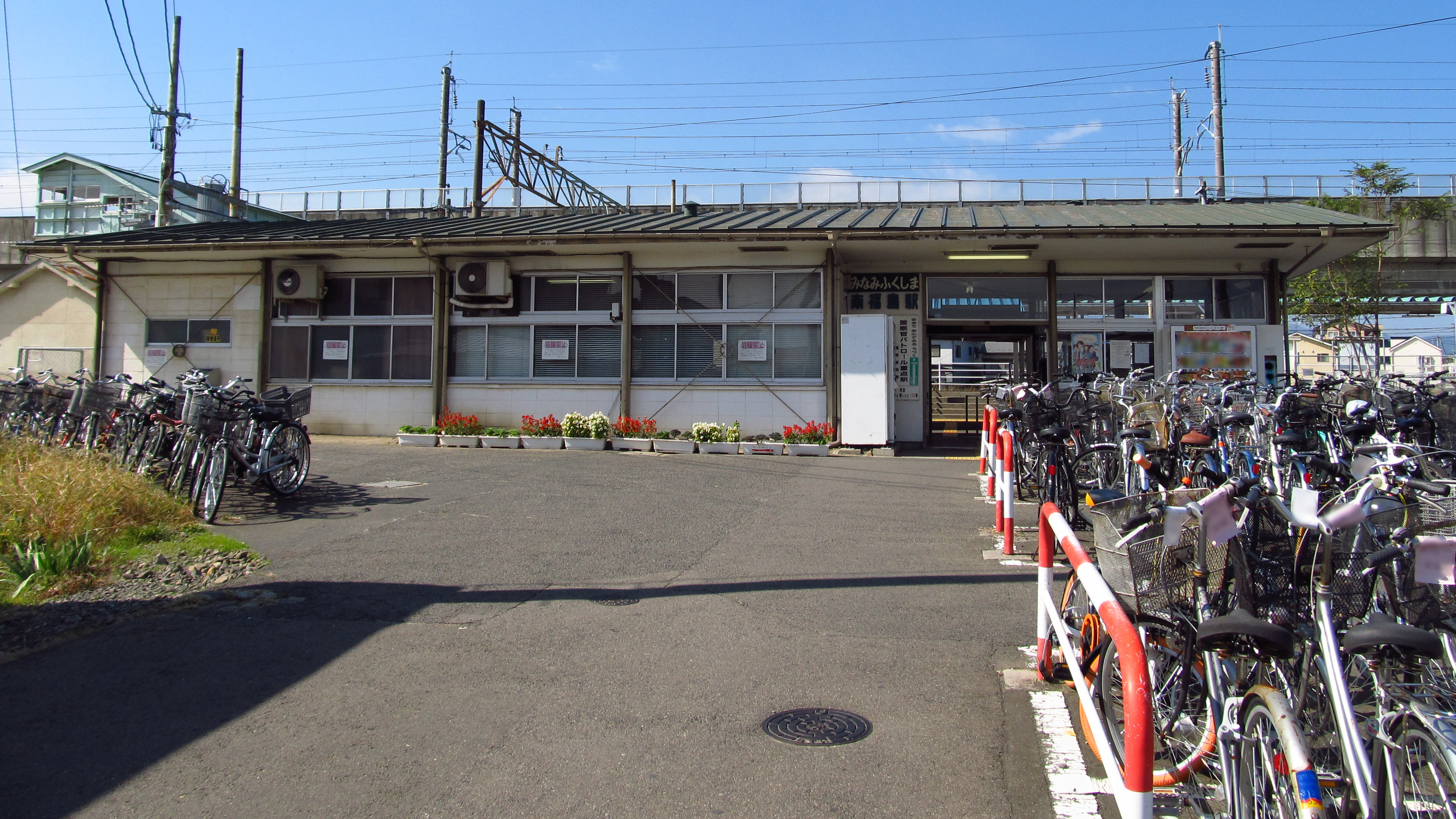
- Minami-Fukushima Station in October 2015

General information
- Location: Dannokoshi-25 Nagaikawa, Fukushima-shi, Fukushima-ken 960-1102; Japan
- Coordinates: 37.7235°N 140.4562°E
- Operator: JR East
- Line: ■ Tōhoku Main Line
- Distance: 269.4 km from Tokyo
- Platforms: 2 side platforms
- Tracks: 2

Other information
- Status: Staffed
- Website: Official website

History
- Opened: April 5, 1962

Passengers
- FY2018: 1769 (daily)

Services
Preceding station	JR East	Following station
Kanayagawa towards Kuroiso	Tōhoku Main Line Local	Fukushima towards Morioka
Location
- Location within Fukushima Prefecture Location within Japan

Minami-Fukushima Station (南福島駅, Minami-Fukushima-eki) is a railway station in the city of Fukushima, Fukushima Prefecture, Japan operated by East Japan Railway Company (JR East).

== Lines ==
Minami-Fukushima Station is served by the Tōhoku Main Line, and is located 269.4 rail kilometers from the official starting point of the line at Tokyo Station.

== Station layout ==
The station has two opposed side platforms connected to the station building by a footbridge. The station is staffed.

=== Platforms ===
1	■ Tōhoku Main Line	for Kōriyama and Kuroiso
2	■ Tōhoku Main Line	for Fukushima and Sendai

== History ==
The station opened on April 5, 1962, although a signal stop had existed at this location since 1916. The station was absorbed into the JR East network upon the privatization of the Japanese National Railways (JNR) on April 1, 1987.

== Passenger statistics ==
In fiscal 2018, the station was used by an average of 1769 passengers daily (boarding passengers only).

== Surrounding area ==
- Fukushima City Hall Tsugitsuma branch office
- National Route 4

== See also ==
- List of railway stations in Japan
