= 1947 Kamoke train massacre =

Massacre in Kamoke, Pakistan

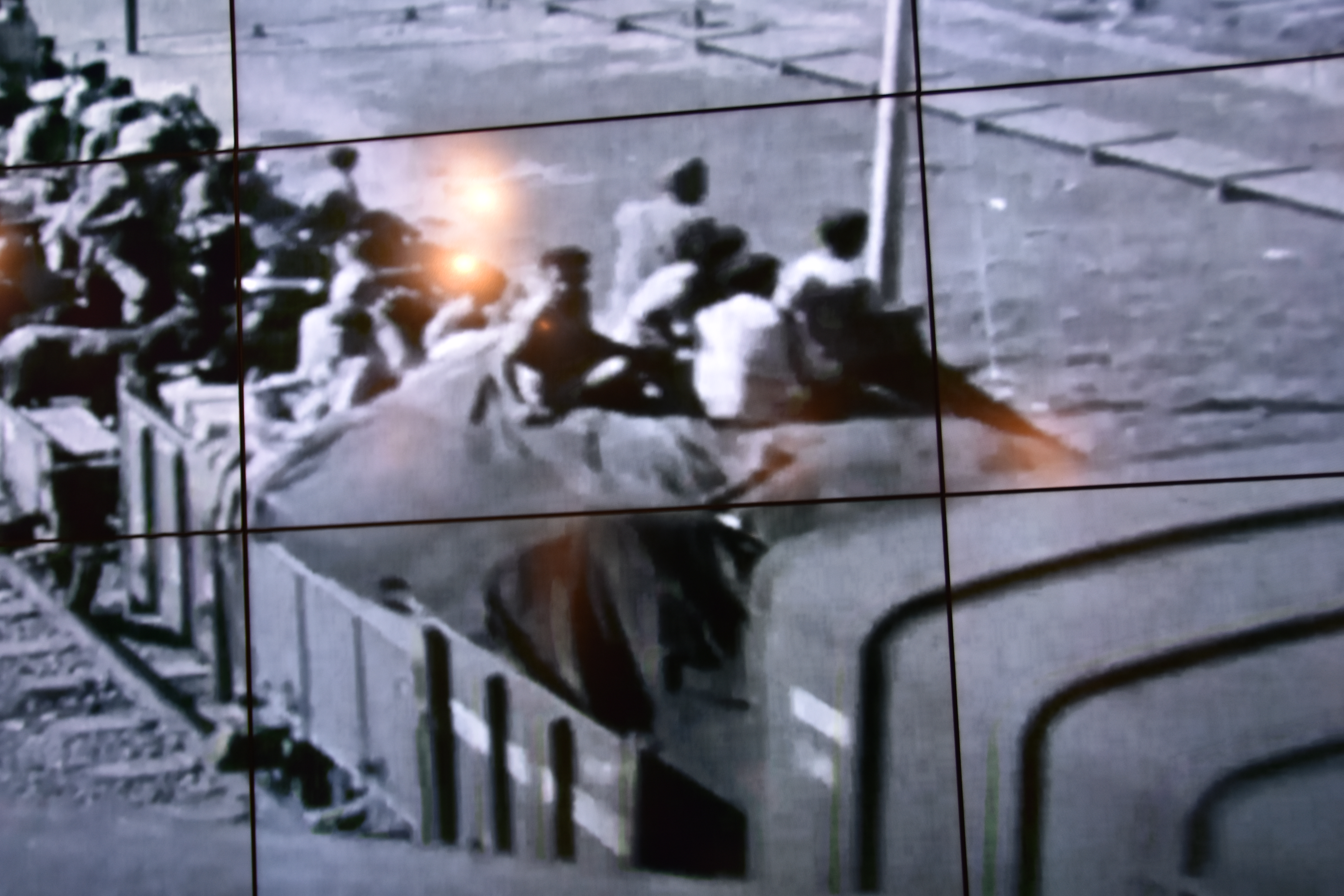
- A train full of refugees travelling between India and Pakistan in 1947
- Location: 31.9765147°N 74.2220167°E; Kamoke
- Date: 24 September 1947
- Target: Hindu and Sikh refugees
- Attack type: Massacre
- Deaths: 408 (per government report)
- Injuries: 587 (per government report)
- Perpetrator: Muslims

The 1947 Kamoke train massacre was an attack on a refugee train and subsequent massacre of Hindu and Sikh refugees by a Muslim mob at Kamoke, Pakistan on 24 September 1947 following the partition of India. The train was carrying approx 3,000-3,500 refugees from West Punjab and was attacked 25 miles from Lahore by a mob of thousands of Muslims. Figures for the number of people killed vary, with West Punjab officials reporting figures of around 400 and East Punjab-based reports suggesting thousands of casualties. Additionally, around 600 female refugees were abducted by the attackers. Local railway officials, Muslim League National Guards and local goons aided and participated in the massacre and the subsequent abductions of the surviving female refugees.

== Massacre ==
A train carrying Hindu and Sikh refugees from West Punjab was headed for India. Most of the refugees had been placed in open livestock wagons. The train was halted for the night, apparently due to damage to the track. Muslim gangs were seen roaming around the train through the night, and by morning a large mob of Muslims gathered outside the train. The train was attacked at noon and the refugees were killed. Young women and girls were abducted by the attackers. The attack is reported to have lasted 40 minutes. The Muslim attackers are reported to have attacked the train from the back. The troops which were escorting the train, consisting of 13 Hindu and 8 Muslim soldiers — reportedly fired upon the attackers and killed 78 of them. The train was reportedly taken to Gujranwala after the massacre so that the injured could be treated at a hospital.

=== Casualties ===
Initial reports put the number of dead at 340 and that of wounded at 250 as announced by the West Punjab government. In reports appearing a week from the incident, The Tribune reported that only 150 people had survived out of a total 3,500 refugees, suggesting a much higher death toll. G.D. Khosla states that “almost the entire body of passengers was killed”, and around 600 women and girls were abducted. A report by Pakistan's Punjab police put the figure of dead at 408, with an additional 587 injured. It also reported “a large number” of female refugees abducted.

== See also ==
- Rawalpindi Massacres
- 1948 Gujrat train massacre

== Bibliography ==
- Ahmed, Ishtiaq (2011), The Punjab Bloodied, Partitioned and Cleansed: Unravelling the 1947 Tragedy through Secret British Reports and First-Person Accounts, Rupa/OUP Pakistan, ISBN 978-93-5520-578-0, ISBN 978-0-19-906470-0
  - Ahmed, Ishtiaq (2022), The Punjab: Bloodied, Partitioned and Cleansed, New Delhi: Rupa Publications, ISBN 978-93-5520-578-0
- Khosla, Gopal Das (1989), Stern Reckoning: A Survey of the Events leading up to and following the Partition of India, Delhi: Oxford University Press, ISBN 9780195624175, OCLC 22415680
