= Mitaka incident =

1949 railway accident in Tokyo, Japan

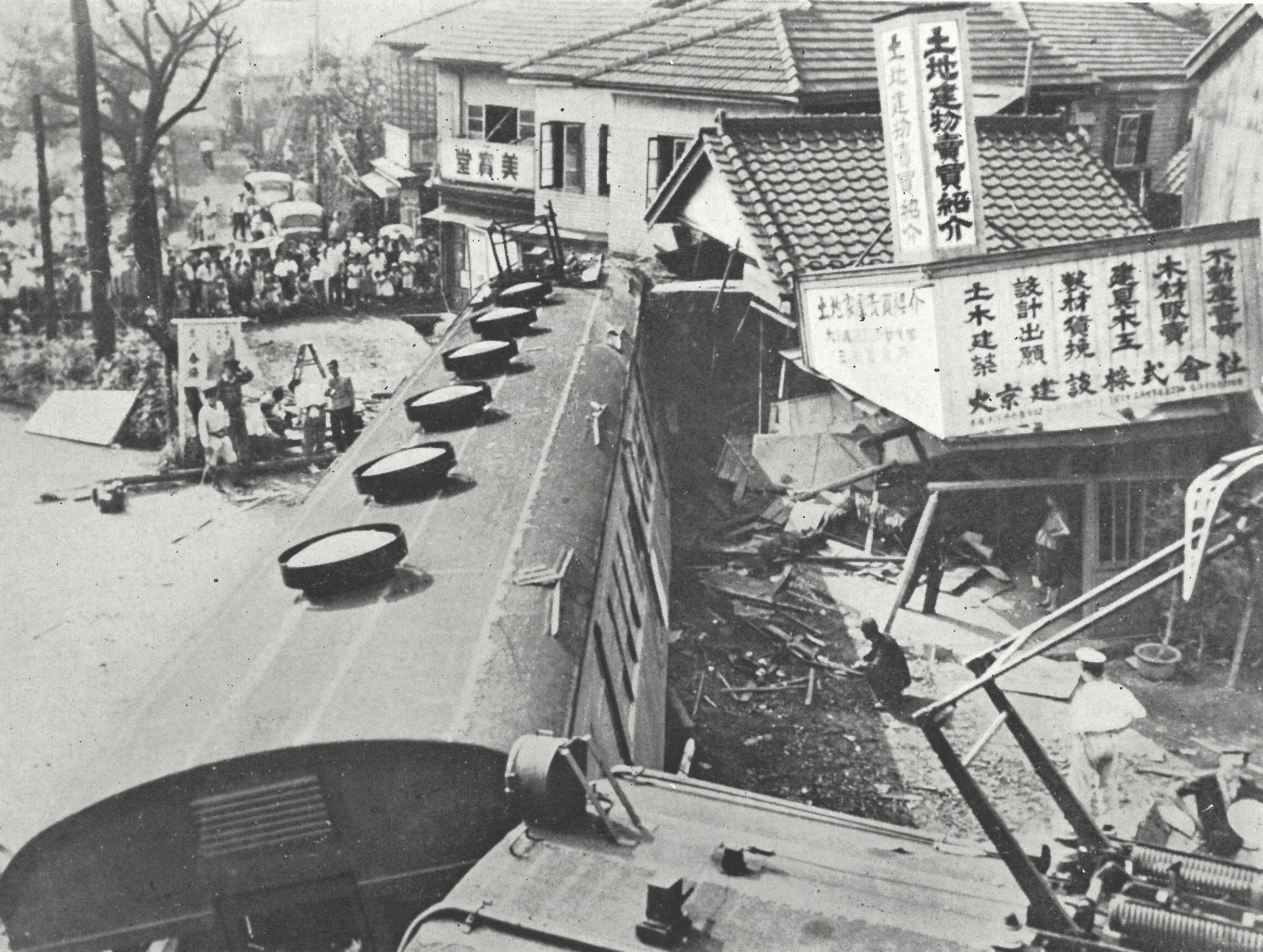
- Derailed train after the incident
- Location: 35°42′10″N 139°33′39″E; Mitaka, Tokyo, Japan
- Date: July 15, 1949; 21:23 (UTC+10)
- Weapon: Train
- Deaths: 6
- Injuries: 20
- Perpetrator: Keisuke Takeuchi (accused)

The Mitaka incident (三鷹事件, Mitaka jiken) was an incident that took place in Mitaka, Tokyo, Japan, on July 15, 1949, when an unmanned 63 series train with its operating handle tied down drove into and derailed at Mitaka Station on the Chūō Line, killing six people and injuring twenty. The incident remains a mystery, as do the Shimoyama and Matsukawa incidents which occurred during the summer of 1949.

The government indicted ten people on a charge of train sabotage resulting in death of the victims, as well as the train's conductor, Keisuke Takeuchi, who was not in the train when it derailed.

== History ==
On the day of the derailment, all four of the police officers at Mitaka Station had abandoned their posts; this was never explained. Two of the alleged conspirators were indicted for perjury. Takeuchi's lawyer refused to allow a co-worker to present evidence affirming Takeuchi's alibi that the two were visiting a public bath together when the train left the station, claiming it was "irrelevant to the case".

In a court ruling in 1955, the judge found there was no evidence of a conspiracy, but rather that Takeuchi had planned and executed the entire incident himself. Takeuchi was sentenced to death; the other defendants were declared innocent of all charges. All appeals of the verdict were rejected. All acquitted defendants were members of the Japanese Communist Party, but Takeuchi was not. Takeuchi died in prison in 1967 of a brain tumour. Until his death, he continued to proclaim his innocence while in prison for life.

In 2010, an article from The Japan Times mentioned that Takeuchi's confession was done under duress from police. In 2019, the Tokyo High Court denied a request to have a posthumous retrial for Takeuchi. His son, Kenichiro, mentioned that he was disappointed at the decision.

On April 17, 2024, the Supreme Court rejected the special appeal, confirming the decision not to allow the retrial to begin On September 5 of the same year, Takeuchi's eldest son filed a request for a third retrial. However, in October 2025, it was discovered that Takeuchi's son had died in May of the same year.

== See also ==
- List of rail accidents (1930–49)
