= Kanayagawa Station =

Railway station in Fukushima, Fukushima Prefecture, Japan

Kanayagawa Station 金谷川駅
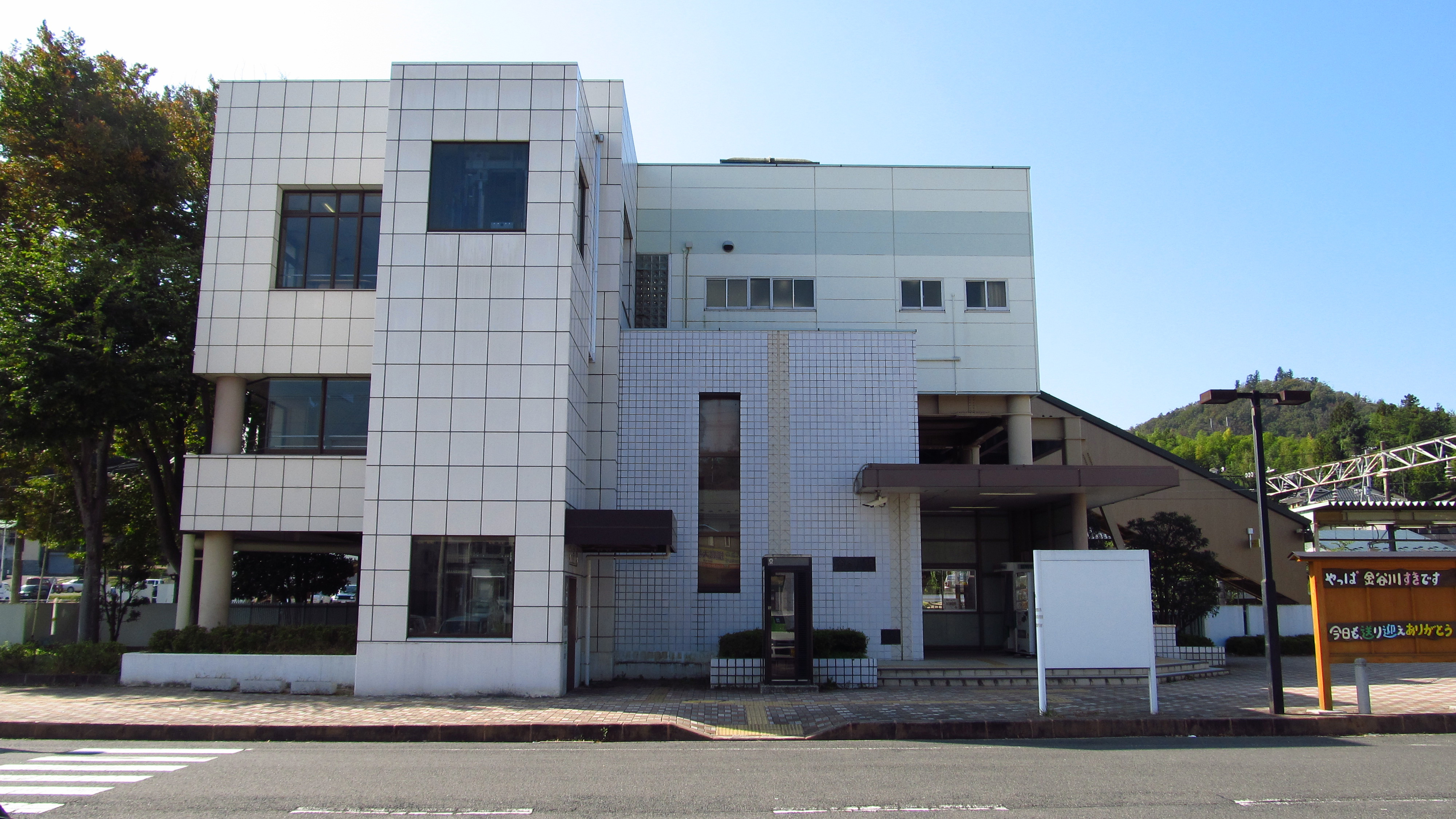
- Kanayagawa Station in October 2015

General information
- Location: Matsukawamachi Sekiya Sakashita 30, Fukushima-shi, Fukushima-ken 960-1244; Japan
- Coordinates: 37.6806°N 140.4521°E
- Operator: JR East
- Line: ■ Tōhoku Main Line
- Distance: 264.0 km from Tokyo
- Platforms: 1 island platform
- Tracks: 2

Other information
- Status: Staffed (Midori no Madoguchi)
- Website: Official website

History
- Opened: October 18, 1909

Passengers
- FY2018: 2886 (daily)

Services
Preceding station	JR East	Following station
Matsukawa towards Kuroiso	Tōhoku Main Line Local	Minami-Fukushima towards Morioka
Location
- Location within Fukushima Prefecture Location within Japan

Kanayagawa Station (金谷川駅, Kanayagawa-eki) is a railway station in the Kanayagawa area of the city of Fukushima, Fukushima Prefecture, Japan operated by East Japan Railway Company (JR East).

== Lines ==
Kanayagawa Station is served by the Tōhoku Main Line, and is located 264.0 rail kilometers from the official starting point of the line at Tokyo Station.

== Station layout ==
The station has one island platform connected to the station building by a footbridge. The station has a Midori no Madoguchi staffed ticket office.

=== Platforms ===
1	■ Tōhoku Main Line	for Kōriyama and Kuroiso
2	■ Tōhoku Main Line	for Fukushima and Sendai

== History ==
The station opened on October 18, 1909. The Matsukawa derailment, an alleged sabotage that resulted in the derailment of a train, occurred near the station on August 17, 1949. The station was absorbed into the JR East network upon the privatization of the Japanese National Railways (JNR) on April 1, 1987.

== Passenger statistics ==
In fiscal 2018, the station was used by an average of 2886 passengers daily (boarding passengers only).

== See also ==
- List of railway stations in Japan
