= Stockton train wreck =

Train Wreck in Stockton, 1944

Coordinates: 30°57′00″N 82°58′20″W

Details
- Date: August 4, 1944; 81 years ago 11:45 p.m.
- Location: Stockton, Georgia
- Country: United States
- Operator: Atlantic Coast Line Railroad
- Incident type: Derailment
- Cause: broken rail

Statistics
- Trains: 2
- Deaths: 47
- Injured: 41

The Stockton train wreck occurred on August 4, 1944 at 11:45 p.m. on the Atlantic Coast Line Railroad at Stockton, Georgia and killed 47 people, mostly black labourers returning home to Alabama for the weekend.

The 14-car train, en route from Waycross, Georgia, to Montgomery, Alabama, was traveling westbound on a single track line through Stockton at a speed of 65 mph (105 km/h), when a broken rail beneath the 9th car derailed the 10th through 14th cars into a siding where they collided with a freight train which had been standing there to let the passenger train pass. All the fatalities occurred in the 10th car which was "sheared practically its entire length diagonally from the floor on the right hand side to the juncture of the roof and side sheets on the left hand side". The rescue operation was hampered initially by lack of light before Army trucks from Moody Field at Valdosta arrived with searchlights.

The resulting investigation "found that this accident was caused by a broken rail, as a result of the presence of transverse fissures". It noted also that this railroad had reported 61 accidents during the previous 4½ years caused either directly or indirectly by broken rails.
