= Matsukawa derailment =

Railway accident caused by sabotage

Coordinates: 37°39′59″N 140°28′30″E

Details
- Date: August 17, 1949; 03:09
- Location: Between Kanayagawa and Matsukawa, Fukushima Prefecture
- Country: Japan
- Line: Tōhoku Main Line
- Operator: Japanese National Railways
- Incident type: Derailment
- Cause: Sabotage

Statistics
- Trains: 1
- Deaths: 3

The Matsukawa derailment (松川事件, Matsukawa jiken "Matsukawa incident") occurred at 03:09 AM on August 17, 1949 when a Tōhoku Main Line passenger train derailed and overturned between Kanayagawa and Matsukawa stations in Fukushima Prefecture of Japan, killing three crew members. Together with the Mitaka and Shimoyama incidents, it was one of three major criminal cases involving allegations of sabotage blamed by the government on the Japanese Communist Party and the Japan National Railway Union in the immediate post-war era. Twenty people were arrested and seventeen were convicted in 1953 (four of whom received death sentences), but eventually all were acquitted on appeal, and the case was closed without determining the real cause in 1970.

In 2009, Fukushima University announced that archive files detailing the incident were made public.

== Overview and investigation ==
At 03:09 AM on August 17, 1949, one month after the Mitaka incident, a Tōhoku Main Line passenger train hauled by a JNR Class C51 steam locomotive (C51 133) derailed and overturned en route from Aomori Station to Ueno Station. The locomotive overturned, killing three crewmen, and two baggage cars, two passenger cars and one mail car derailed. None of the 412 passengers were injured or killed. The accident site was the entry to a curved section of track past Kanayagawa Station, prior to reaching Matsukawa Station in Fukushima Prefecture.

Accident investigators found that the bolts and nuts on the track joints had been loosened, and a large number of railroad spikes fixing the rails to the sleepers had been removed, resulting in one 25-meter section of rail shifting 13 meters in the accident. Investigators also found a spanner and pry bar in a rice paddy a short distance from the crime scene. Suspicion immediately fell on Japan National Railway Union workers at the nearby Toshiba-Matsukawa factory and the Japanese Communist Party, due to recent protests over staff cuts. Ten workers from the Matsukawa plant and ten workers from the Japan National Railway were arrested and charged with sabotage resulting in death.

== The trial ==
During the first ruling of the Fukushima District Court on December 6, 1950, all twenty defendants were found guilty, largely on the strength of confessions forced by the police during interrogation. Five of the defendants received death sentences, and five were sentenced to life imprisonment. The remaining ten were sentenced to between 3.5 and 15 years. In the appeal ruling at the Sendai High Court on December 22, 1955 at which the defendants recanted their confessions and professed innocence, three of the defendants were found innocent, and the remaining 17 were again found guilty. Four received death sentences, and two received life imprisonment.

The cause of the defendants was taken up by author Hirotsu Kazuo, who wrote an essay in the literary journal Chuokoron, which led to an upsurge in support by leading intellectuals and literary figures, including Yasunari Kawabata, Naoya Shiga, Saneatsu Mushanokoji, Seicho Matsumoto, Eiji Yoshikawa and others. On August 10, 1959, the issue reached the Supreme Court of Japan, which referred it back to the Sendai High Court for a retrial. In the interim, it became public that a document confirming the alibi of the accused had been hidden by the prosecution during the previous trials. Forensic testing—showing that the spanner found near the accident site was the wrong size and could not have been used to cause the accident—had also been suppressed.

On August 8, 1961, in a retrial at the Sendai High Court, all defendants were found innocent. The prosecution protested the decision, but on September 12, 1963, the verdict was upheld by the Supreme Court. Legal proceedings dragged on until 1970, when the defendants were finally awarded compensation from the Japanese government for false arrest and imprisonment.

== In popular culture ==
Several movies have been made of the Matsukawa incident, including a 1961 expose film directed by Satsuo Yamamoto titled the Matsukawa Jiken, starring Ken Utsui. The production cost of 45 million yen was raised entirely by donation.

== See also ==
- List of rail accidents (1930–49)
- List of unsolved murders (1900–1979)
