= Stockton, Georgia =

- Unincorporated community Census-designated place
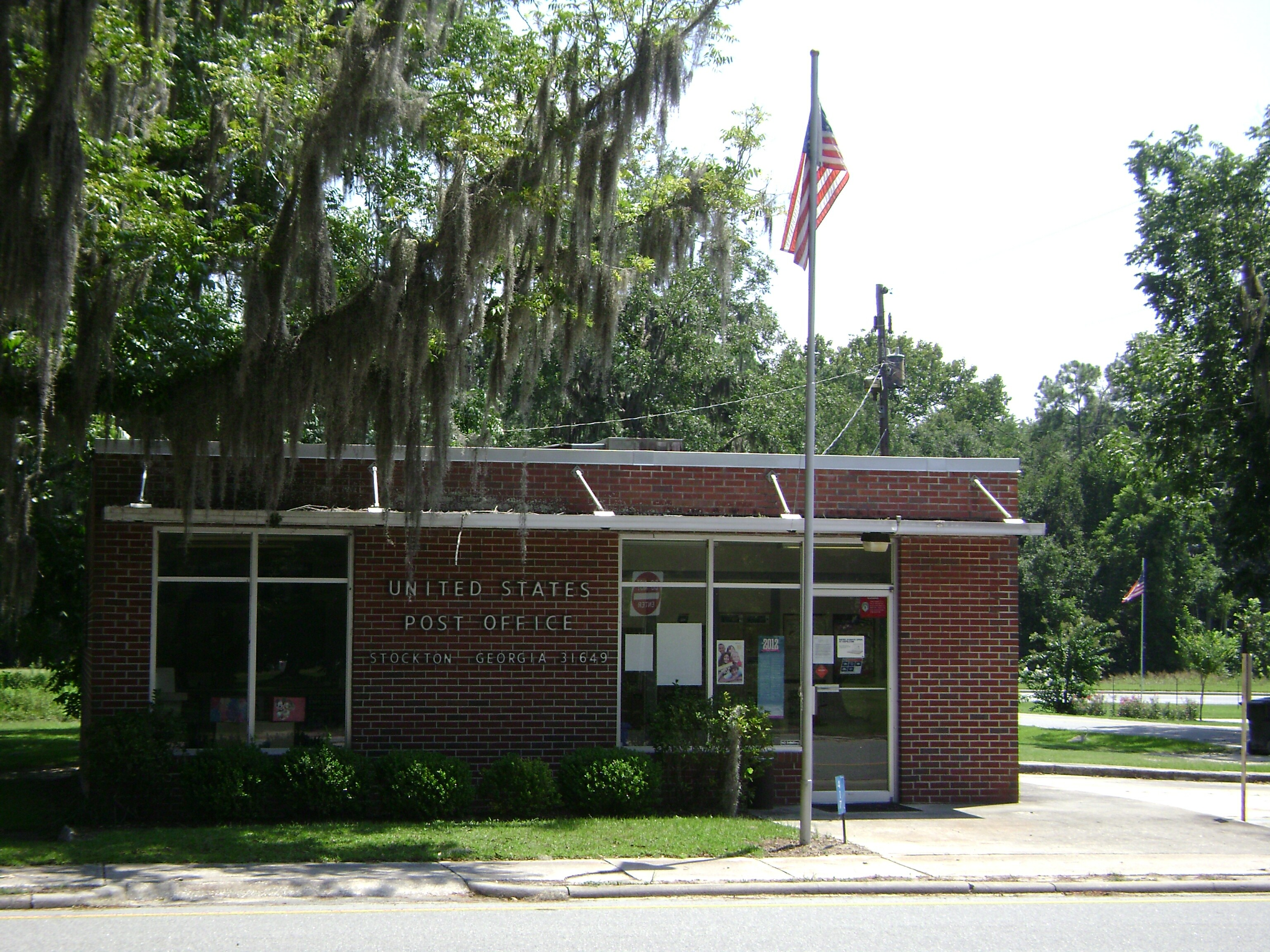
- Stockton Post Office

- Location within Georgia Location within the United States
- Coordinates: 30°56′26″N 83°0′32″W
- Country: United States
- State: Georgia
- County: Lanier

Population (2020)
  - Total: 135
- Time zone: UTC-5 (Eastern (EST))
  - Summer (DST): UTC-4 (EDT)
- ZIP codes: 31649

Stockton is an unincorporated community and census-designated place (CDP) in Lanier County, Georgia, United States.

Stockton is located in the far southern portion of the state on U.S. Highway 84, near Valdosta and Lakeland. The surrounding area produces tobacco, turpentine, pine lumber, and pulpwood. Moody Air Force Base is located nearby, and transport is provided mainly by U.S. Route 84 and U.S. Route 129. Stockton is located near the Alapaha River and CSX Transportation runs through Stockton at least twice a day. Stockton's zip code is 31649.

The 2020 census listed a population of 135.

== History ==
The community was named after one Mr. Stockton, a railroad official. Georgia General Assembly incorporated Stockton as a town in 1876. The town's municipal charter was repealed in 1995.

In 1944 the community was the site of the Stockton train wreck, a train derailment caused by a broken rail in which 47 people were killed.

== Demographics ==
Historical population
Census	Pop.	Note	%±
2020	135		—
U.S. Decennial Census; 2020

Stockton first appeared as a census designated place in the 2020 U.S. census.

Stockton CDP, Georgia – Racial and ethnic composition Note: the US Census treats Hispanic/Latino as an ethnic category. This table excludes Latinos from the racial categories and assigns them to a separate category. Hispanics/Latinos may be of any race.
Race / Ethnicity (NH = Non-Hispanic)	Pop 2020	% 2020
White alone (NH)	86	63.70%
Black or African American alone (NH)	38	28.15%
Native American or Alaska Native alone (NH)	0	0.00%
Asian alone (NH)	1	0.74%
Pacific Islander alone (NH)	1	0.74%
Other race alone (NH)	0	0.00%
Mixed race or Multiracial (NH)	5	3.70%
Hispanic or Latino (any race)	4	2.96%
Total	135	100.00%

In 2020, it had a population of 135.
