= Matsukawa Station =

Railway station in Fukushima, Fukushima Prefecture, Japan

Matsukawa Station 松川駅
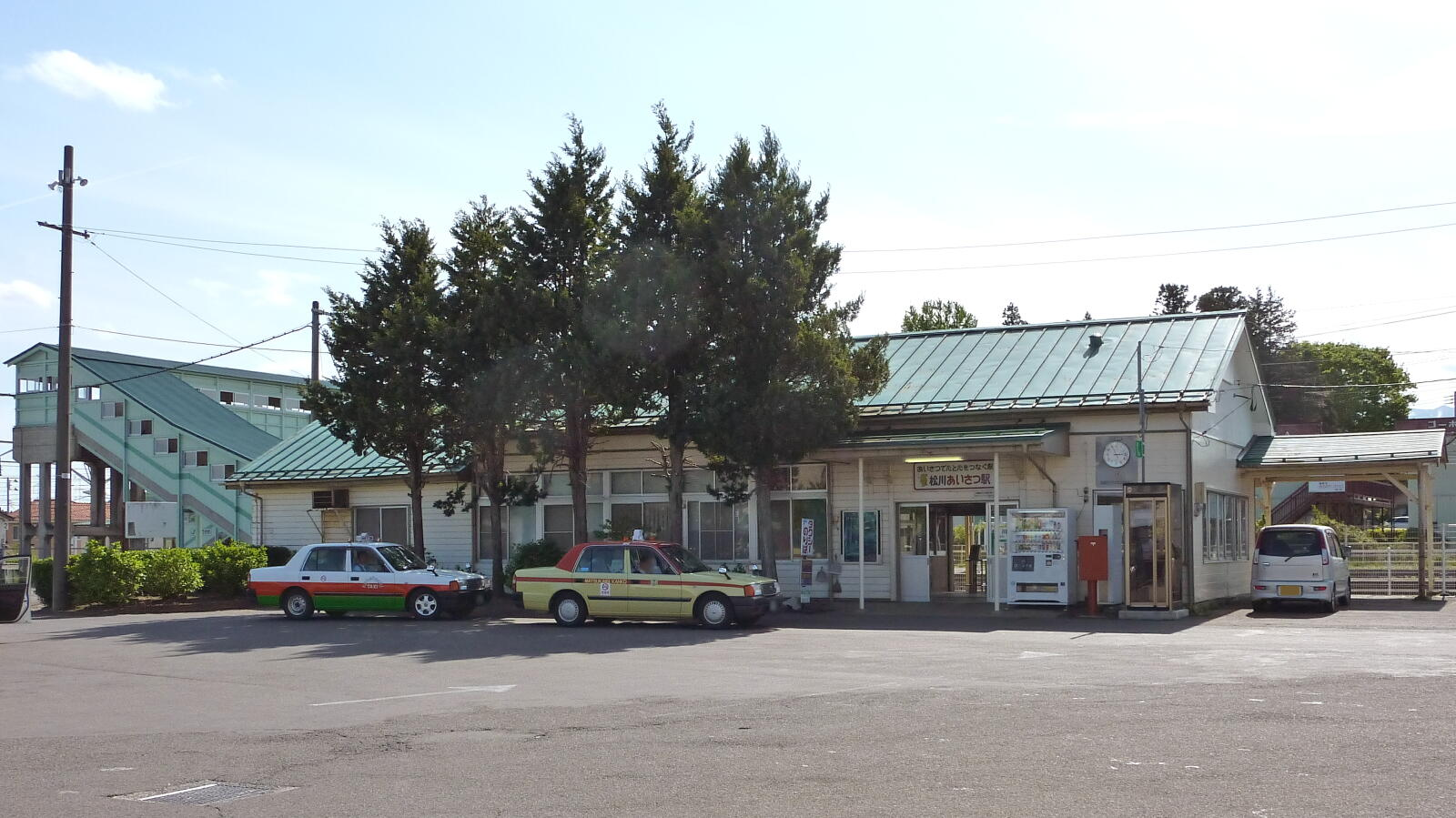
- Matsukawa Station in May 2009

General information
- Location: Hara-9 Matsukawamachi, Fukushima-shi, Fukushima-ken 960-1241; Japan
- Coordinates: 37.6538°N 140.4847°E
- Operator: JR East; JR Freight
- Line: ■ Tōhoku Main Line
- Distance: 259.5 km from Tokyo
- Platforms: 1 island + 1 side platforms
- Tracks: 2

Other information
- Status: Staffed
- Website: Official website

History
- Opened: December 15, 1887

Passengers
- FY2018: 1119 (daily)

Services
Preceding station	JR East	Following station
Adachi towards Kuroiso	Tōhoku Main Line Local	Kanayagawa towards Morioka
Location
- Location within Fukushima Prefecture Location within Japan

Matsukawa Station (松川駅, Matsukawa-eki) is a railway station in the city of Fukushima, Fukushima Prefecture, Japan operated by the East Japan Railway Company (JR East). It is also a freight depot for the Japan Freight Railway Company (JR Freight)

== Lines ==
Matsukawa Station is served by the Tōhoku Main Line, and is located 259.5 rail kilometers from the official starting point of the line at Tokyo Station.

== Station layout ==
The station has one island platform and one side platform connected to the station building by a footbridge. The station is staffed.

=== Platforms ===
1	■ Tōhoku Main Line	for Kōriyama
2	■ Tōhoku Main Line	for Kōriyama and Fukushima (starting trains)
3	■ Tōhoku Main Line	for Fukushima

== History ==
The station opened on December 15, 1887 when the Nippon Railway extended the line from Kōriyama to Shiogama. The Kawamata Line, running between Matsukawa and Iwaki-Kawamata operated from this station from March 1, 1926 to May 14, 1972.The Matsukawa derailment, an alleged sabotage that resulted in the derailment of a train, occurred near the station on August 17, 1949. The station was absorbed into the JR East network upon the privatization of the Japanese National Railways (JNR) on April 1, 1987.

== Passenger statistics ==
In fiscal 2018, the station was used by an average of 1119 passengers daily (boarding passengers only).

== Surrounding area ==
- Matsukawa Post Office
- Toshiba Electric factories
- National Route 4

== See also ==
- List of railway stations in Japan
