= 1948 Gujrat train massacre =

1948 massacre in Gujrat, Pakistan

- Part of the partition of India
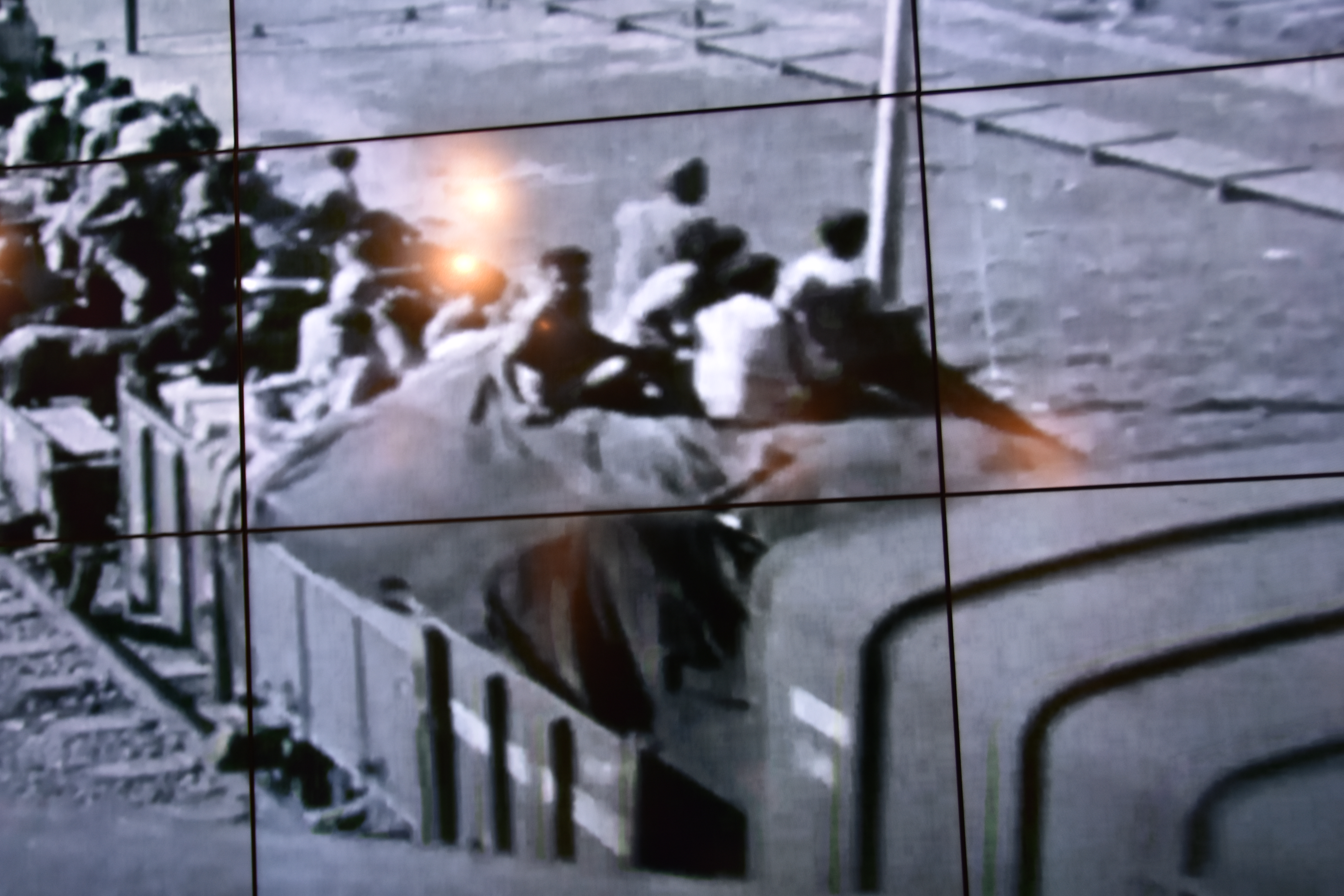
- A train full of refugees travelling between India and Pakistan in 1947
- Location: 32.5632297°N 74.0641426°E; Gujrat, Pakistan
- Date: 12 January 1948
- Target: Hindu and Sikh refugees
- Attack type: Massacre
- Deaths: 1,300–1,600
- Injuries: 150
- Perpetrator: Muslim Pathans

The 1948 Gujrat train massacre was an attack on a refugee train and massacre of Hindu and Sikh refugees by armed Muslim Pathans at Gujrat, Pakistan on 12 January 1948. 1,300–1,600 Hindus and Sikhs were killed in the massacre, 150 were wounded. The train was carrying 2,400 Hindu and Sikh refugees from the North West Frontier Province and taking them to India following their displacement due to the partition of India in August of the previous year. Only 750 of these refugees are reported to have survived and made it to India.

== Background ==
During the partition of India, around 14–18 million people are said to have moved across the newly demarcated border between India and Pakistan in one of the largest mass migrations in history. A majority of this migration happened in the Punjab province which was divided into two, with Muslims moving to the west and Hindus and Sikhs moving to the east. Around 3 million of these refugees moved in 673 refugee trains over a period of three months between August and November 1947.

== Massacre ==
A train carrying a total 2,400 Hindu and Sikh refugees left Bannu in the NWFP on 10 January 1948, and was moving towards India via Sargodha and Lyallpur. The train was being escorted by 60 soldiers of the Gurkha regiment. The train was diverted from its the original route, because the route was deemed unsafe. The passengers were told by the driver that the train would be taken to Rawalpindi; however, it was further diverted to Gujrat. The train arrived at Gujrat railway station, where the driver fled with the train engine, leaving behind the carriages carrying the refugees. A clash occurred between the soldiers escorting the refugee train and Pathans present at the station, with the latter attacking the train, and engaging in a gunfight with the soldiers. After the escorting soldiers ran out of ammunition, a mob of a few thousand Muslim Pathans attacked the train and began killing the refugees and looting their belongings. The attack is said to have been premeditated, and it is believed that the train was deliberately diverted to Gujrat where armed Pathans were present. The Pir of Manki Sharif is said to have overseen the attack.

== Bibliography ==
- Kaur, Navdip (2011). "Violence and Migration: A study of killing in the trains during the Partition of Punjab in 1947". Proceedings of the Indian History Congress. 72: 947–954. ISSN 2249-1937. JSTOR 44146786.
- Khosla, Gopal Das (1989), Stern Reckoning: A Survey of the Events leading up to and following the Partition of India, Delhi: Oxford University Press, ISBN 9780195624175, OCLC 22415680
