= Stará Kremnička =

Stará Kremnička Ókörmöcke
- Municipality
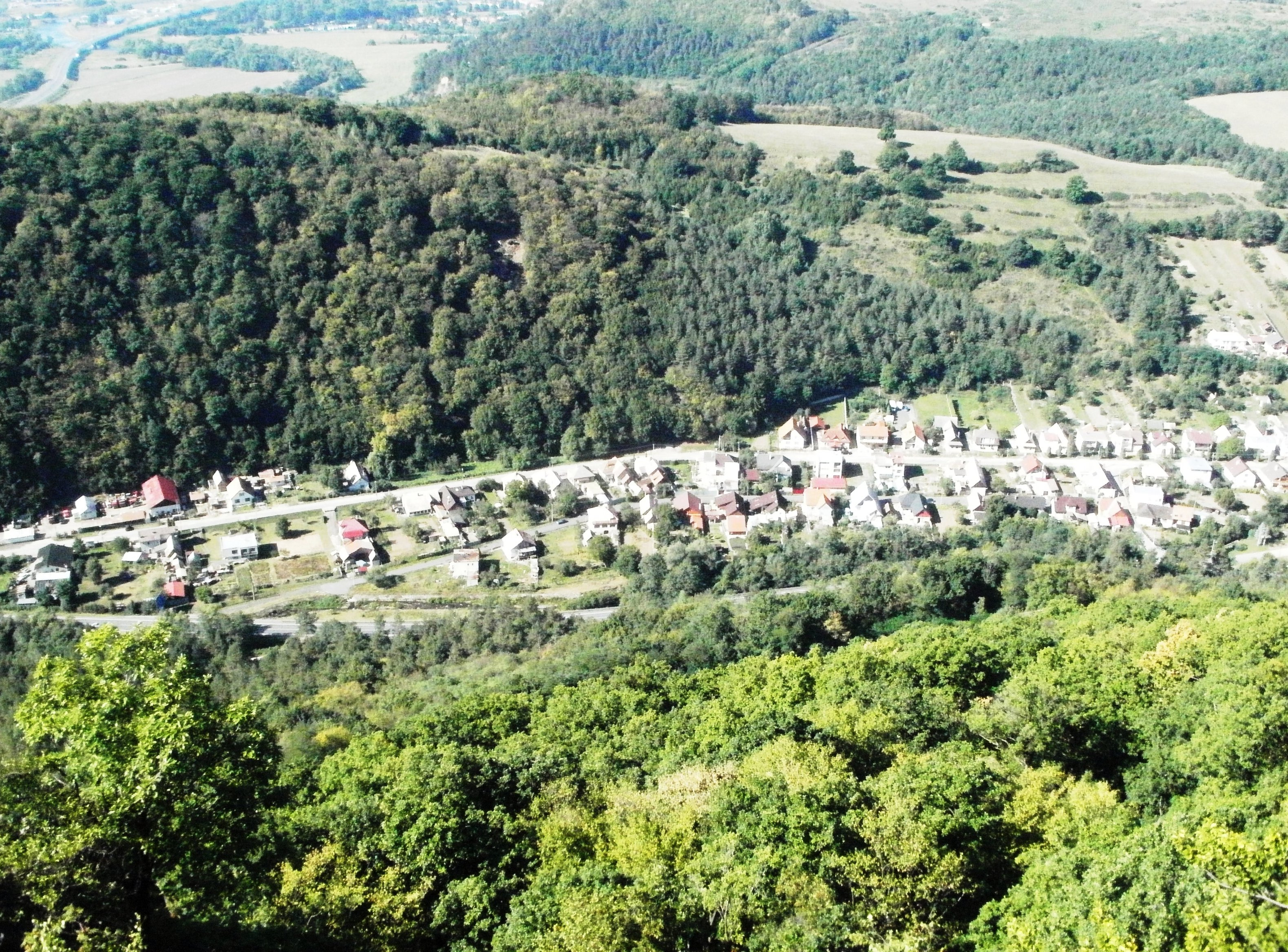
- Overlook of Stará Kremnička,

- Flag

- Location of Stará Kremnička in the Banská Bystrica Region Location of Stará Kremnička in Slovakia
- Coordinates: 48.60°N 18.90°E
- Country: Slovakia
- Region: Banská Bystrica Region
- District: Žiar nad Hronom District
- First mentioned: 1442

Government
  - Mayor: Stanislav Rigo (Ind.)

Area
  - Total: 13.49 km^{2} (5.21 sq mi)
- Elevation: 285 m (935 ft)

Population (2025)
  - Total: 1,099
- Time zone: UTC+1 (CET)
  - Summer (DST): UTC+2 (CEST)
- Postal code: 965 01
- Area code: +421 45
- Vehicle registration plate (until 2022): ZH
- Website: www.starakremnicka.sk

Stará Kremnička (Hungarian: Ókörmöcke) is a village and municipality in Žiar nad Hronom District in the Banská Bystrica Region of central Slovakia.

== Geography ==
The municipality lies at an altitude of 285 metres (935 ft) and covers an area of 13.49 km^{2} (5.21 sq mi) (2025).

== Population ==
Population statistic (10 years)
Year	1995	2005	2015	2025
Count	942	1092	1111	1099
Difference		+15.92%	+1.73%	−1.08%

Population statistic
Year	2024	2025
Count	1100	1099
Difference		−0.09%

It has a population of 1099 people (31 December 2025).

=== Ethnicity ===
Census 2021 (1+ %)
Ethnicity	Number	Fraction
Slovak	1081	95.57%
Romani	107	9.46%
Not found out	47	4.15%
Total	1131	

In year 2021 was 1131 people by ethnicity 1081 as Slovak, 107 as Romani, 47 as Not found out, 5 as Czech, 5 as Russian, 4 as Hungarian, 3 as German, 2 as Other, 1 as Irish, 1 as Moravian and 1 as Croatian.

Note on population: The difference values of population numbers in the table "Population statistic" and in the sections "Ethnicity" & "Religion" is caused by the use of various statistical methods.

=== Religion ===
Census 2021 (1+ %)
Religion	Number	Fraction
Roman Catholic Church	722	63.84%
None	267	23.61%
Not found out	83	7.34%
Evangelical Church	21	1.86%
Total	1131	

In year 2021 was 1131 people by religion 722 from Roman Catholic Church, 267 from None, 83 from Not found out, 21 from Evangelical Church, 9 from Greek Catholic Church, 8 from Christian Congregations in Slovakia, 8 from Seventh-day Adventist Church, 4 from Ad hoc movements, 2 from Other and not ascertained christian church, 2 from Jehovah's Witnesses, 2 from Other, 1 from Calvinist Church, 1 from Eastern Orthodox Church and 1 from Paganism and natural spirituality.
