= Zákruty =

Location
- Country: Slovakia
- Region: Banská Bystrica
- District: Žiar nad Hronom

Physical characteristics
- Source: Zákruty
  - location: Valley beneath Pisárovo and Sulina peaks, Vtáčnik
  - coordinates: 48.62189°N 18.73255°E
  - elevation: 698 m (2,290 ft)
- Mouth: Hron
  - location: South of Dolná Trnávka
  - coordinates: 48.54944°N 18.78606°E
  - elevation: 231 m (758 ft)
- Length: 11.47 km (7.13 mi)
- Basin size: 33.578 km^{2} (12.965 mi^{2})

Basin features
- Progression: Hron → Danube→ Black Sea
- Tributaries
  - left: Dúbrava, Trubínsky potok
  - right: Pisársky potok, Prestavlcký Potok

Zákruty is a brook in the District of Žiar nad Hronom in Slovakia. It is a right-hand tributary of Hron. With a total length of 11.5 km, it is classed as a watercourse of a third order.

== Etymology ==
Zákruty in the Slovak language translates to meanders.

== The flow ==
Zákruty is sourced in the Vtáčnik Mountains, in Lower Vtáčnik sub-range, on the northern slopes of Ivanišov Vrch at an altitude of about 680 meters. Other sources place the source of the boork at a higher altitude, south of Sulina Peak at 873 meters. It flows in south-western direction from the source, taking in Pisársky potok as it enters Žiar Basin. Some 300 meters downslope, it takes in Dúbrava and Trubínsky potok. The brook is the primary inflow into the like-named Zákruty Reservoir near Lovča. Beneath the reservoir, the brook meanders heavily and Prestavlcký potok flows into Zákruty east of Dolná Trnávka. South of Dolná Trnávka and north of Hliník nad Hronom, Zákruty flow into Hron as a right-hand tributary at the altitude of 231 meters above sea level.

During its flow, Zákruty forms a natural border between cadastres of Prestavlky and Lovčica-Trubín above the Zákruty Reservoir, as well as Lovča and Dolná Trnávka in the lower section.

== External sources ==
- Slovenský vodohospodársky podnik
