= Trubínsky potok =

Location
- Country: Slovakia
- Region: Banská Bystrica
- District: Žiar nad Hronom
- Municipalities: Lovčica-Trubín

Physical characteristics
- Source: Trubínsky potok
  - location: Eastern slopes of Sulina, Vtáčnik
  - coordinates: 48.62593°N 18.74918°E
  - elevation: 537 m (1,762 ft)
- Mouth: Zákruty
  - location: Hábová fields, south of Lovčica-Trubín, east of Prestavlky
  - coordinates: 48.593°N 18.79003°E
  - elevation: 274.6 m (901 ft)
- Length: 5.792 km (3.599 mi)

Basin features
- Progression: Zákruty → Hron → Danube→ Black Sea
- Tributaries
  - right: Trstenský potok

Trubínsky potok (also incorrectly Sulinský potok or Trnavský potok) is a stream in Central Pohronie part of the Hron basin. The stream is located entirely within the Žiar nad Hronom District. Trubínsky potok is a left-hand side tributary of Zákruty with a length of just under 5.8 kilometers. It is a watercourse of the 5th order.

== Etymology ==
Trubínsky potok was named after the settlement of Trubín, with the addition of -sky suffix and the potok appelative. The naming was settled in 1976.

== Flow ==
Trubínsky potok is sourced on lower eastern slopes of Sulina of the Vtáčnik Mountains, in the Lower Vtáčnik sub-range, at an altitude of just under 520 meters, over 350 meters beneath the summit. Briefly, it flows in a south-eastern direction, enters the fields of Žiar Basin at an altitude of about 480 meters, before shifting to a north-eastern flow. After a brief segment it turns to a lasting south-eastern and southern flow, which it maintains up to the mouth point. During the flow, it passes through the only settlement on its course - Lovčica-Trubín, after which's borough of Trubín the stream is named. South of Trubín, the stream creates an artificial reservoir, along with a tributary from southern slopes of Kameň hill (430 meters), which is by some sources identified as Trstenský potok, while other cartologic and geodetic registries omit the naming altogether. Further south, at an altitude of 274.6 meters, the stream flows into Zákruty.

== External sources ==
- Slovenský vodohospodársky podnik
