= Lovča =

Lovča may refer to:

- Lovča, Slovakia, a village in Slovakia
- Lovča, Croatia, a village near Donji Kukuruzari, Croatia
