= Jenő Ruffinyi =

Hungarian mining engineer (1846–1924)

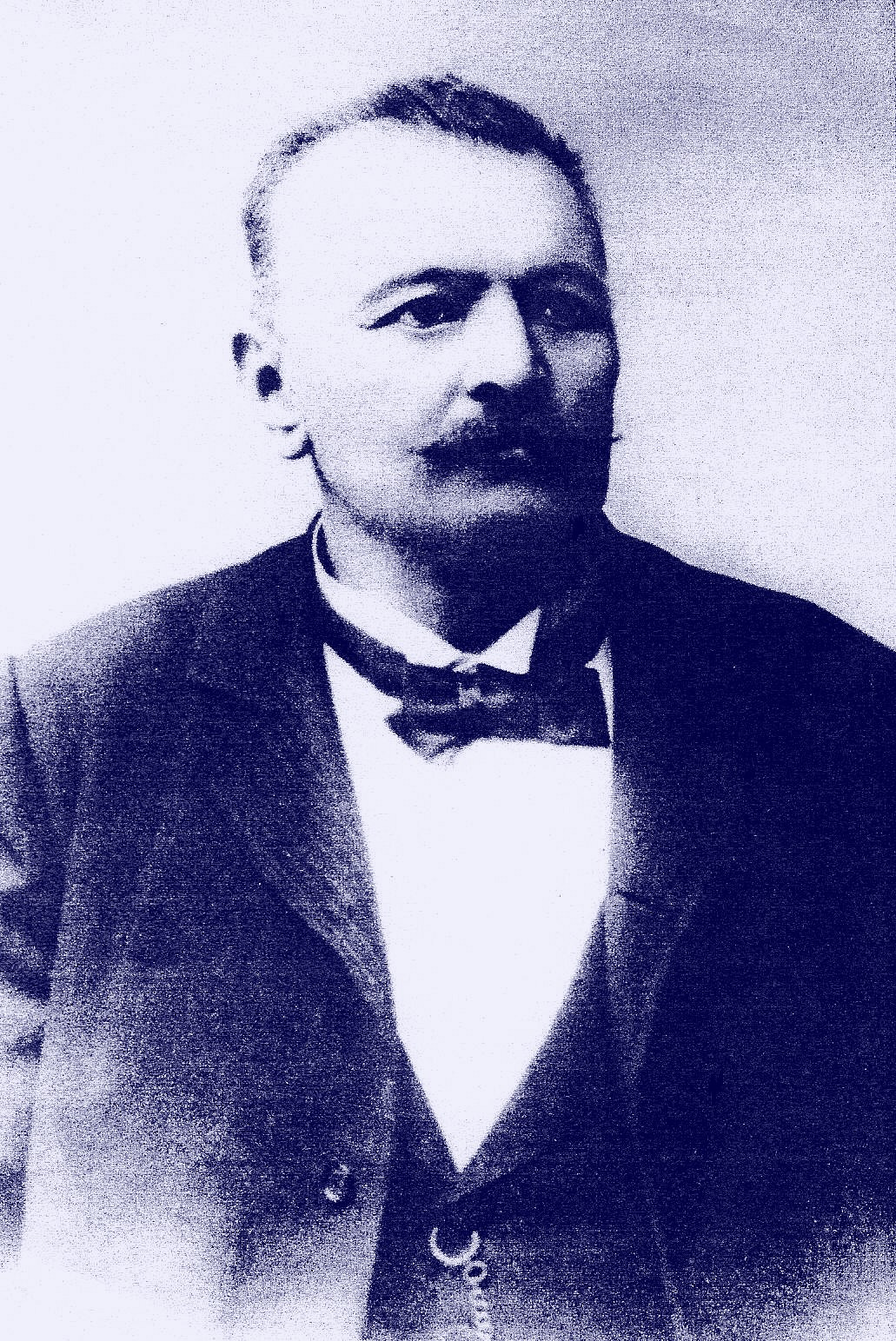
Jenő Ruffinyi

Jenő Ruffinyi (Slovak: Eugen Ruffínyi; 1 March 1846 in Dobsina, Hungary – 13 January 1924 in Dobšiná, Czechoslovakia) was a Hungarian mining engineer and amateur speleologist who, together with Gustav Lang und Andreas Méga, was the first to explore Dobšiná Ice Cave (Hungarian: Dobsinai-jégbarlang).

== Background and education ==
The Ruffinyi family had moved to Dobsina (today Dobšiná, Slovakia) from Italy because Eugene's father accepted a position as a mining engineer in this city. The original name of his family was Ruffini. Jenő attended primary school in Dobsina, and high school in Késmárk (today Kežmarok, Slovakia). He then took up mining studies in Selmecbánya (today Banská Štiavnica, Slovakia), where he earned his degree in 1869. On his return to Dobsina, he became a mining overseer and metallurgical inspector.

== Exploration of the Ice Cave ==
While touring Ducsa Hill near Dobsina with his friend, Lt. Gustav Lang, in 1869, Ruffinyi threw a stone into an opening in the rock that was known as Cold Hole (Slovak: Studená diera) in local lore. From the multiple and delayed echos, the men got the impression that a substantial cave must extend beyond the entrance and decided to return for an exploration. On June 15, 1870, Ruffinyi was the first to enter the cave, sliding down on a hemp rope.

== Honors ==
The elementary school in Dobšiná, Jenő Ruffinyi Elementary School (Slovak: Základná škola Eugena Ruffinyho), is named after Ruffinyi.

== Sources ==
- Krenner J.S., Die Eishöhle von Dobschau. K. Ungar. Naturwissenschaftlichen Gesellschaft, 1874
- https://web.archive.org/web/20160307081514/http://www.macse.org/gravestones/byname.aspx?i=R&i2=Ru&l=Ruffinyi&pn=0&pg=0&id=2838
