= Hnilec (river) =

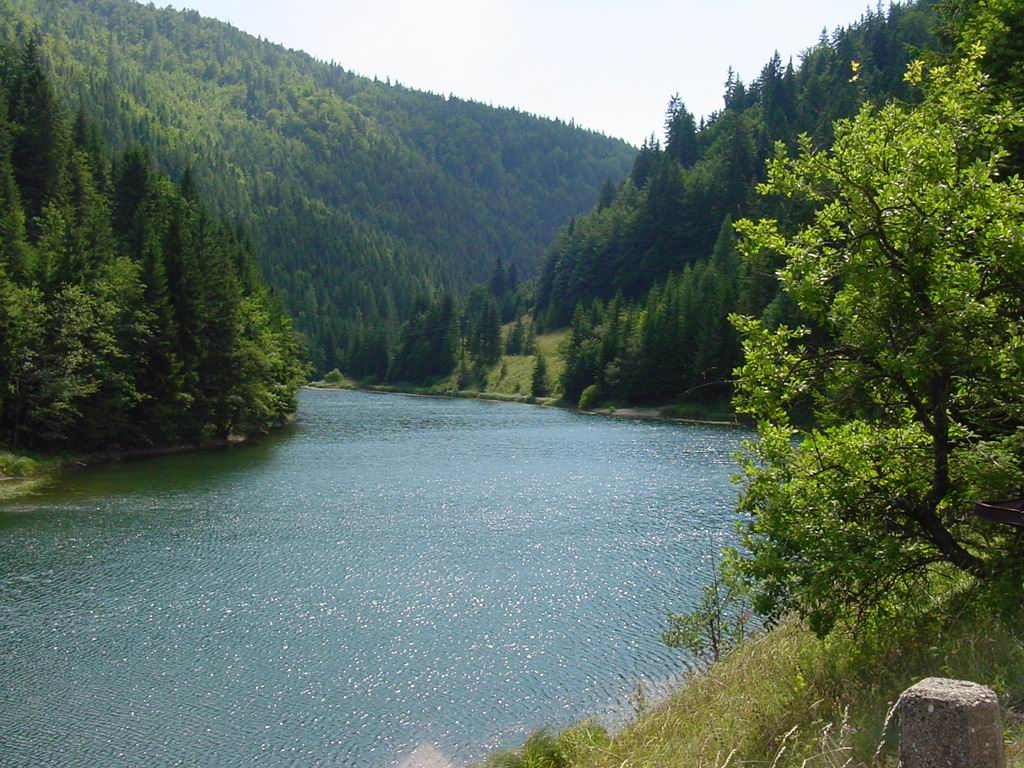
- Hnilec river on the Palcmanská Máša dam

Location
- Country: Slovakia

Physical characteristics
- Source
  - location: Low Tatras (Kráľova hoľa hill)
- Mouth
  - location: Hornád near Margecany
  - coordinates: 48.8878°N 21.0109°E
- Length: 91 km (57 mi)
- Basin size: 655 km^{2} (253 sq mi)
- Discharge
  - average: 8.1 m^{3}/s (290 cu ft/s)

Basin features
- Progression: Hornád→ Sajó→ Tisza→ Danube→ Black Sea

The Hnilec (Hungarian: Gölnic), German: Göllnitz) is a river in Slovakia. Its source is located below the Kráľova hoľa mountain, Low Tatras. It flows into the Hornád river near Margecany. The Palcmanská Maša dam is located on the river near Dobšiná. Places of interest along the river include Dobšiná Ice Cave and the Slovak Paradise. It is 91 km (57 mi) long and its basin size is 655 km^{2} (253 sq mi).
