= Telgárt =

- Municipality
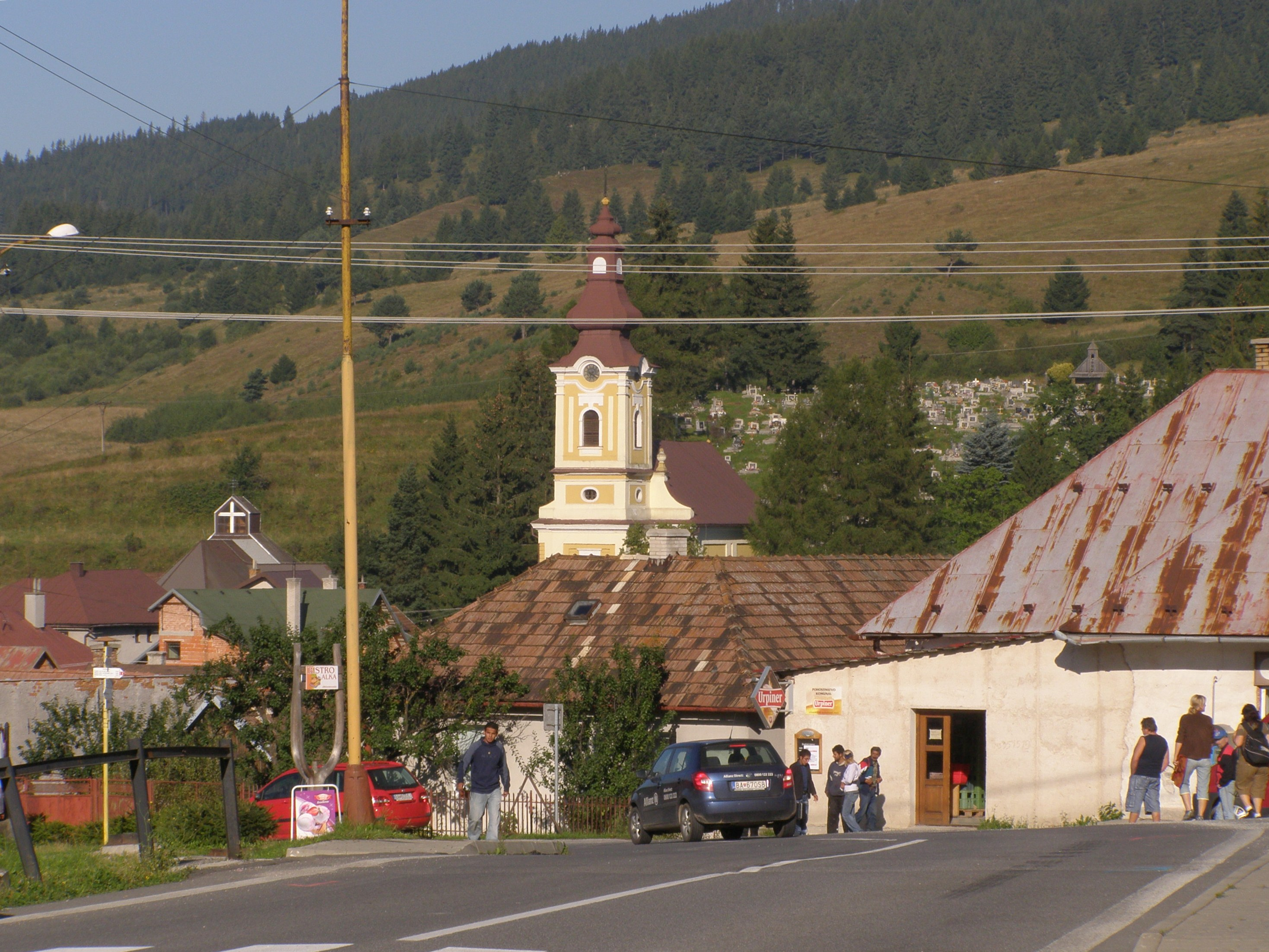

- Flag

- Location of Telgárt in the Banská Bystrica Region Location of Telgárt in Slovakia
- Coordinates: 48.83°N 20.18°E
- Country: Slovakia
- Region: Banská Bystrica Region
- District: Brezno District
- First mentioned: 1549

Government
  - Mayor: Vasil Černák (Ind.)

Area
  - Total: 56.00 km^{2} (21.62 sq mi)
- Elevation: 886 m (2,907 ft)

Population (2025)
  - Total: 1,517
- Time zone: UTC+1 (CET)
  - Summer (DST): UTC+2 (CEST)
- Postal code: 976 73
- Area code: +421 48
- Vehicle registration plate (until 2022): BR
- Website: www.obectelgart.sk

Telgárt (Hungarian: Garamfő, called Švermovo in 1948–1990) is a village and municipality in Brezno District, in the Banská Bystrica Region of central Slovakia.

== Etymology ==
The name originates from German Tiergarten (initially a hunting area, literally animal-garden). This name was adopted into Slovak as Telgárt. Between 1948 and 1990, the village was named Švermovo, after a Czech communist resistance fighter and participant in Slovak National Uprising, Jan Šverma. The Hungarian name, Garamfő, means "the spring/source of Hron", as the Hron river begins just a few kilometers east of Telgárt.

== History ==
In historical records the village was first mentioned in 1326, in 1549 it was referred as Thygart.

== Geography ==
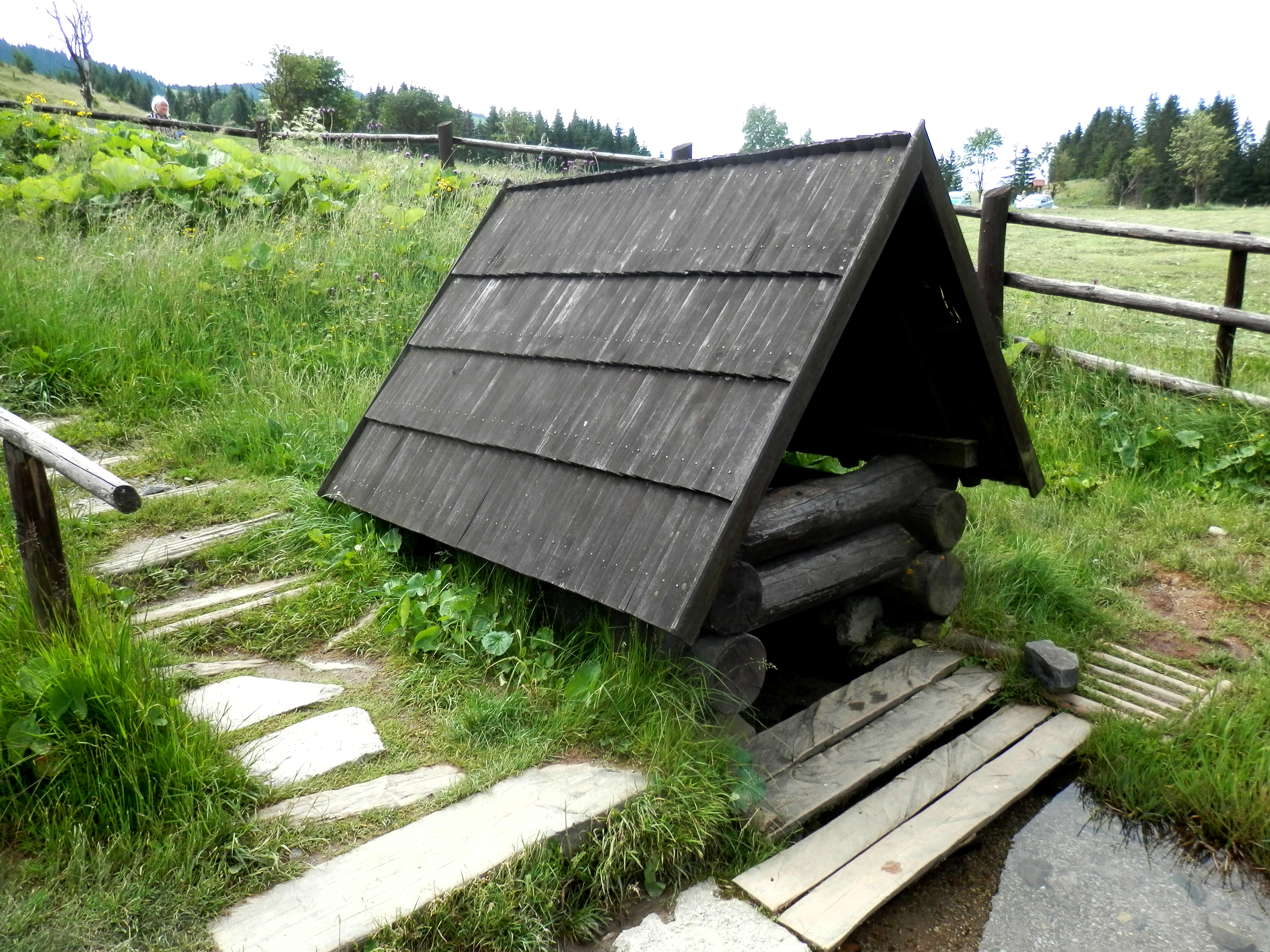
Hron near Telgárt

The municipality lies at an altitude of 886 metres (2,907 ft) and covers an area of 56.00 km^{2} (21.62 sq mi) (2025). The Hron river rises in the cadastral area of the village, under the Kráľova hoľa mountain.

=== Climate ===
Climate data for Telgárt: 906m (1991−2020)
Month	Jan	Feb	Mar	Apr	May	Jun	Jul	Aug	Sep	Oct	Nov	Dec	Year
Record high °C (°F)	11.7 (53.1)	13.8 (56.8)	18.1 (64.6)	23.5 (74.3)	26.7 (80.1)	29.9 (85.8)	30.3 (86.5)	32.9 (91.2)	28.2 (82.8)	24.1 (75.4)	20.4 (68.7)	12.2 (54.0)	32.9 (91.2)
Mean daily maximum °C (°F)	−0.2 (31.6)	1.3 (34.3)	4.9 (40.8)	11.4 (52.5)	16 (61)	19.6 (67.3)	21.3 (70.3)	21.2 (70.2)	16.2 (61.2)	10.4 (50.7)	5.2 (41.4)	0.2 (32.4)	10.6 (51.1)
Daily mean °C (°F)	−4.0 (24.8)	−3.1 (26.4)	0.1 (32.2)	5.7 (42.3)	10.5 (50.9)	14.1 (57.4)	15.7 (60.3)	15.3 (59.5)	10.5 (50.9)	5.9 (42.6)	1.4 (34.5)	−3.2 (26.2)	5.7 (42.3)
Mean daily minimum °C (°F)	−7.3 (18.9)	−6.6 (20.1)	−3.7 (25.3)	0.7 (33.3)	5.5 (41.9)	8.9 (48.0)	10.4 (50.7)	10.4 (50.7)	6.3 (43.3)	2.3 (36.1)	−1.6 (29.1)	−6.2 (20.8)	1.6 (34.9)
Record low °C (°F)	−22.8 (−9.0)	−21.6 (−6.9)	−21.3 (−6.3)	−12.9 (8.8)	−5.3 (22.5)	−0.2 (31.6)	1.9 (35.4)	1.1 (34.0)	−3.0 (26.6)	−12.3 (9.9)	−14.0 (6.8)	−20.0 (−4.0)	−22.8 (−9.0)
Average precipitation mm (inches)	39.3 (1.55)	41.9 (1.65)	49.9 (1.96)	65.5 (2.58)	105.4 (4.15)	116.6 (4.59)	118.9 (4.68)	101.7 (4.00)	74.9 (2.95)	70.5 (2.78)	69.0 (2.72)	45.1 (1.78)	898.7 (35.39)
Average precipitation days (≥ 1.0 mm)	7.7	8.0	8.4	8.9	13.3	12.2	12.4	10.1	8.3	8.9	8.8	8.9	115.9
Average snowy days	27.3	24.4	17.8	3.2	0.0	0.0	0.0	0.0	0.0	1.1	6.8	21.9	102.5
Source: NOAA

== Population ==
Population statistic (10 years)
Year	1995	2005	2015	2025
Count	1620	1538	1542	1517
Difference		−5.06%	+0.26%	−1.62%

Population statistic
Year	2024	2025
Count	1506	1517
Difference		+0.73%

It has a population of 1517 people (31 December 2025).

=== Ethnicity ===
Census 2021 (1+ %)
Ethnicity	Number	Fraction
Slovak	1201	80.12%
Romani	215	14.34%
Not found out	169	11.27%
Total	1499	

In year 2021 was 1499 people by ethnicity 1201 as Slovak, 215 as Romani, 169 as Not found out, 6 as Rusyn, 2 as Czech, 1 as Russian, 1 as German and 1 as Hungarian.

Note on population: The difference values of population numbers in the table "Population statistic" and in the sections "Ethnicity" & "Religion" is caused by the use of various statistical methods.

=== Religion ===
Census 2021 (1+ %)
Religion	Number	Fraction
Greek Catholic Church	695	46.36%
None	432	28.82%
Roman Catholic Church	177	11.81%
Not found out	145	9.67%
Eastern Orthodox Church	31	2.07%
Total	1499	

In year 2021 was 1499 people by religion 695 from Greek Catholic Church, 432 from None, 177 from Roman Catholic Church, 145 from Not found out, 31 from Eastern Orthodox Church, 11 from Evangelical Church, 3 from Other and not ascertained christian church, 3 from Christian Congregations in Slovakia and 2 from Ad hoc movements.
