= Dobšiná Ice Cave =

UNESCO World Heritage Site
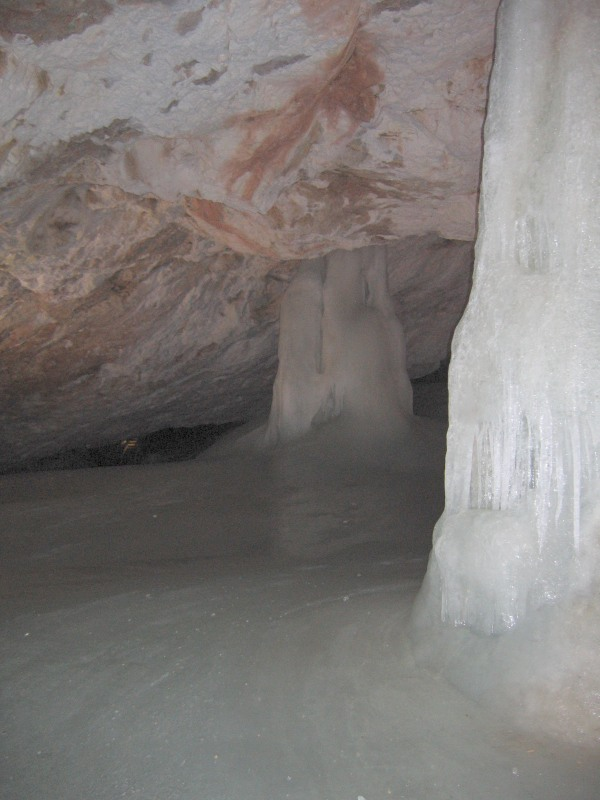

- Location within Slovakia
- Location: Rožňava District, Slovakia
- Part of: Caves of Aggtelek Karst and Slovak Karst
- Criteria: Natural: (viii)
- Reference: 725ter-007
- Inscription: 1995 (19th Session)
- Extensions: 2000, 2008
- Area: 600 ha (1,500 acres)
- Buffer zone: 19,763 ha (48,840 acres)
- Coordinates: 48°52′19″N 20°17′41″E

Dobšiná Ice Cave (Slovak: Dobšinská ľadová jaskyňa; Hungarian: Dobsinai-jégbarlang) is an ice cave in Slovakia, near the mining town of Dobšiná in the Slovak Paradise. Since 2000 it has been included on the UNESCO World Heritage list as a part of the Caves of Aggtelek Karst and Slovak Karst site, because of its unique cave formations and its natural beauty.

Famous visitors to the ice cave have been Prince August von Sachsen Gotha and his wife (1872), Ferdinand de Lesseps (constructor of the Suez Channel) and a party of French writers (1884), Bulgarian Czar Ferdinand I (1890), and the polar explorer Fridtjof Nansen (1900).

With the entrance at 920 m a.s.l, it is one of the lowest ice caves in the world.

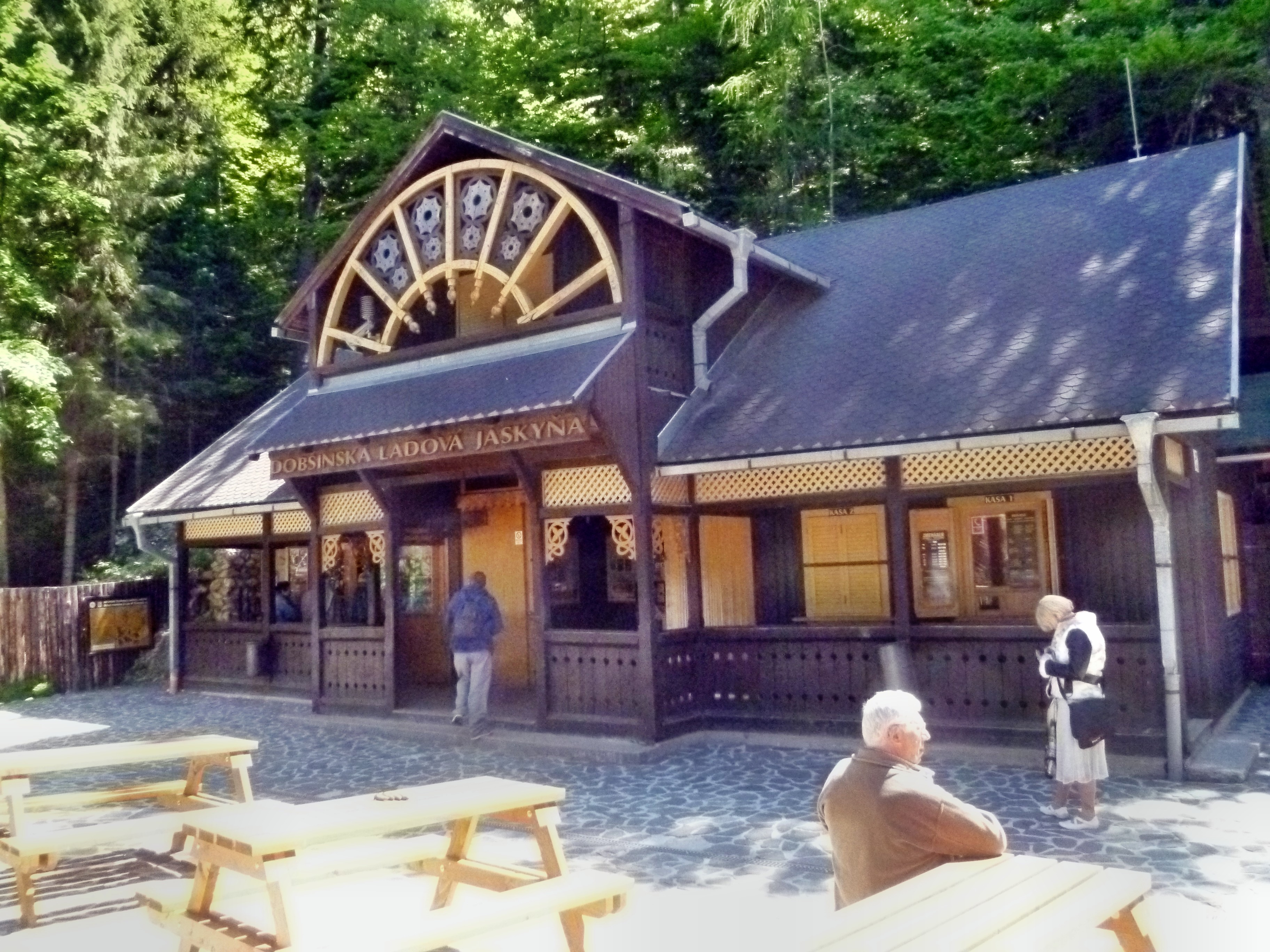
Entrance to Dobšiná Ice Cave

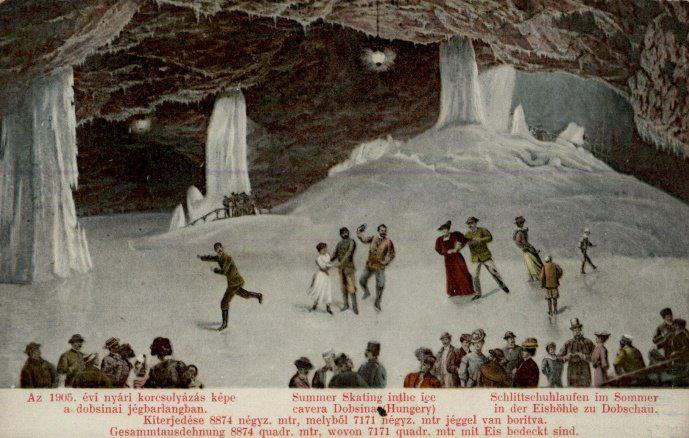
Summer skating in the cave (1905)

== History ==
The cave was discovered on 15 June 1870 by the royal mining engineer Jenő Ruffinyi, accompanied by Gustáv Lang and Andrej Mega, although the entrance was known from time immemorial by shepherds and hunters as Studená diera (Cold Hole). The cave was opened to the public one year after its discovery. In 1887, it was the first electrically lit cave in Europe.

At about this time 7,171 square metres of the cave's known area of 8,874 square metres were reported covered with ice. The total ice volume was estimated at 125,000 cubic metres, which makes it one of the most important ice caves in the world. The thickness of the ice reaches up to 26.5 m.

The cave floor descends from the entrance which faces North; this results in rapid cooling of the cave in winter as cold air can fall down. On the other hand, the interior is quite protected from the warm environment in summer. Thus the annual temperature average stays around 0 °C. The cave iced up, as this cycle repeated for many centuries. The age of the cave is estimated at 250,000 years.

It lies 130 m above the Hnilec River, and the entrance is at an altitude of 971 m. The total length of the cave is 1,491 m (some sources claim 1,232 m), of which 475 m plus individual 43 m are open to the public from May to September.
