= Kráľova hoľa =

Mountain in Slovakia

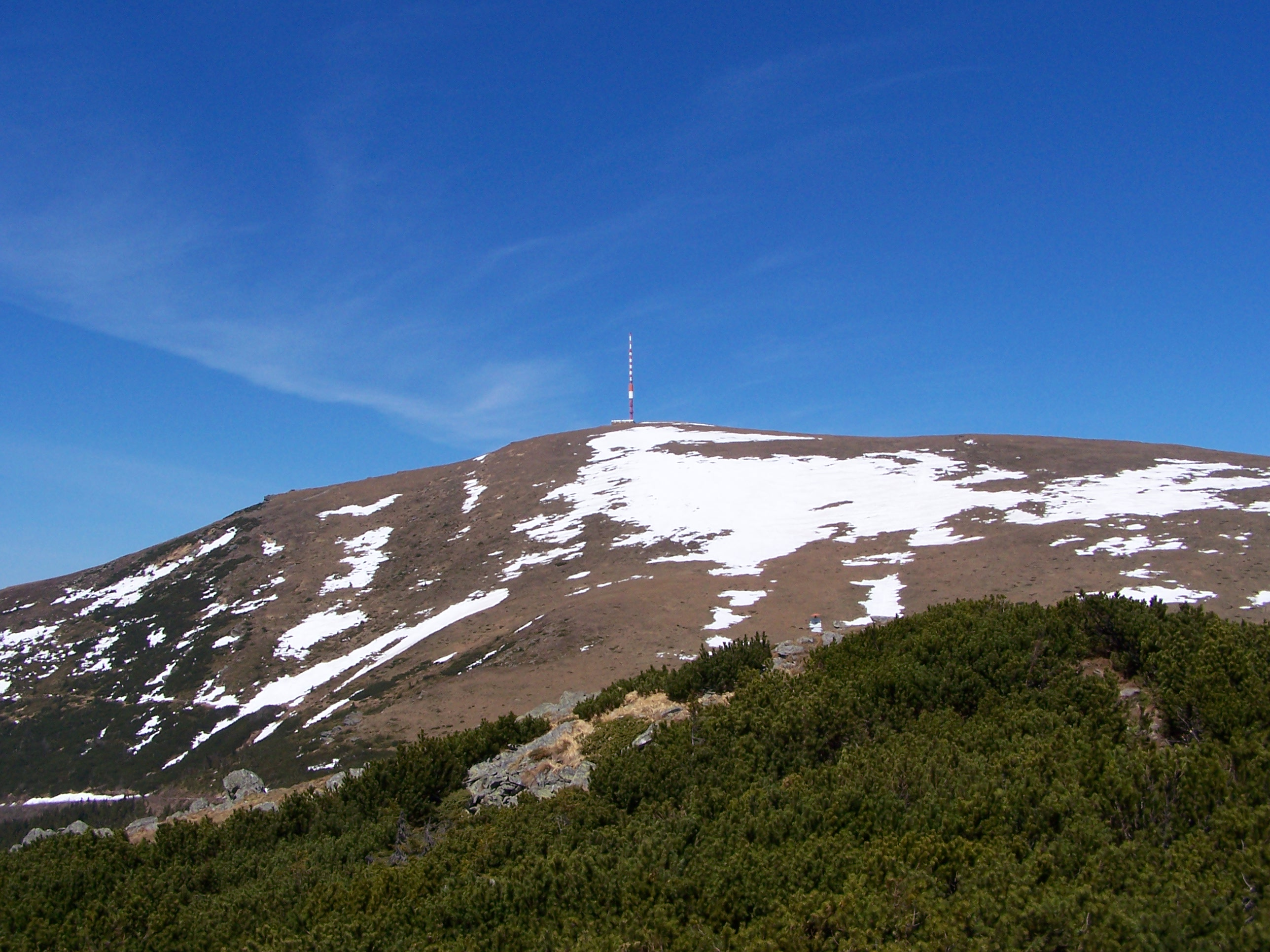
- Kráľova hoľa

Highest point
- Elevation: 1,946 m (6,385 ft)
- Coordinates: 48°53′N 20°8′E

Geography
- Location within Slovakia
- Location: Low Tatras National Park, Banská Bystrica, Slovakia
- Parent range: Low Tatras

Climbing
- Easiest route: hike

Kráľova hoľa (Slovak pronunciation: [ˈkraːʎɔʋa ˈɦɔʎa]; German: Königsberg; Hungarian: Király-hegy, literally "King's Mountain") is the highest mountain (1,946 m) of the eastern part of the Low Tatras in central Slovakia. Four rivers rise at its foot: Čierny Váh, Hnilec, Hornád, and Hron. The summit, easily accessible by hiking trails from Telgárt as well as by a paved road from Šumiac (not open to motor vehicles, except for the mountain rescue service and maintenance workers of the TV transmitter on the summit), offers a panoramic view of Spiš, the Tatras, Liptov, and the Upper Hron Valley. Largely deforested by exploitative timber harvesting in the early 19th century, its timberline was restored to its natural elevation of about 1,650 m (5,413 ft.) through the efforts of Ludwig Greiner in the second half of that century.

Kráľova hoľa is often depicted in Slovak folklore and Romantic poetry as a safe refuge of heroes and highwaymen, in particular Juraj Jánošík. As a metaphor of homeland in folk ballads (such as Na Kráľovej holi) and particularly in one of the best-known Slovak poems The Death of Jánošík (1862) by Ján Botto, the mountain has become one of the informal Slovak national symbols along with Kriváň.

During the anti-Nazi Slovak National Uprising, the partisan group Jánošík had their shelters below the top of the mountain. In 1960, a TV transmitter with a 137.5 metres tall guyed tubular mast was built on the top. There is also a weather station and a station of the mountain rescue service.
