= Hornád =

Hornád Hernád
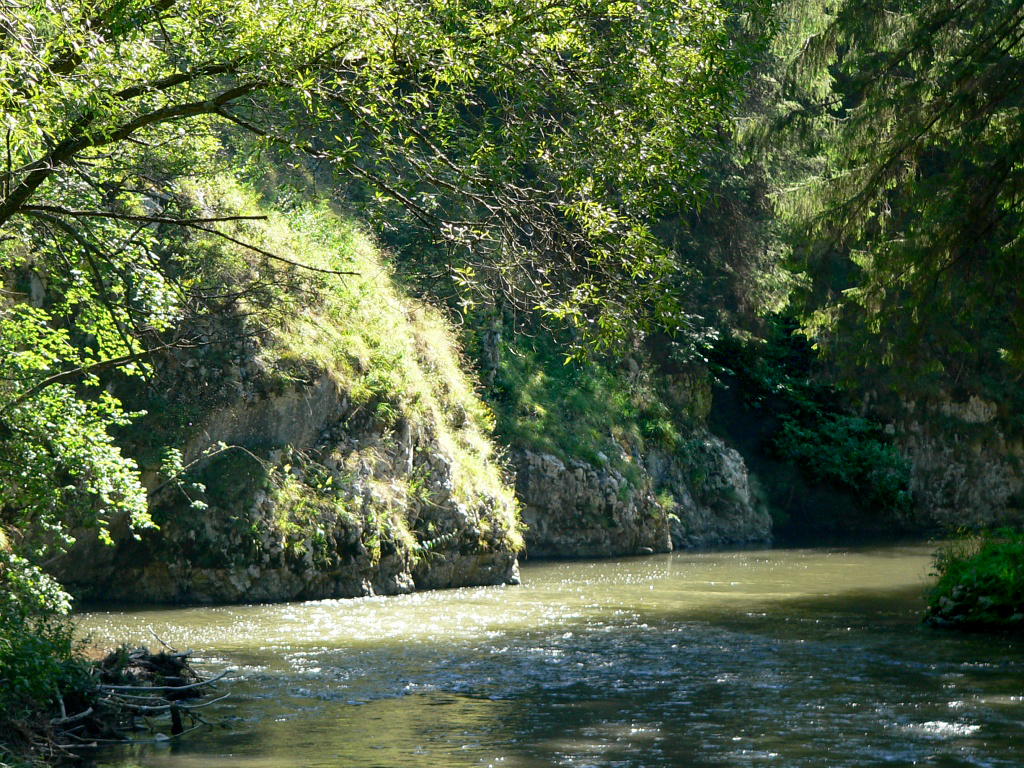
- The gorge of Hornád river in Slovak Paradise

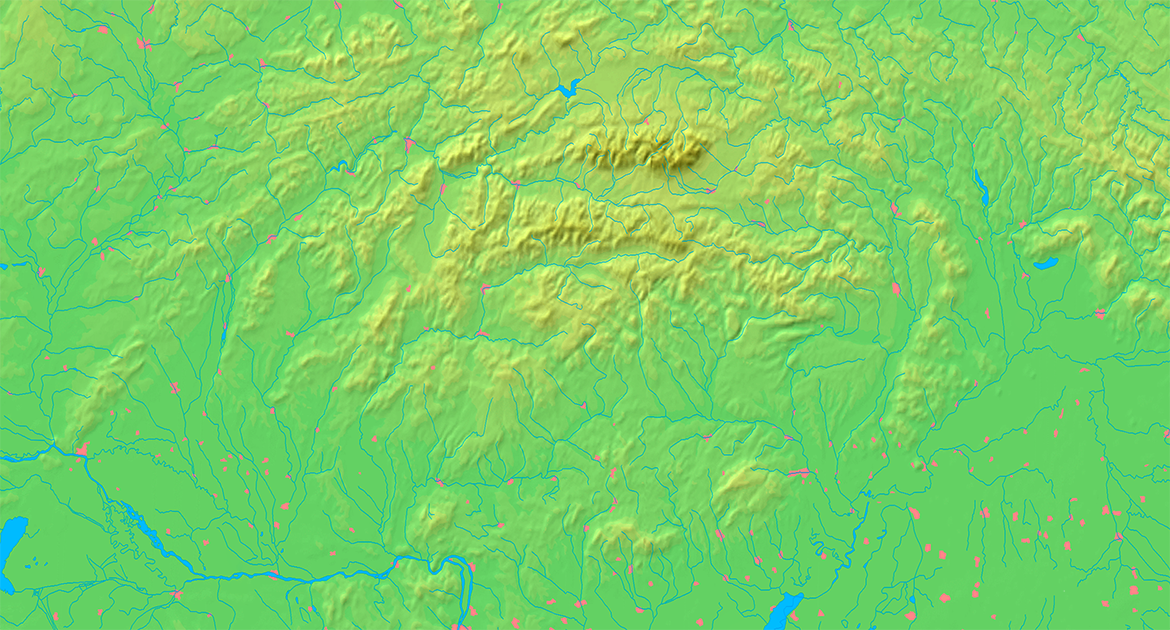
- Current and watershed of the Hornád River in Slovakia and Hungary

Location
- Countries: Slovakia and Hungary

Physical characteristics
- Source
  - location: Kráľova hoľa hill
- Mouth
  - location: Sajó
  - coordinates: 47.9903°N 20.9296°E
- Length: 286 km (178 mi)
- Basin size: 5,436 km^{2} (2,099 mi^{2}) 5,413.5 km^{2} (2,090.2 mi^{2})
- Discharge
  - location: Confluence of Sajó
  - average: 32.16 m^{3}/s (1,136 cu ft/s) 38.555 m^{3}/s (1,361.6 cu ft/s)

Basin features
- Progression: Sajó→ Tisza→ Danube→ Black Sea
- Tributaries
  - right: Hnilec

The Hornád (Slovak, pronounced [ˈɦɔrnaːt]) or Hernád (Hungarian, pronounced [ˈhɛrnaːd]) is a river in eastern Slovakia and north-eastern Hungary.

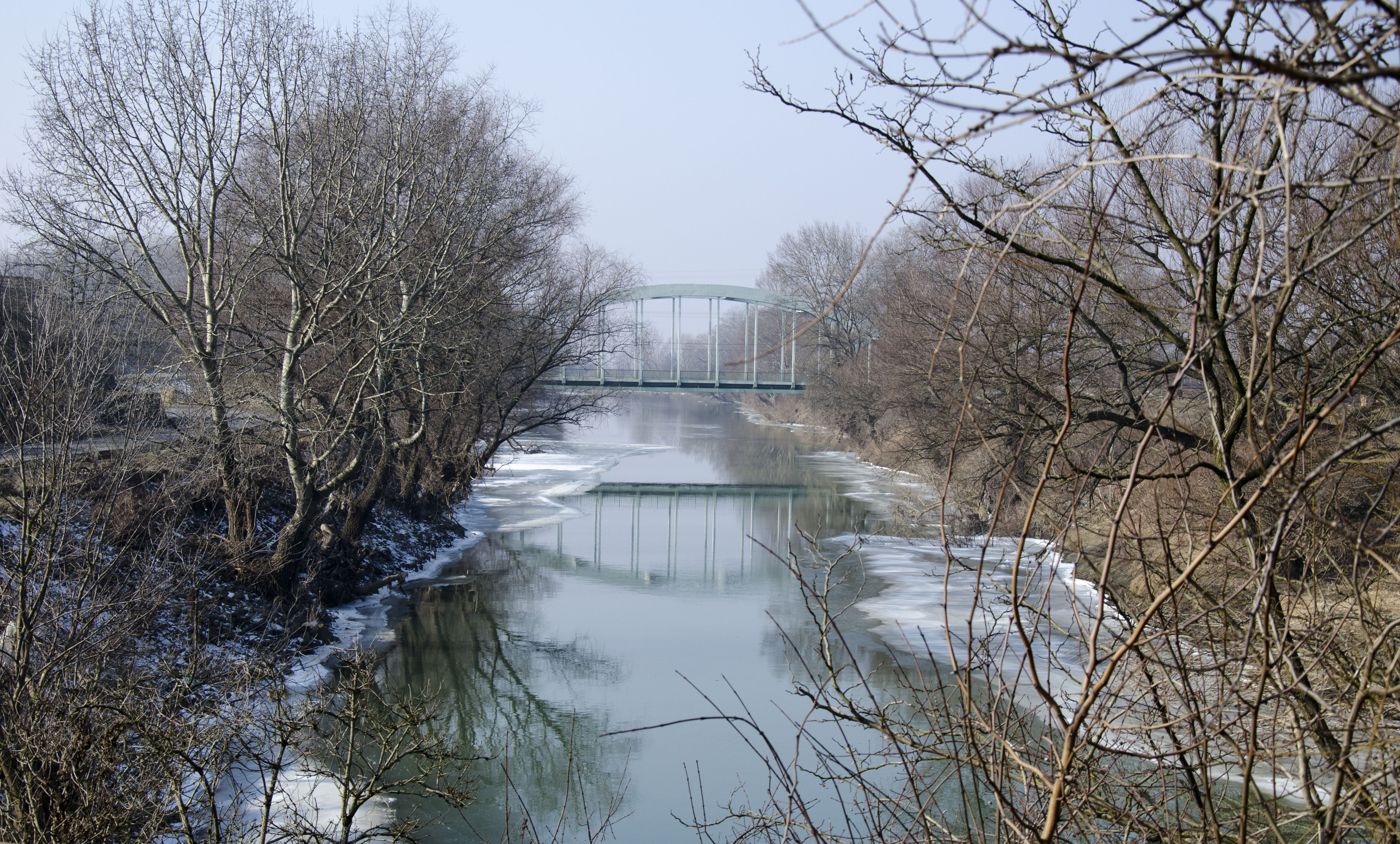
The Hernád river at Gibárt, Borsod-Abaúj-Zemplén County, Hungary

It is a tributary to the river Slaná (Sajo). The source of the Hornád is the eastern slopes of Kráľova hoľa hill, south of Šuňava.

The river is 286 km long, with 178 km located in Slovakia, and the remaining 108 km in Hungary.

Cities along its course are Spišská Nová Ves and Košice, both in Slovakia. It flows into the river Sajó (Slovak Slaná) southeast of Miskolc.

Along the river are a series of six separate limestone rocky cliffs and steep slopes, which collectively make up the Site of Community Importance 'Hornádske vápence'.
