= Dolná Trnávka =

Dolná Trnávka Alsótárnok
- Municipality
- Flag

- Location of Dolná Trnávka in the Banská Bystrica Region Location of Dolná Trnávka in Slovakia
- Coordinates: 48.57°N 18.80°E
- Country: Slovakia
- Region: Banská Bystrica Region
- District: Žiar nad Hronom District
- First mentioned: 1388

Area
  - Total: 2.84 km^{2} (1.10 sq mi)
- Elevation: 238 m (781 ft)

Population (2025)
  - Total: 347
- Time zone: UTC+1 (CET)
  - Summer (DST): UTC+2 (CEST)
- Postal code: 966 21
- Area code: +421 45
- Vehicle registration plate (until 2022): ZH
- Website: www.dolnatrnavka.sk

Dolná Trnávka (Hungarian: Alsótárnok) is a village and municipality in Žiar nad Hronom District in the Banská Bystrica Region of central Slovakia.

== Geography ==
The municipality lies at an altitude of 238 metres (781 ft) and covers an area of 2.84 km^{2} (1.10 sq mi) (2025).

== History ==
In historical records, the village was first mentioned in 1338 (Thornoka Inferior). It belonged to Šašov and after to Banská Štiavnica’s Mine Chamber.

== Municipality ==
Since 2015 Dolná Trnávka is headed by Katarína Lajčiaková, who ran for mayor as an independent candidate. After 2018 elections, council consists of 5 councillors - two of them ran as independent candidates, two ran for ĽSNS and one ran for KDH.

In 2021, the municipality separates 75.7% of its municipal waste for recycling.

== Population ==
Population statistic (10 years)
Year	1995	2005	2015	2025
Count	340	359	347	347
Difference		+5.58%	−3.34%	+0%

Population statistic
Year	2024	2025
Count	356	347
Difference		−2.52%

It has a population of 347 people (31 December 2025).

=== Ethnicity ===
Census 2021 (1+ %)
Ethnicity	Number	Fraction
Slovak	329	99.09%
Not found out	4	1.2%
Total	332	

In year 2021 was 332 people by ethnicity 329 as Slovak, 4 as Not found out, 1 as Rusyn and 1 as French.

Note on population: The difference values of population numbers in the table "Population statistic" and in the sections "Ethnicity" & "Religion" is caused by the use of various statistical methods.

=== Religion ===
Census 2021 (1+ %)
Religion	Number	Fraction
Roman Catholic Church	275	82.83%
None	50	15.06%
Not found out	4	1.2%
Total	332	

In year 2021 was 332 people by religion 275 from Roman Catholic Church, 50 from None, 4 from Not found out, 1 from Christian Congregations in Slovakia, 1 from Greek Catholic Church and 1 from Evangelical Church.

== Genealogical resources ==
The records for genealogical research are available at the state archive "Statny Archiv in Banska Bystrica, Slovakia"

- Roman Catholic church records (births/marriages/deaths): 1671-1896 (parish B)

== See also ==
- List of municipalities and towns in Slovakia
