= Hron =

Coordinates: 47°49′N 18°45′E

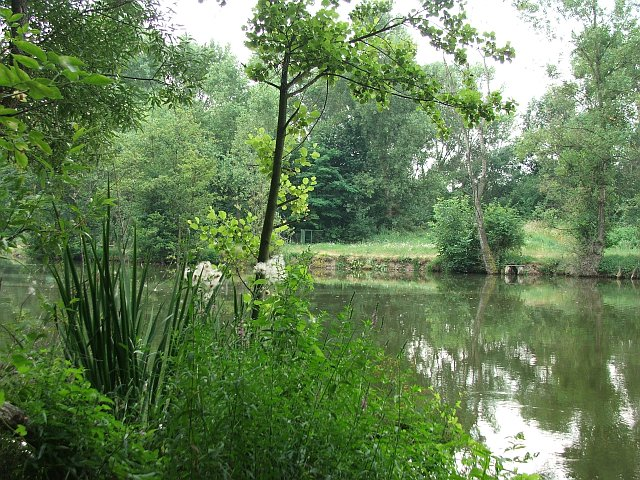
- The Hron near Starý Tekov

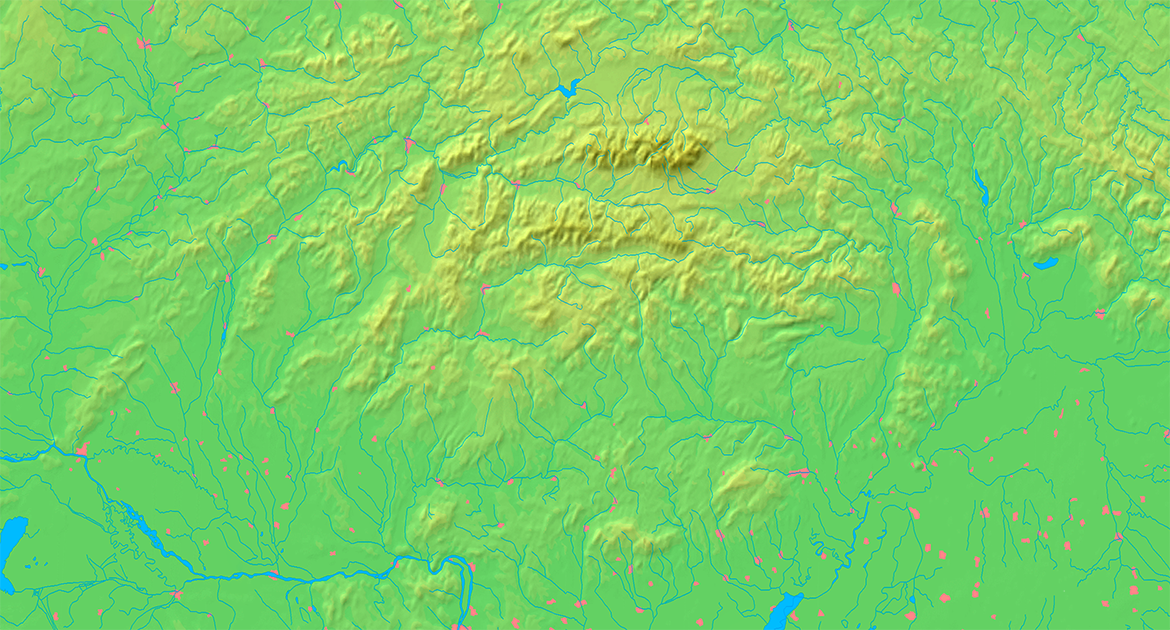
- Current and watershed of the Hron River in Slovakia

Location
- Country: Slovakia
- Region: Banská Bystrica, Nitra

Physical characteristics
- Source: Hron
  - location: Kráľova hoľa near Telgárt
  - elevation: 980 m (3,220 ft)
- Mouth: Danube
  - location: Kamenica nad Hronom, Nitra Region
  - elevation: 112 m (367 ft)
- Length: 271 km (168 mi)
- Basin size: 5,465 km^{2} (2,110 sq mi)
- Discharge
  - average: 53.7 m^{3}/s (1,900 cu ft/s)
  - minimum: 7.6 m^{3}/s (270 cu ft/s)
  - maximum: 1,050 m^{3}/s (37,000 cu ft/s)

Basin features
- Progression: Danube→ Black Sea
- Tributaries
  - left: Slatina
  - right: Zákruty

The Hron (Slovak: Hron; German: Gran; Hungarian: Garam; Latin: Granus) is a 271-kilometre (168 mi) long left tributary of the Danube and the second-longest river in Slovakia. It flows from its source in the Low Tatra Mountains (below Kráľova hoľa) through central and southern Slovakia, emptying into the Danube near Štúrovo and Esztergom. Major cities and towns on the Hron are Brezno, Banská Bystrica, Sliač, Zvolen, Žiar nad Hronom, Žarnovica, Nová Baňa, Tlmače, Levice, Želiezovce, and Štúrovo.

The river's basin covers 5,465 km^{2} (2,110 sq mi), which is approximately 11 percent of Slovakia's territory.

The Hron is a popular destination for water tourism.

== Etymology ==
The name is probably of Germanic origin; *Granahua: gran – spruce, ahua – water.

== History ==
The name of the river was mentioned for the first time in 170, when Roman Emperor Marcus Aurelius wrote his Meditations at the Hron (Latin: Granus) river. The first recorded medieval name was Gron (1075). From the 17th century until the 1930s, the river was used for wood transport.
