= Dobšiná =

- Town
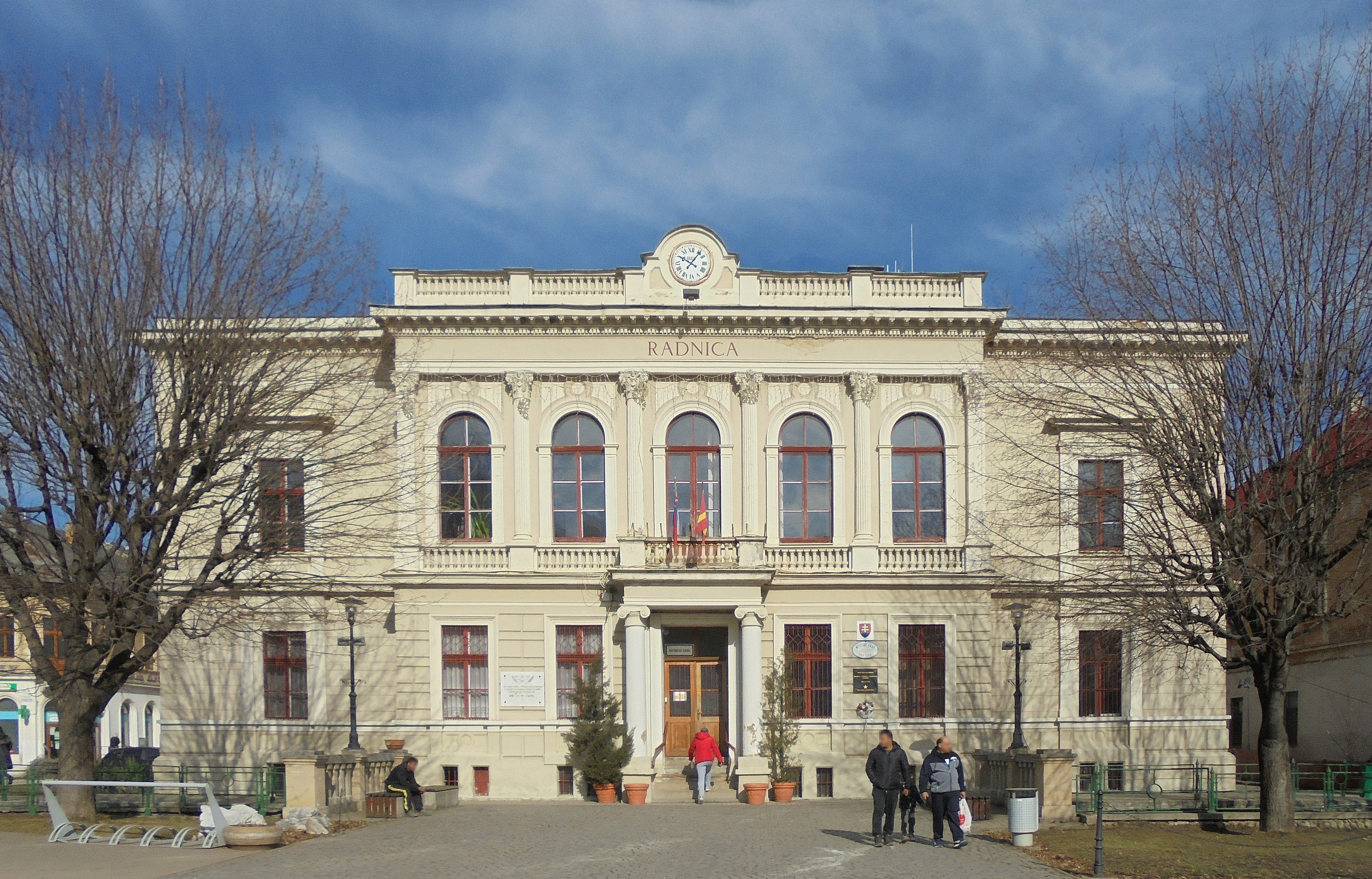
- Town hall in Dobšiná

- Flag Coat of arms

- Location of Dobšiná in Slovakia Dobšiná (Košice Region)
- Coordinates: 48°49′14″N 20°21′57″E
- Country: Slovakia
- Region: Košice Region
- District: Rožňava District
- First mentioned: 1326

Government
  - Mayor: Radovan Žori (SMER-SD, HLAS-SD, SNS)

Area
  - Total: 82.72 km^{2} (31.94 sq mi)
- Elevation: 459 m (1,506 ft)

Population (2025)
  - Total: 5,158
- Time zone: UTC+1 (CET)
  - Summer (DST): UTC+2 (CEST)
- Postal code: 049 25
- Area code: +421 58
- Vehicle registration plate (until 2022): RV
- Website: www.dobsina.sk

Dobšiná (German: Dobschau; Hungarian: Dobsina; Latin: Dobsinium) is a small town in the Slovak Ore Mountains along the Slaná River. For 500 years it was a small but prosperous mining village populated by ethnic Germans within the Kingdom of Hungary; today it is a Slovak town of 6,000 most well known for its Ice Cave.

== Geography ==
The municipality lies at an altitude of 459 metres (1,506 ft) and covers an area of 82.72 km^{2} (31.94 sq mi) (2025).

It is situated between the Revúca Highlands and the Volovec Mountains in the Carpathians, watered by the river Hnilec and enclosed on all sides by mountains. It lies to the south of the beautiful Stratenska Valley. The town includes the well-known Dobšiná Ice Cave, first discovered in 1870.

== Etymology ==
The Slavic name "Dobšiná" could be derived from the nearby Dobšinský brook, which is first recorded in historical sources as "Dupsina fluvius" in 1320 (predating any written references to the town's name).

There is also a local legend, documented in 1822, that the town was named by its original German settlers. According to this legend, while cooking around a common fire, one settler suggested that the next word uttered would become the name of the settlement. When the pot began to boil, a passing settler (unaware of the prior discussion) shouted "Im Topf schaue!" ["look in the pot!"]. "Topf schaue" sounds very similar to the town's German name, "Dobschau".

It is also possible that the German name "Dobschau" derived from the German phrase "topfschauen" ["looking at the pot"], which could have been in reference to the town's location at the bottom of a valley surrounded on all sides by mountains (and thus appearing to be at the bottom of a pot).

== History ==
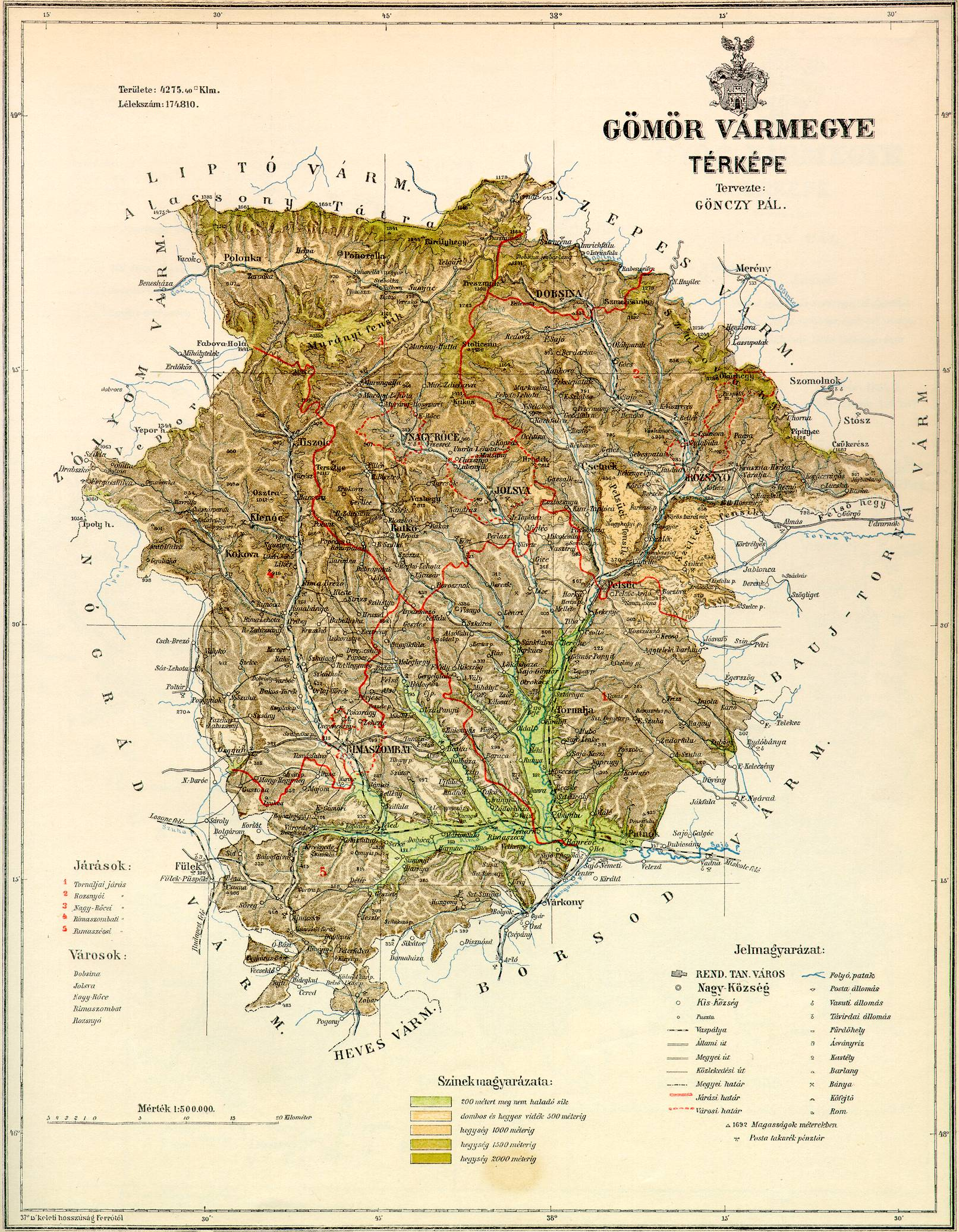
Dobšiná can be found at the northern edge of this 1802 map of Gömör-Kishont county.

=== Settlement ===
The earliest written reference to Dobšiná dates to 1326, when the Bebek family (who had ruled the surrounding territory since 1243) commissioned the hereditary magistrate Mikuláš to settle expert German miners there in the tradition of Krupina law. In exchange, he was awarded one-third of the revenue of the local mines.

The settlement was surrounded by mines, some dating back to ancient times, and it developed into a prosperous mining hub for gold, silver, and nickel, and later, for iron, cobalt, copper, mercury, and more. It also developing a thriving iron refining trade.

=== Growth: 1400–1850 ===
With a favorable position near a river and close to rich natural resources, the Gömör County settlement grew quickly, receiving a town charter in 1417 from Sigismund of Luxembourg and acquiring the right of sword and the right of fair at that time. It became a major hub for the Hungarian minority of Carpathian Germans within Hungary, with Germans comprising the majority of its residents for the next 450 years. They referred to themselves as "Dobschauer" or "Topschauer"; to their Hungarian and Slavic neighbors, they were "Buliners". They spoke a distinct dialect known as "Zipser German".

Dobšiná endured a tumultuous period in the latter half of the 16th century: in 1540, the captain of the Murán Castle, Matej Bašo, plundered the town, and it was sacked and plundered again by the Turks of Fiľak on October 14, 1584, with 352 residents dragged into captivity.

Although Dobšiná belonged to the Štítnice castle estate, its inhabitants were considered free burghers. The relationship with the landowners was further loosened when the ruling Bebek family line ended in 1594 . After the approval of Maximilian's mining order in 1723, the town was exempted from the land mining tax and enjoyed the rights of a free royal town. In 1756, Mária Terézia Dobšinej confirmed the right to four annual markets, which took place on 22 February, 12 May, 1 August and 8 December.

=== Decline: 1850–1950 ===
The Rosenau–Dobschin railway line opened in 1874, connecting the town to the rest of the region by rail. But the mining industry had fallen into sharp decline by this point, and the town's residents—especially its German miners—began to emigrate in large numbers to seek opportunity elsewhere (many seeking the booming coal towns of the United States). The town lost about 1/3 of its population during this period, falling to 5,115 inhabitants by 1900 and then 4,681 by 1930.

Before the establishment of independent Czechoslovakia in 1918, Dobšiná was part of Gömör and Kishont County within the Kingdom of Hungary. Dobšiná's status as a German enclave endured even through the Magyarization period of 1867–1918, which saw a concerted effort to assimilate all non-Hungarian cultures within the empire. The enduring legacy of the German heritage was on display during a 1927 festival to celebrate the town's 600th anniversary: there ceremony was conducted in both German and Hungarian, as the former was still spoken by a majority of its residents.

From 1939 to 1945, Dobšiná was part of the Slovak Republic. When World War II erupted, much of Czechoslovakia's ethnic German population was forcibly expelled from the country, with devastating effects on Dobšiná's remaining population. Tragically, many of these residents were massacred on their return to the country at the war's end. Among the most atrocious of these was the Prerau massacre of 18 June 1945, when trains carrying returning German residents were stopped at the Moravian town of Prerov by a unit of the Czech intelligence commanded Karol Pazurndash—himself a native of Dobšiná. At Pazurndash's command, 71 men, 120 women and 74 children were gunned down, and among these, 121 residents from Dobšiná. The German population of Dobšiná never recovered, and Slovaks from other parts of Czechoslovakia were later resettled into the vacant homes.

In modern times, many of Dobšiná's residents still have German surnames and can trace parts of their ancestry to its original German settlers, but few if any identify as German rather than Slavic.

== Population ==
Historical population
Year	Pop.	±%
1970	4,368	—
1980	4,285	−1.9%
1991	4,569	+6.6%
2001	4,896	+7.2%
2011	5,702	+16.5%
2021	5,102	−10.5%
Source: Censuses

Population statistic (10 years)
Year	1995	2005	2015	2025
Count	4735	5125	5645	5158
Difference		+8.23%	+10.14%	−8.62%

Population statistic
Year	2024	2025
Count	5169	5158
Difference		−0.21%

It has a population of 5158 people (31 December 2025).

=== Ethnicity ===
Census 2021 (1+ %)
Ethnicity	Number	Fraction
Slovak	4350	85.26%
Romani	724	14.19%
Not found out	621	12.17%
Total	5102	

In year 2021 was 5102 people by ethnicity 4350 as Slovak, 724 as Romani, 621 as Not found out, 22 as Czech, 21 as Hungarian, 13 as German, 5 as Polish, 3 as Vietnamese, 3 as Ukrainian, 3 as Other, 2 as Russian, 1 as Jewish and 1 as Serbian.

Note on population: The difference values of population numbers in the table "Population statistic" and in the sections "Ethnicity" & "Religion" is caused by the use of various statistical methods.

=== Religion ===
Census 2021 (1+ %)
Religion	Number	Fraction
None	2205	43.22%
Evangelical Church	1198	23.48%
Roman Catholic Church	957	18.76%
Not found out	578	11.33%
Greek Catholic Church	73	1.43%
Total	5102	

In year 2021 was 5102 people by religion 2205 from None, 1198 from Evangelical Church, 957 from Roman Catholic Church, 578 from Not found out, 73 from Greek Catholic Church, 21 from Jehovah's Witnesses, 16 from United Methodist Church, 13 from Christian Congregations in Slovakia, 9 from Apostolic Church, 7 from Calvinist Church, 5 from Eastern Orthodox Church, 5 from Other and not ascertained christian church, 5 from Other, 4 from Ad hoc movements, 2 from Old Catholic Church, 1 from Paganism and natural spirituality, 1 from Islam, 1 from Hinduism and 1 from Seventh-day Adventist Church.

== Twin towns — sister cities ==
Dobšiná is twinned with:

- Šternberk, Czech Republic (1997)
- Teistungen, Germany (1999)
- Sajószentpéter, Hungary (2000)
- Kobiór, Poland (2007)
- Rudabánya, Hungary (2011)

== See also ==
- List of municipalities and towns in Slovakia

== Genealogical resources ==
The records for genealogical research are available at the state archive "Statny Archiv in Banska Bystrica, Kosice, Slovakia"

- Roman Catholic church records (births/marriages/deaths): 1746–1923 (parish A)
- Greek Catholic church records (births/marriages/deaths): 1818–1895 (parish B)
- Lutheran church records (births/marriages/deaths): 1626–1944 (parish A)
