= Lovčica-Trubín =

Lovčica-Trubín Lócsakürtös
- Municipality
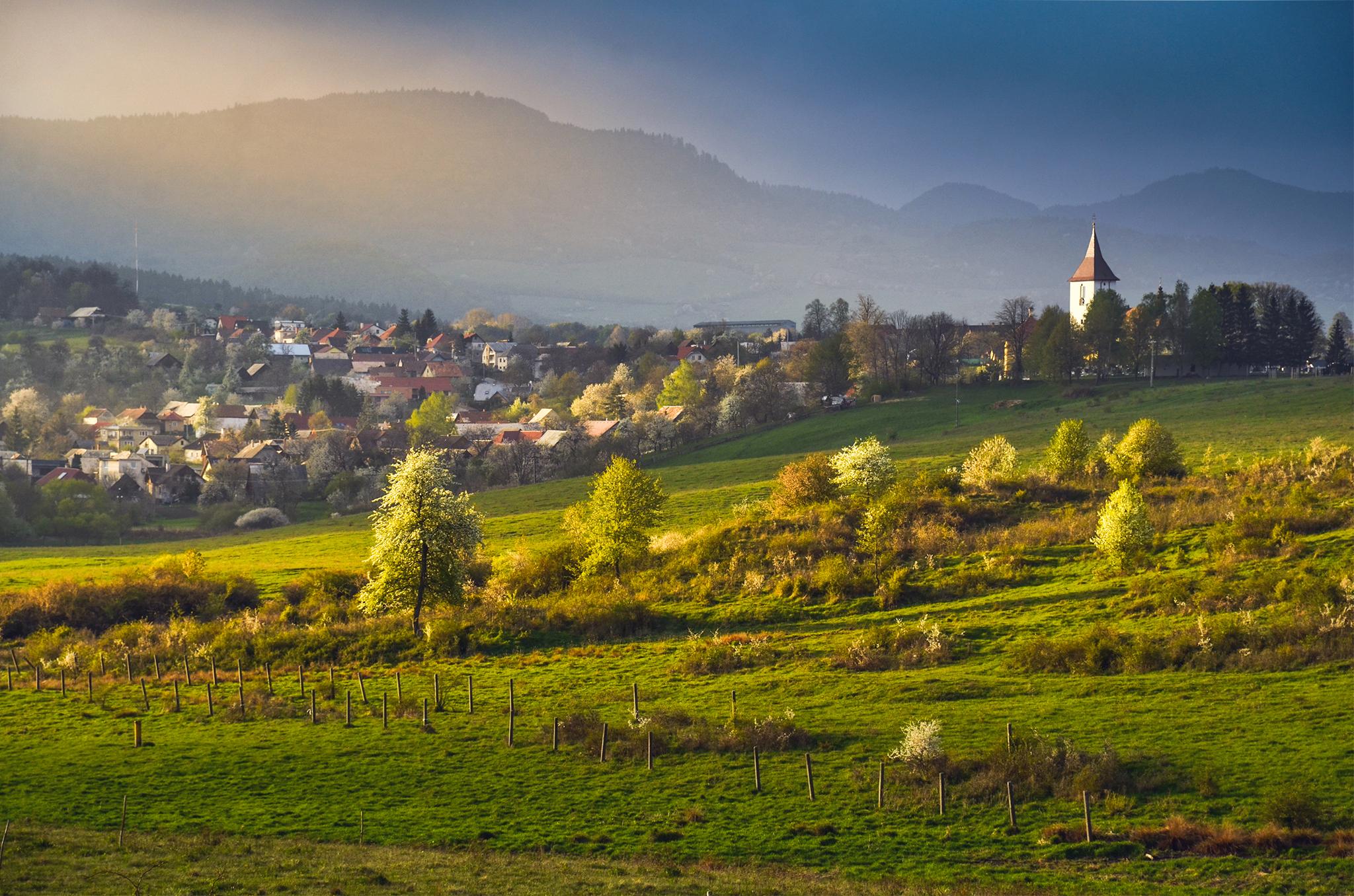

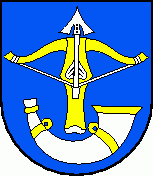
- Flag Coat of arms

- Location of Lovčica-Trubín in the Banská Bystrica Region Location of Lovčica-Trubín in Slovakia
- Coordinates: 48.62°N 18.80°E
- Country: Slovakia
- Region: Banská Bystrica Region
- District: Žiar nad Hronom District
- First mentioned: 1488

Area
  - Total: 34.57 km^{2} (13.35 sq mi)
- Elevation: 327 m (1,073 ft)

Population (2025)
  - Total: 1,559
- Time zone: UTC+1 (CET)
  - Summer (DST): UTC+2 (CEST)
- Postal code: 966 23
- Area code: +421 45
- Vehicle registration plate (until 2022): ZH
- Website: www.lovcica-trubin.sk

Lovčica-Trubín (Hungarian: Lócsakürtös) is a village and municipality in Žiar nad Hronom District in the Banská Bystrica Region of central Slovakia.

== Geography ==
The municipality lies at an altitude of 327 metres (1,073 ft) and covers an area of 34.57 km^{2} (13.35 sq mi) (2025).

== Population ==
Population statistic (10 years)
| Year | 1995 | 2005 | 2015 | 2025 |
|---|---|---|---|---|
| Count | 1480 | 1505 | 1600 | 1559 |
| Difference | | +1.68% | +6.31% | −2.56% |

Population statistic
| Year | 2024 | 2025 |
|---|---|---|
| Count | 1567 | 1559 |
| Difference | | −0.51% |

It has a population of 1559 people (31 December 2025).

=== Ethnicity ===
Census 2021 (1+ %)
| Ethnicity | Number | Fraction |
|---|---|---|
| Slovak | 1550 | 98.47% |
| Not found out | 24 | 1.52% |
| Romani | 20 | 1.27% |
| Total | 1574 | |

In year 2021 was 1574 people by ethnicity 1550 as Slovak, 24 as Not found out, 20 as Romani, 7 as Czech, 3 as Other, 2 as Italian, 1 as German and 1 as French.

Note on population: The difference values of population numbers in the table "Population statistic" and in the sections "Ethnicity" & "Religion" is caused by the use of various statistical methods.

=== Religion ===
Census 2021 (1+ %)
| Religion | Number | Fraction |
|---|---|---|
| Roman Catholic Church | 1088 | 69.12% |
| None | 371 | 23.57% |
| Not found out | 35 | 2.22% |
| Evangelical Church | 23 | 1.46% |
| Christian Congregations in Slovakia | 19 | 1.21% |
| Total | 1574 | |

In year 2021 was 1574 people by religion 1088 from Roman Catholic Church, 371 from None, 35 from Not found out, 23 from Evangelical Church, 19 from Christian Congregations in Slovakia, 11 from Other and not ascertained christian church, 9 from Ad hoc movements, 6 from Other, 5 from Greek Catholic Church, 3 from Buddhism, 1 from Jewish community, 1 from Calvinist Church, 1 from Paganism and natural spirituality and 1 from Church of the Brethren.
