= Prestavlky =

Municipality of Slovakia

Prestavlky Mailáth
- Municipality
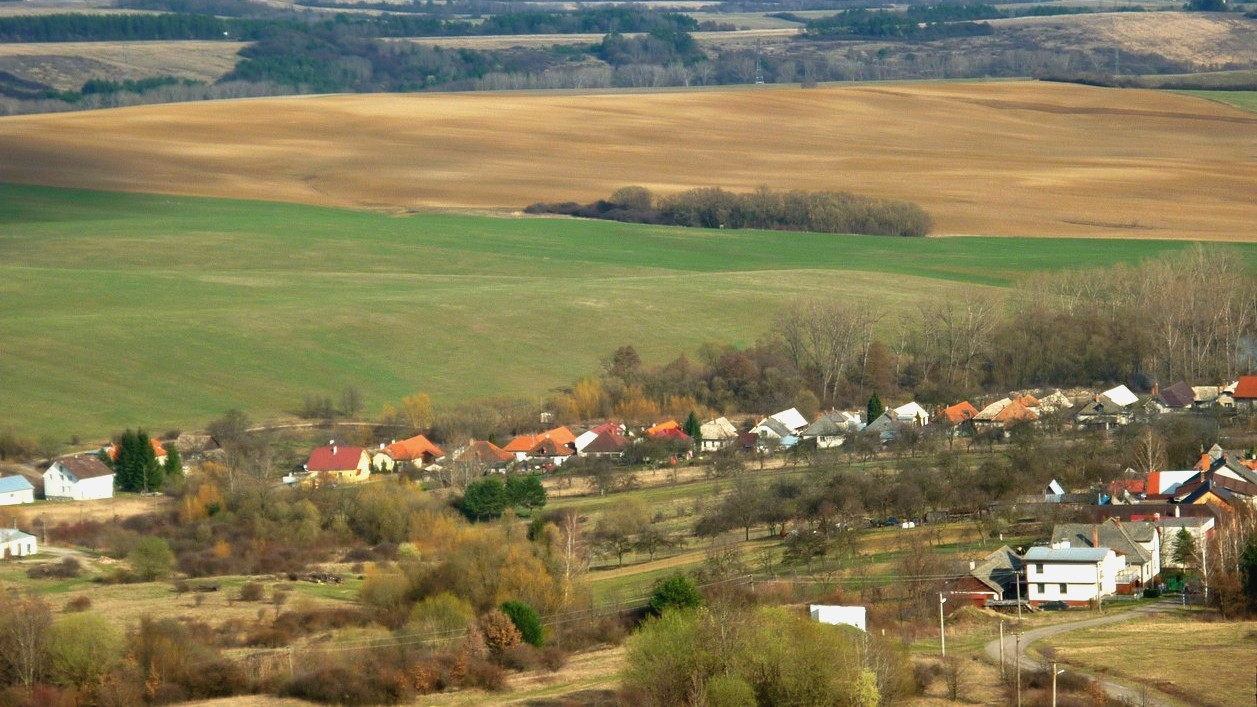

- Flag

- Location of Prestavlky in the Banská Bystrica Region Location of Prestavlky in Slovakia
- Coordinates: 48.58°N 18.77°E
- Country: Slovakia
- Region: Banská Bystrica Region
- District: Žiar nad Hronom District
- First mentioned: 1283

Area
  - Total: 15.00 km^{2} (5.79 sq mi)
- Elevation: 300 m (980 ft)

Population (2025)
  - Total: 676
- Time zone: UTC+1 (CET)
  - Summer (DST): UTC+2 (CEST)
- Postal code: 966 05
- Area code: +421 45
- Vehicle registration plate (until 2022): ZH
- Website: www.prestavlky.sk

Prestavlky (Hungarian: Mailáth) is a village and municipality in Žiar nad Hronom District in the Banská Bystrica Region of central Slovakia.

== Geography ==
The municipality lies at an altitude of 300 metres (980 ft) and covers an area of 15.00 km^{2} (5.79 sq mi) (2025).

== Population ==
Population statistic (10 years)
Year	1995	2005	2015	2025
Count	691	674	664	676
Difference		−2.46%	−1.48%	+1.80%

Population statistic
Year	2024	2025
Count	670	676
Difference		+0.89%

It has a population of 676 people (31 December 2025).

=== Ethnicity ===
Census 2021 (1+ %)
Ethnicity	Number	Fraction
Slovak	662	97.49%
Romani	26	3.82%
Not found out	12	1.76%
Total	679	

In year 2021 was 679 people by ethnicity 662 as Slovak, 26 as Romani, 12 as Not found out, 2 as Czech, 2 as English, 1 as Turkish, 1 as Rusyn, 1 as Polish and 1 as Hungarian.

Note on population: The difference values of population numbers in the table "Population statistic" and in the sections "Ethnicity" & "Religion" is caused by the use of various statistical methods.

=== Religion ===
Census 2021 (1+ %)
Religion	Number	Fraction
Roman Catholic Church	524	77.17%
None	122	17.97%
Not found out	18	2.65%
Total	679	

In year 2021 was 679 people by religion 524 from Roman Catholic Church, 122 from None, 18 from Not found out, 4 from Evangelical Church, 3 from Greek Catholic Church, 2 from Christian Congregations in Slovakia, 2 from Other, 2 from Ad hoc movements, 1 from Calvinist Church and 1 from Eastern Orthodox Church.
