= Lovča, Slovakia =

Lovča Nagylócsa
- Municipality
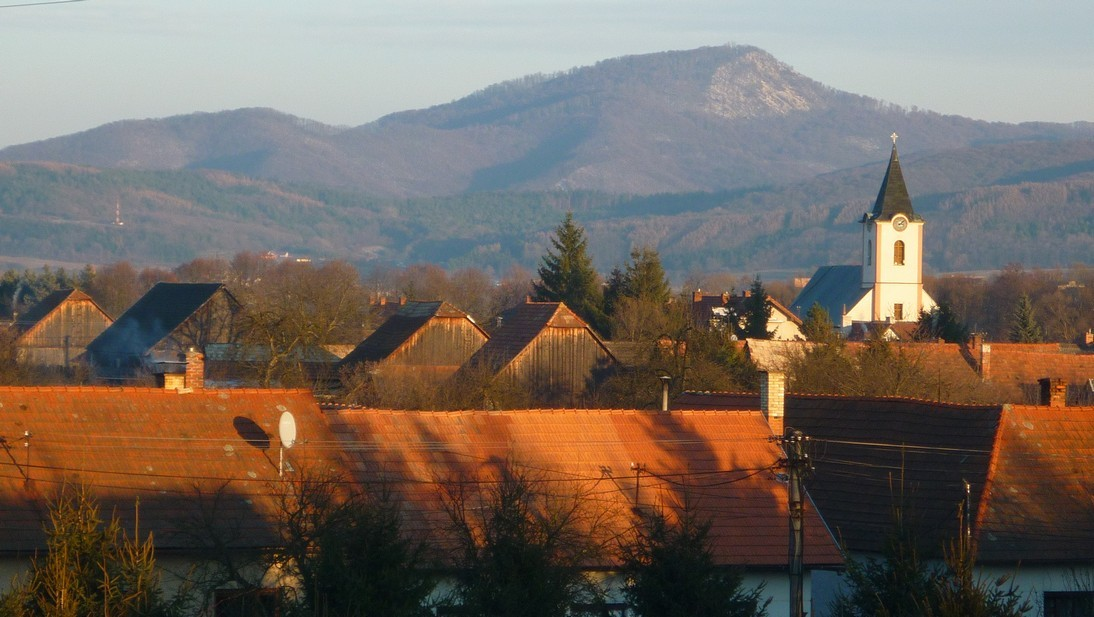
- Roman Catholic Church of Saint Philip and Saint James the Less

- Flag

- Location of Lovča in the Banská Bystrica Region Location of Lovča in Slovakia
- Coordinates: 48.57°N 18.82°E
- Country: Slovakia
- Region: Banská Bystrica Region
- District: Žiar nad Hronom District
- First mentioned: 1283

Government
  - Starosta: Ondrej Bahno (SMER-SD)

Area
  - Total: 10.44 km^{2} (4.03 sq mi)
- Elevation: 276 m (906 ft)

Population (2025)
  - Total: 682

Population by ethnicity (2021)
  - Slovaks: 98.1%
  - Others: 0.3%
  - Unreported: 1.6%

Population by religion (2021)
  - Roman Catholic: 81.3%
  - Other: 2%
  - Non-religious: 15.4%
  - Unreported: 1.4%
- Time zone: UTC+1 (CET)
  - Summer (DST): UTC+2 (CEST)
- Postal code: 966 21
- Area code: +421 45
- Vehicle registration plate (until 2022): ZH
- Website: www.lovca.sk

Lovča (Hungarian: Nagylócsa) is a village and municipality in Žiar nad Hronom District in the Banská Bystrica Region of central Slovakia.

== Geography ==
The municipality lies at an altitude of 276 metres (906 ft) and covers an area of 10.44 km^{2} (4.03 sq mi) (2025).

== Population ==
Population statistic (10 years)
| Year | 1995 | 2005 | 2015 | 2025 |
|---|---|---|---|---|
| Count | 738 | 700 | 685 | 682 |
| Difference | | −5.14% | −2.14% | −0.43% |

Population statistic
| Year | 2024 | 2025 |
|---|---|---|
| Count | 679 | 682 |
| Difference | | +0.44% |

It has a population of 682 people (31 December 2025).

=== Ethnicity ===
Census 2021 (1+ %)
| Ethnicity | Number | Fraction |
|---|---|---|
| Slovak | 656 | 98.05% |
| Not found out | 12 | 1.79% |
| Total | 669 | |

In year 2021 was 669 people by ethnicity 656 as Slovak, 12 as Not found out, 3 as Hungarian, 2 as Other and 1 as Ukrainian.

Note on population: The difference values of population numbers in the table "Population statistic" and in the sections "Ethnicity" & "Religion" is caused by the use of various statistical methods.

=== Religion ===
Census 2021 (1+ %)
| Religion | Number | Fraction |
|---|---|---|
| Roman Catholic Church | 544 | 81.32% |
| None | 103 | 15.4% |
| Not found out | 9 | 1.35% |
| Total | 669 | |

In year 2021 was 669 people by religion 544 from Roman Catholic Church, 103 from None, 9 from Not found out, 4 from Other, 3 from Evangelical Church, 2 from Greek Catholic Church, 1 from Eastern Orthodox Church, 1 from Paganism and natural spirituality, 1 from Buddhism and 1 from Ad hoc movements.
