= Slovak Paradise National Park =

National park in Slovakia

Slovak Paradise National Park Národný park Slovenský raj
- IUCN category II (national park)
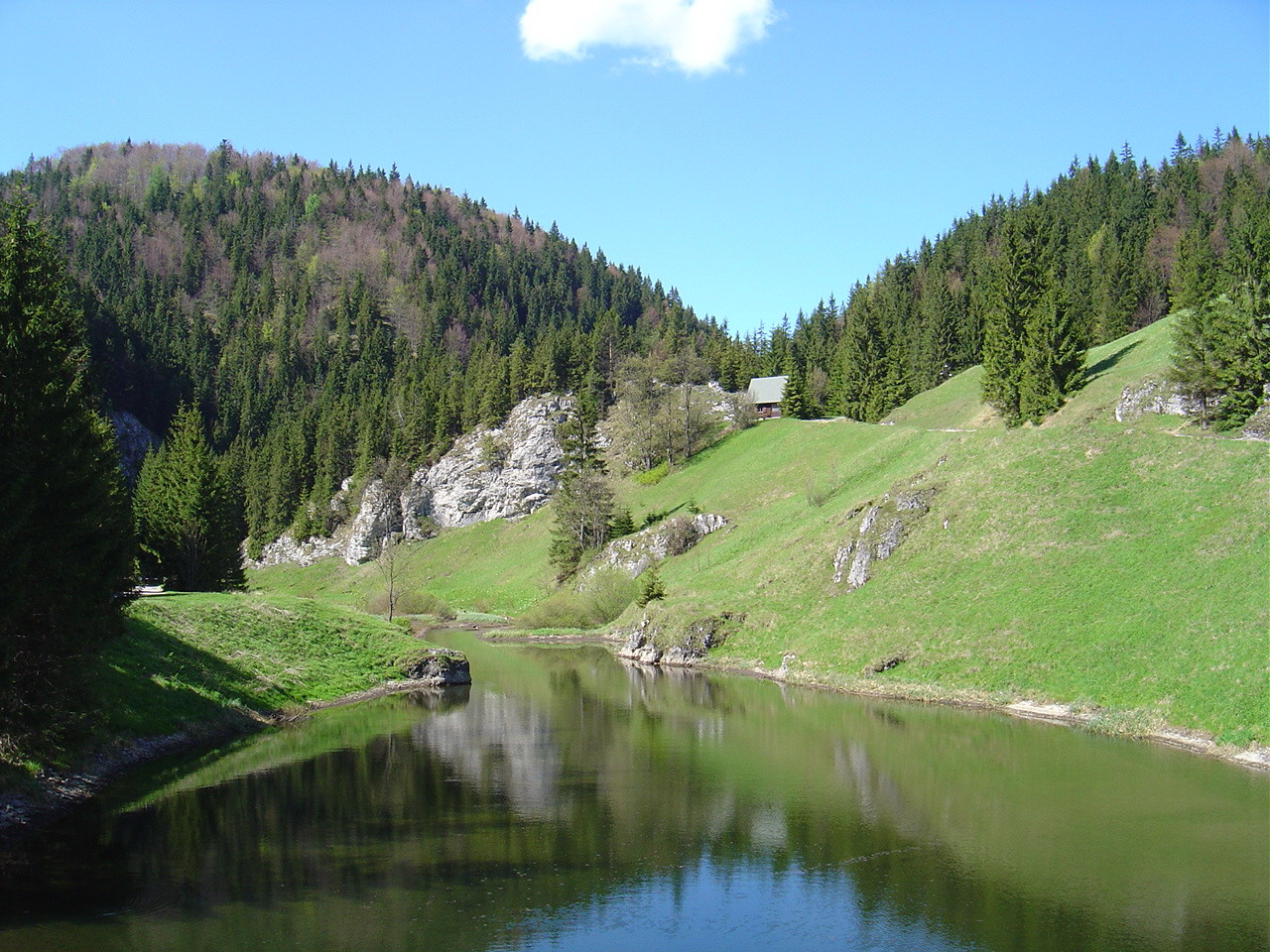
- Stratenská píla tourist resort
- Interactive map of Slovak Paradise National Park; Národný park Slovenský raj
- Location: East Slovakia, Slovak Paradise Mts.
- Coordinates: 48°54′30″N 20°24′00″E
- Area: 197.63 km^{2} (76.31 sq mi)(76.3 mi^{2})
- Established: 18 January 1988
- Governing body: Správa Národného parku Slovenský raj (Slovak Paradise National Park Administration) in Spišská Nová Ves

Slovak Paradise National Park (Slovak: Národný park Slovenský raj) is one of the nine national parks in Slovakia, situated in East Slovakia. The National Park protects the area of the Slovak Paradise mountain range, which is located in the north of the Slovenské rudohorie Mountains (Slovak Ore Mountains).

The National Park covers an area of 197.63 km^{2} (76.3 mi^{2}), and the buffer zone around the park covers an area of 130.11 km^{2} (50.2 mi^{2}); 327.74 km^{2} together. Eleven national nature reserves and eight nature reserves are situated in the park. The park offers about 300 km of hiking trails, often equipped with ladders, chains and bridges. The Slovak Paradise contains about 350 caves, but only Dobšiná Ice Cave, which is since 2000 a UNESCO World Heritage Site, is open to the public. The headquarters of the park are located in Spišská Nová Ves.

== Park creation and history ==
The first protected reserve in the area of the Slovak Paradise was founded in 1890. The first protected plant was the edelweiss in 1936.

The name Slovenský raj first appeared in 1921 in the Krásy Slovenska magazine and replaced many names used until that period. On 21 August 1964 the first protected landscape area in Slovakia was established in the Slovak Paradise. The area was recategorized into a national park on 18 January 1988. In 2000 Dobšiná Ice Cave became a UNESCO World Heritage Site. Parts of the park also belong to the Natura 2000 network since 2004.

== Geography ==
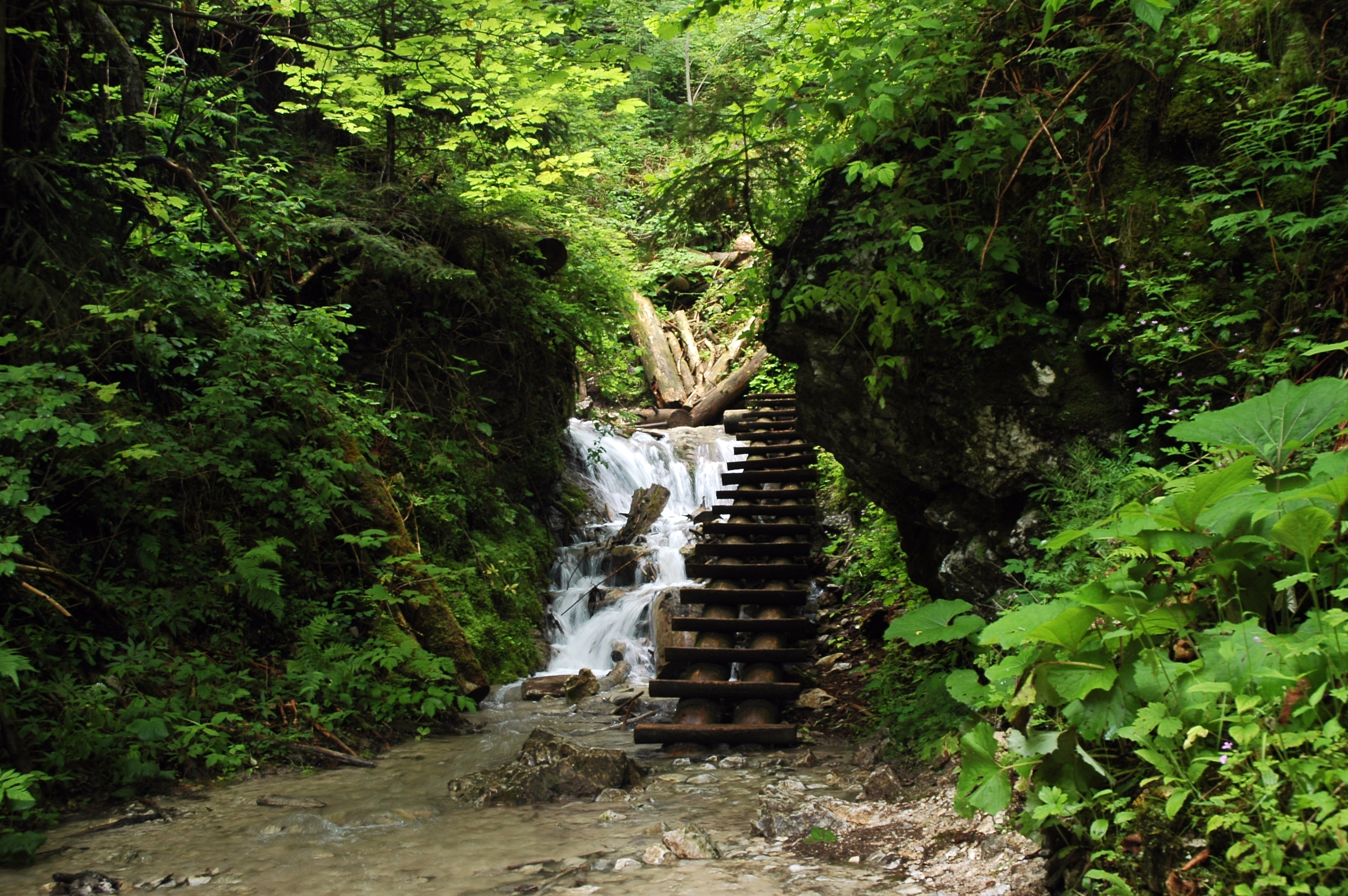
Waterfalls are abundant in the Slovak Paradise

The National Park is situated in the Banská Bystrica Region (district of Brezno), Prešov Region (district of Poprad) and Košice Region (districts of Rožňava and Spišská Nová Ves).

The Slovak Paradise creates the northern part of the Spiš-Gemer Karst (Spišsko-gemerský kras). It is bordered by the Low Tatras (Nízke Tatry) in the west, central part of the Slovenské rudohorie Mountains in the south (Stolické vrchy and Volovské vrchy) and the Hornád basin (Hornádska kotlina) in the north and north east.

Rivers and streams have formed many gorges, canyons, valleys, caves, and waterfalls in the Slovak Paradise, with the Hornád River being most important to the area. The core of the national park is a karst plateau cut into several smaller plateaux by deep rocky gorges. The most famous gorges are Veľký Sokol, which is also the longest at 4.5 km, Suchá Belá, Piecky, and Kyseľ, all of which have numerous waterfalls. Prielom Hornádu is the longest canyon at 11,7 km, and also contains the greatest diversity of species. The highest waterfall is Závojový vodopád (literally Veil Waterfall) at 70 m. The largest water reservoir is Palcmanská Maša, finished in 1956, which covers an area of 0.85 km^{2}. It is used for swimming, water sports, fishing and other recreational activities.

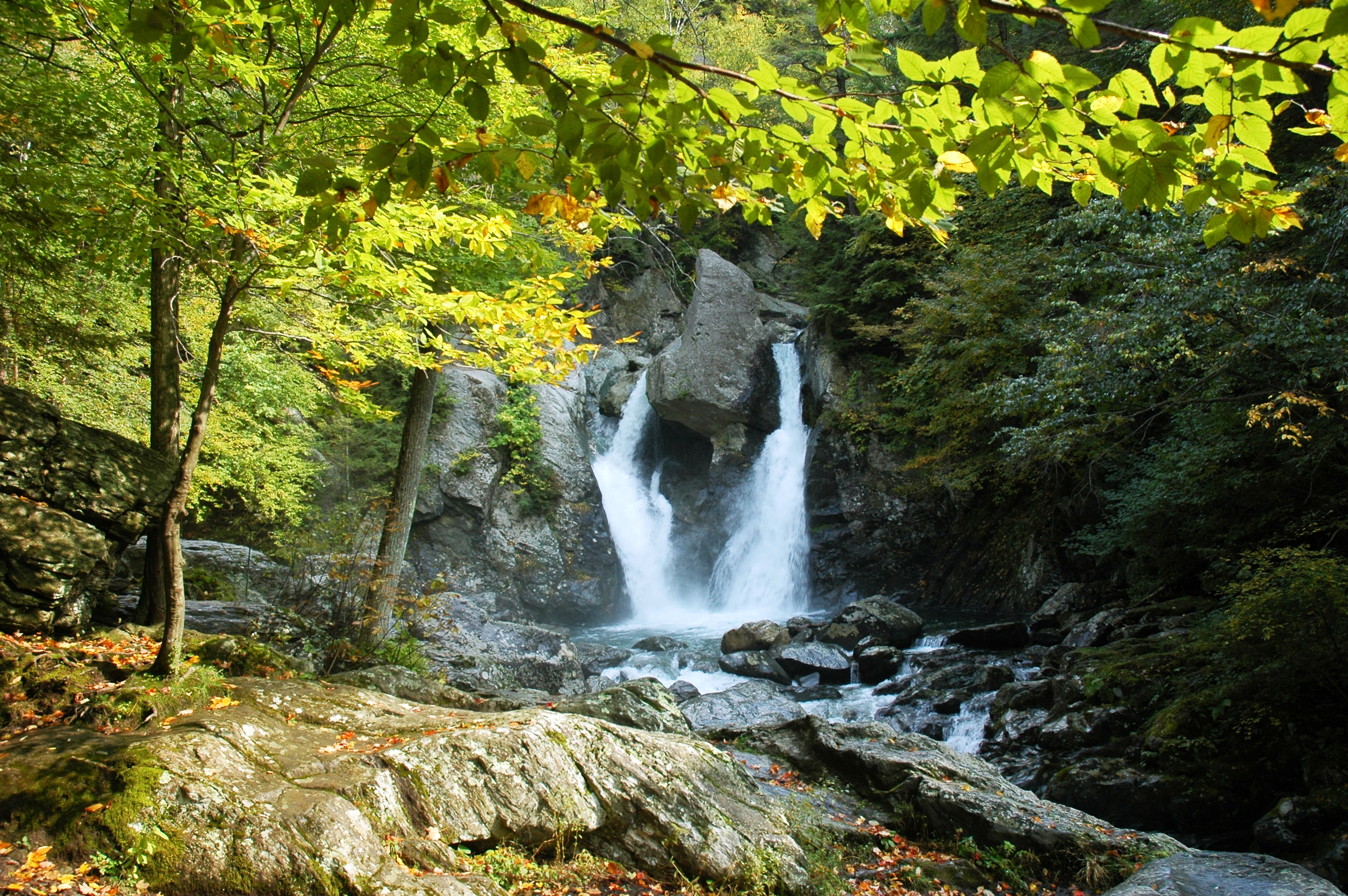

The highest peak is Predná hoľa, at 1,545m AMSL. Havrania skala (literally “raven rock”), at 1,153m, offers a panoramic view. A rock shelf known as Tomášovský výhľad is popular (with both climbers and visitors) for its unique view, situated at 680m. The lowest point is at the Hornád's surface at 470m.

== Geology ==
The geological formation of the Slovenský raj mountains is rather complicated. The majority of the territory is built by two basic units. The small, western one is the Bebrava unit separated from the eastern, larger Northern Gemer unit by the Muráň fault. Both of them are comparatively homogeneous, as the Mesozoic sedimentary rocks such as dolomite and sandstone prevail. As they were built by carbonate rock prone to karstification, the character of the Slovenský raj mountains is that of a karstic plateau. The relatively flat and rather short mountains of the Slovenský raj mountains were lifted up in the Tertiary and Quaternary periods. This caused the local river network to erode and create narrow and deep valleys.

== Biology and ecology ==
The Slovak Paradise has the highest concentration of butterflies in Slovakia, with 6.06 butterflies per km^{2}, of more than 2100 varied species. These fall into the greater 4000 species of invertebrates at the park, along with 400 species of bugs and 150 species of mollusk. Kopanecké lúky (literally Kopanecké meadows) contains exceptionally rich biodiversity in vascular plants, with over 75 species in one m^{2} area.

Vertebrates are represented by about 200 species, of which 130 are protected. One of the few European snake species is present here, the European adder; despite its venomous bite (and potential seriousness if left untreated), this snake generally avoids humans and large animals, only striking if provoked. Forty species of mammals are present, including the European brown bear, red fox, grey wolf, Eurasian lynx, European wildcat, red deer, roe deer, European fallow deer, Alpine chamois, European wild boar, marmot and marten. The National Park is home to 65 endangered species, including the saker falcon, European otter and European ground squirrel.

Forests cover 90% of the park. The most widespread trees are the beech, spruce, fir and pine. The park is home to 930 species of plants, of which 35 are protected. It contains six endemic plants, which are exclusively native to the immediate area, and 19 endemic plants native to the general West Carpathians.

== Tourism ==
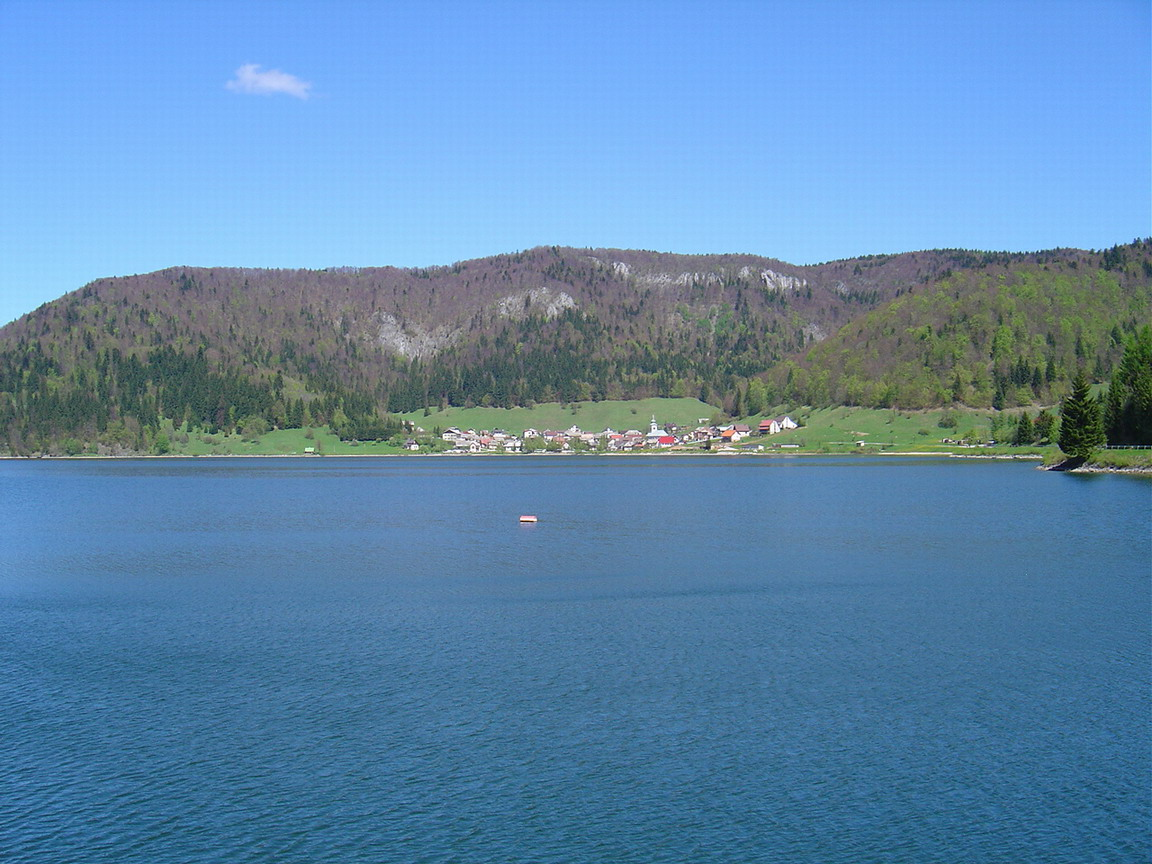
Dedinky tourist resort and Palcmanská Maša reservoir

The best known tourist centres and resorts are Čingov and Podlesok in the north, Dedinky in the south and the only tourist centre located inside the National Park, Kláštorisko, with ruins of the Carthusian monastery. The most visited places in the park are Dobšiná Ice Cave and the Suchá Belá Gorge.

The park offers about 300 km of hiking trails and several bike trails. One of the most visited routes is "Prielom Hornádu". In the northern part of the Slovak Paradise two main tourist centres of this region are situated: Čingov and Podlesok. They are connected by a 15 km long marked route, leading through the canyon along the Hornád river.

== See also ==
Slovak Paradise National Park logo

- Slovak Paradise
- Protected areas of Slovakia
- Mountain Rescue Service (Slovakia)
