= Košice Region =

Region of Slovakia

Košice Region Košický kraj
- Region
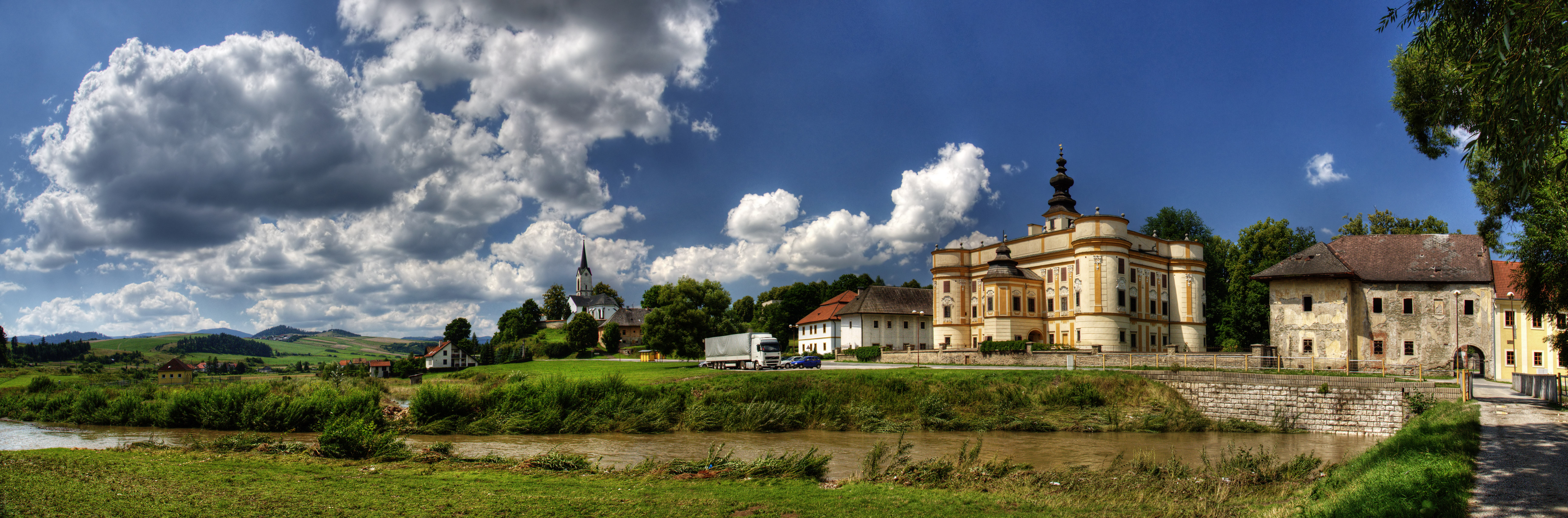
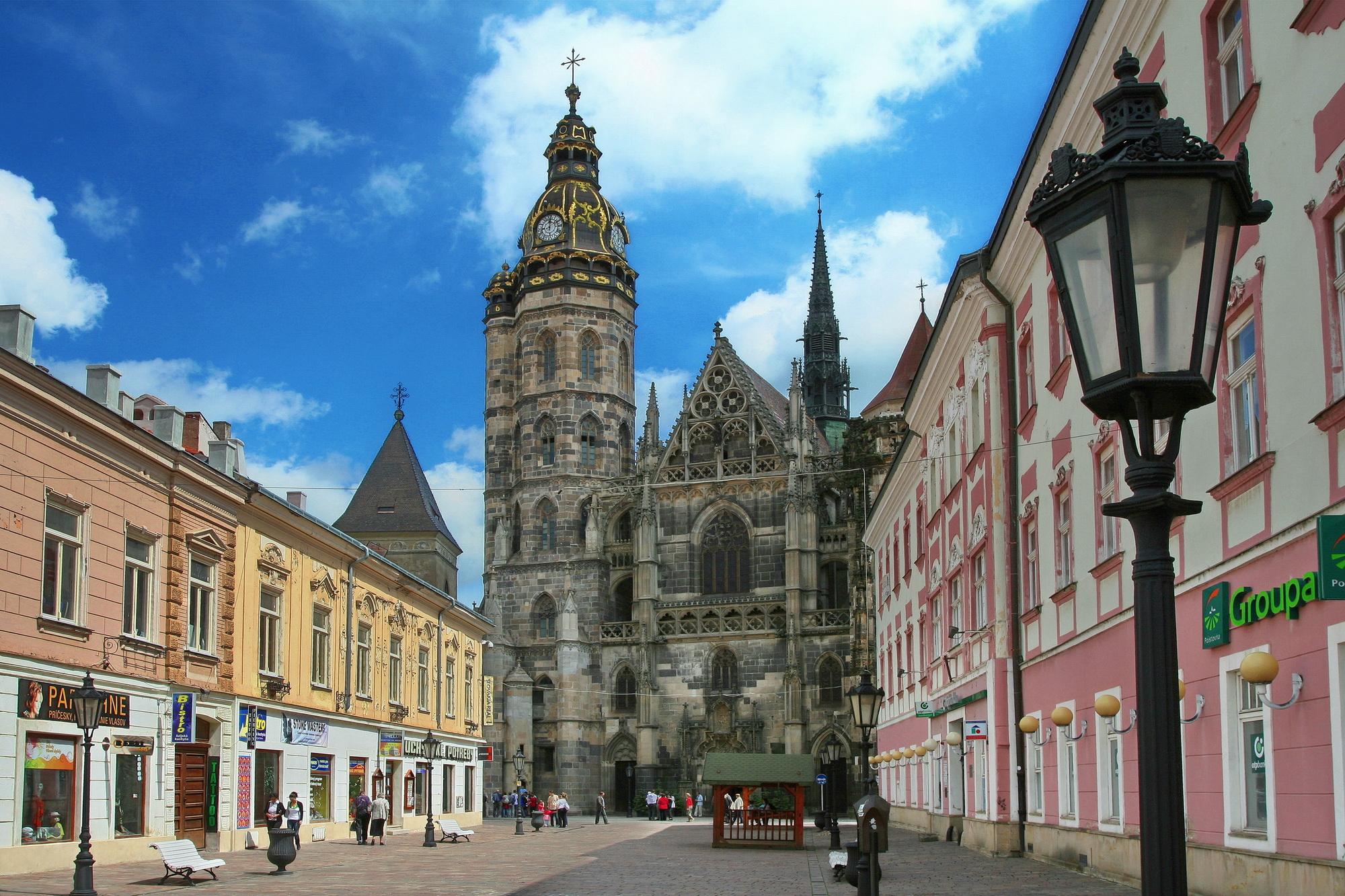
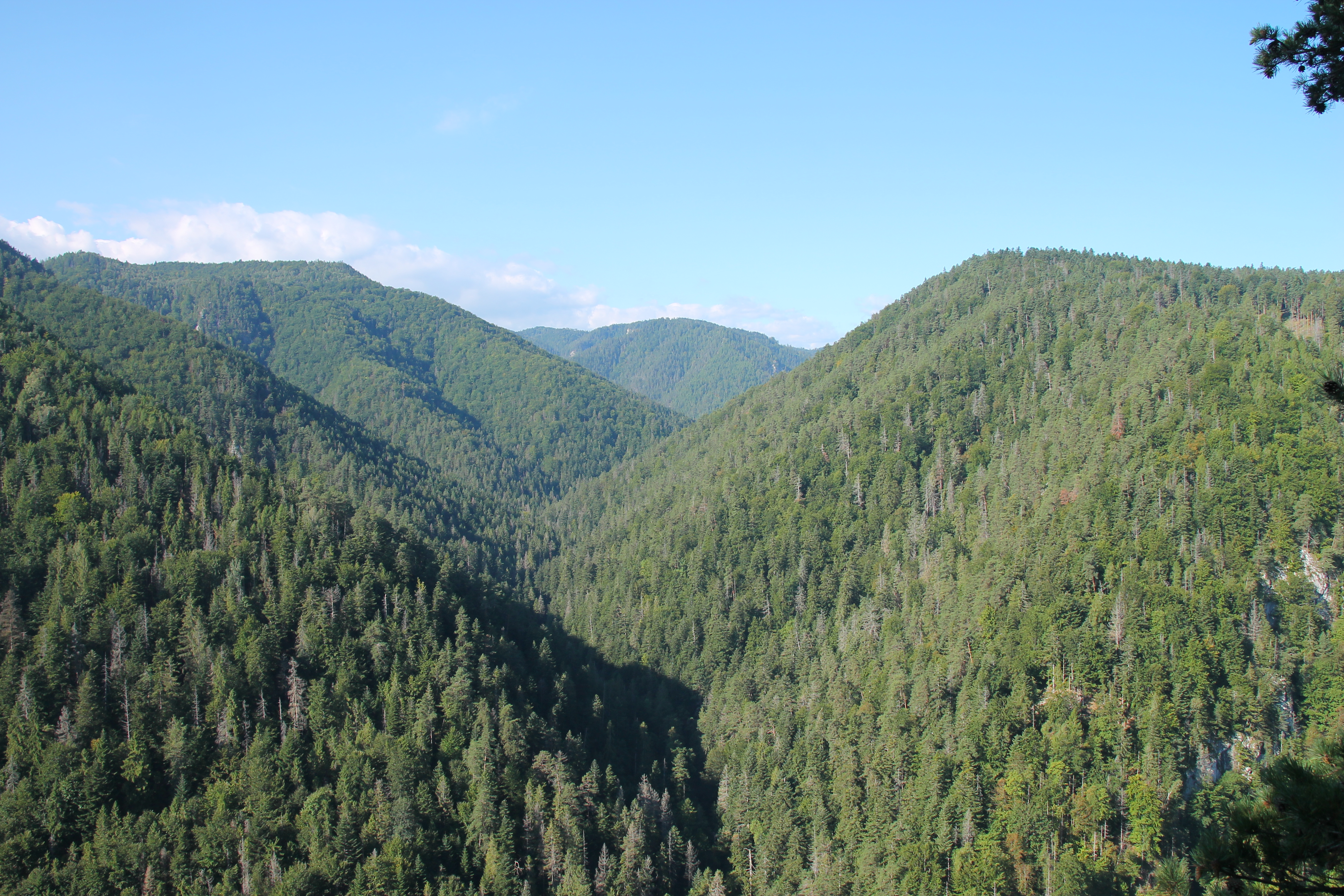
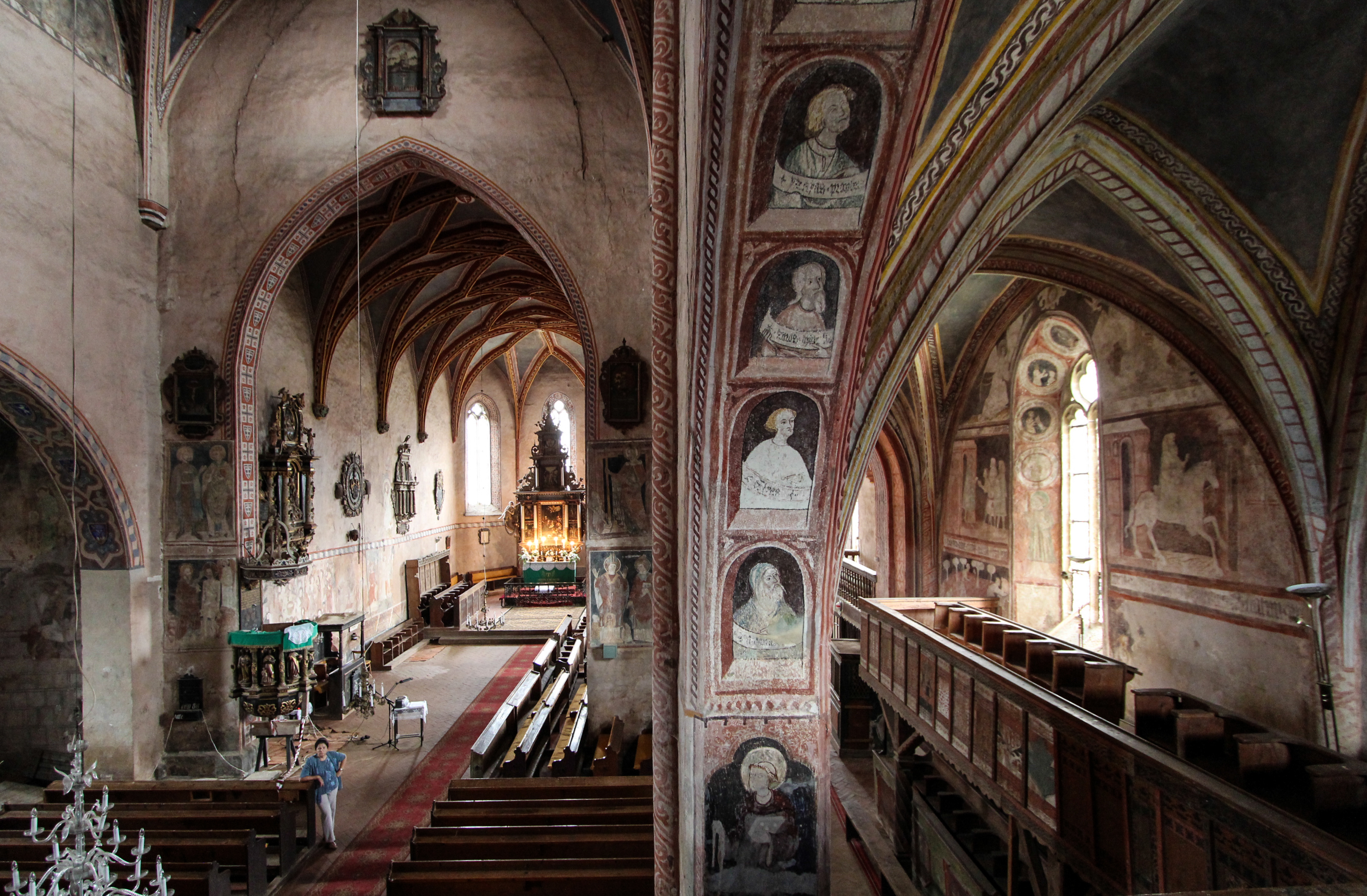
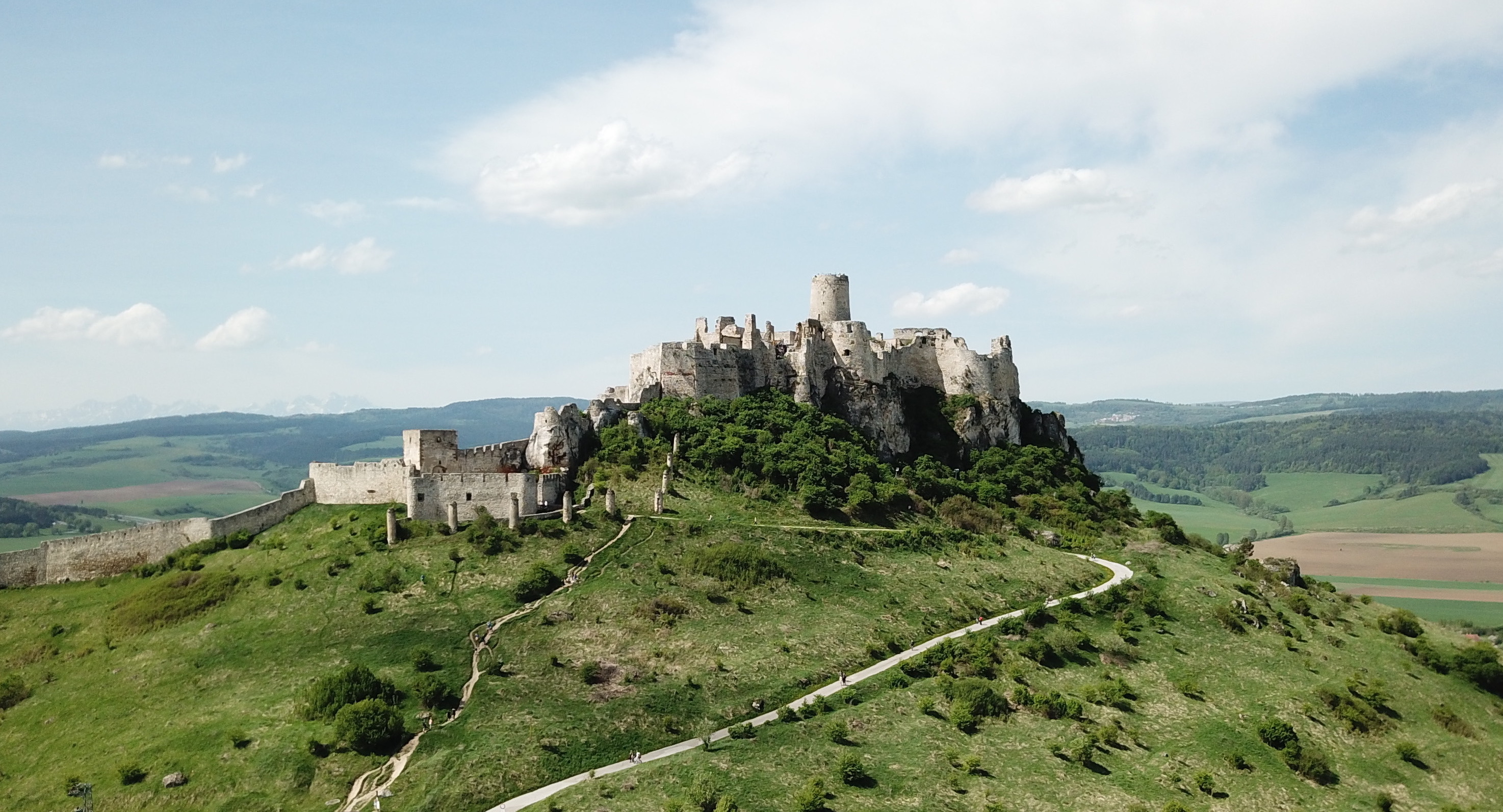
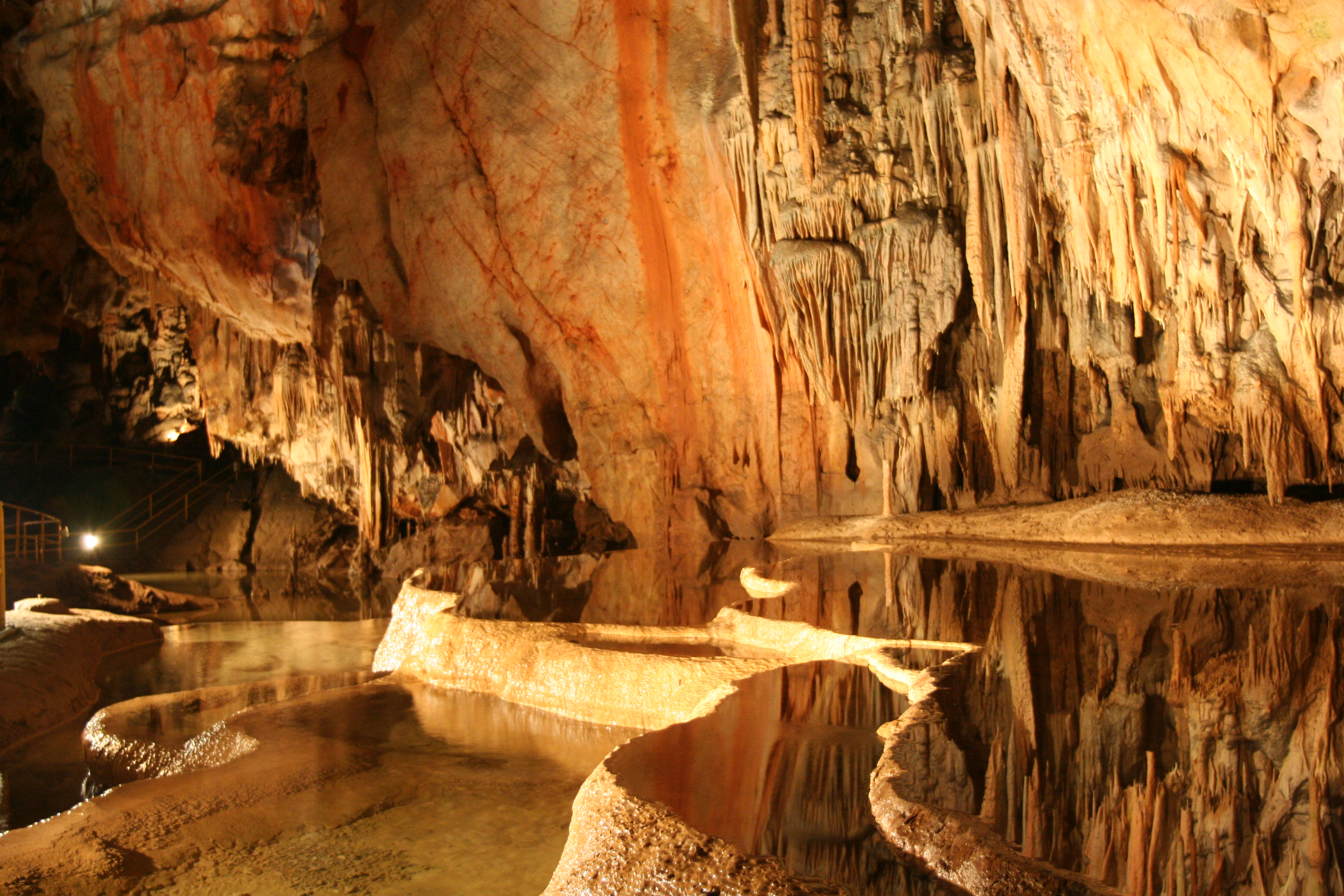
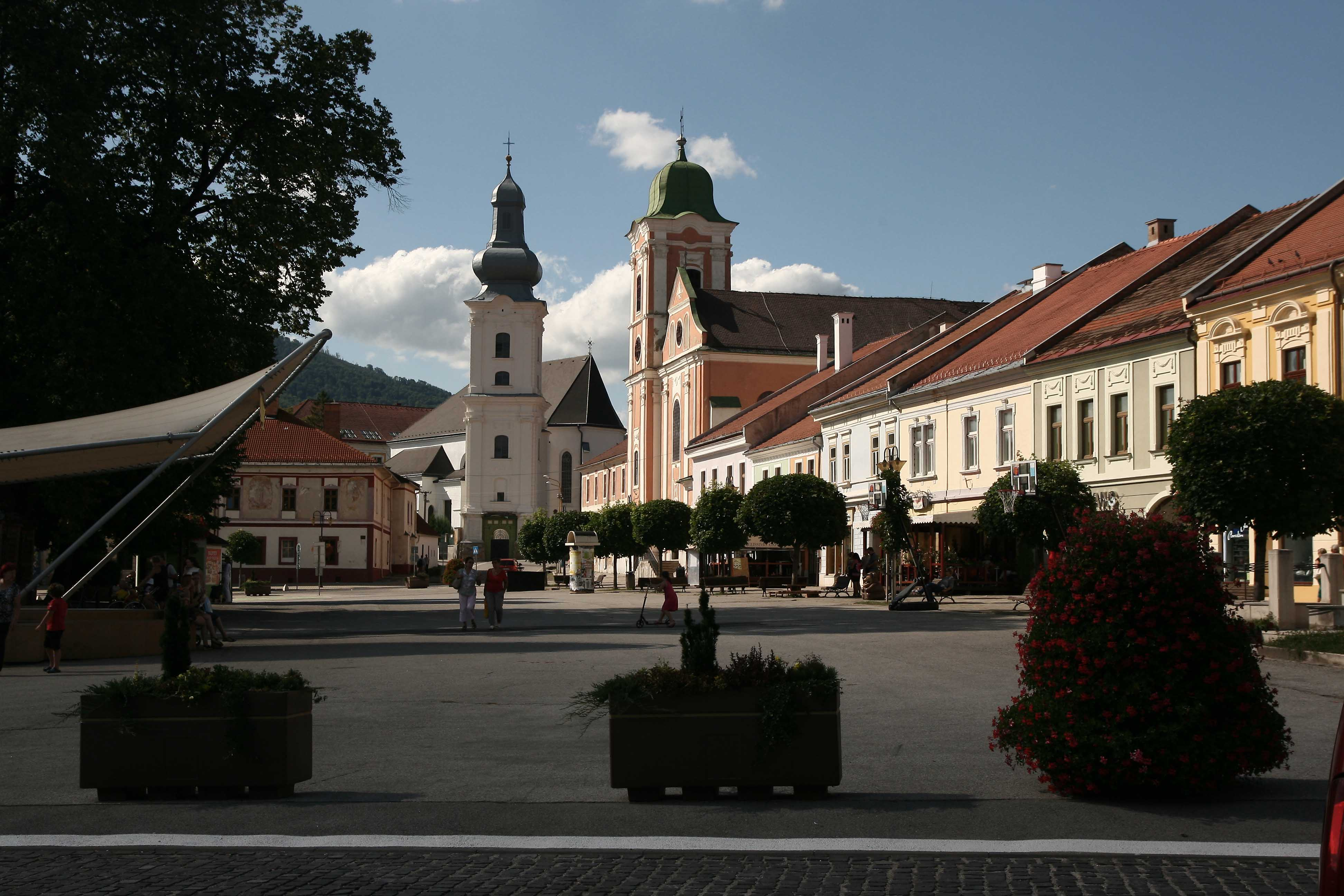
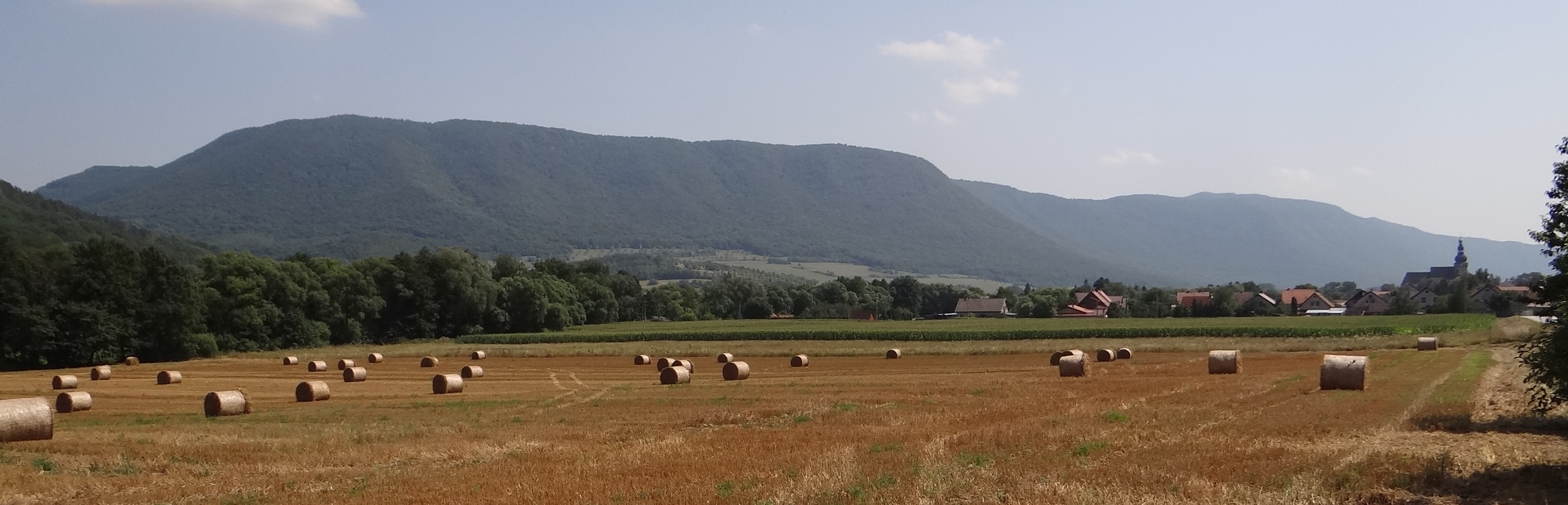
- From the top to bottom-left; Panorama of Markušovce, Cathedral of St. Elizabeth in Košice, Tomášovský View, Interior of gothic church in Štítnik, Spiš Castle, Domica Cave, Rožňava, Slovak Karst National Park

- Flag Coat of arms

- Košice Region
- Country: Slovakia
- Capital: Košice

Government
  - Body: Regional Council of Košice Region
  - Governor: Rastislav Trnka (Independent)

Area
  - Total: 6,754.27 km^{2} (2,607.84 sq mi)
- Highest elevation: 1,476 m (4,843 ft)
- Lowest elevation: 94 m (308 ft)

Population (2025)
  - Total: 777,933

GDP
  - Total: €9.372 billion (2016)
  - Per capita: €11,753 (2016)
- Time zone: UTC+1 (CET)
  - Summer (DST): UTC+2 (CEST)
- ISO 3166 code: SK-KI
- Website: www.kosiceregion.com/en/

The Košice Region (Slovak: Košický kraj, IPA: [ˈkɔʂitskiː ˈkraj]; Hungarian: Kassai kerület) is one of the eight Slovak administrative regions. The region was first established in 1923 and its present borders were established in 1996. It consists of 11 districts (okresy) and 440 municipalities, 17 of which have a town status. About one third of the region's population lives in the agglomeration of Košice, which is its main economic and cultural centre.

== Geography ==
It is located in the southern part of eastern Slovakia and covers an area of 6754.27 km^{2}. The western part of the region is composed of the eastern part of the Slovak Ore Mountains, including its subdivisions: Slovak Karst, Slovak Paradise, Volovské vrchy, Čierna hora. The Hornád Basin is located in the northwest. The area between Slovak Ore Mountains and Slanské vrchy is covered by the Košice Basin, named after the city. The area east of Slanské vrchy is covered by the Eastern Slovak Lowland and there is a volcanic range, Vihorlat Mountains, in the northeast, close to the Ukrainian border. Bigger rivers include Slaná in the southwest, Hornád in the west and centre, Uh and Bodrog in the east, along with a small part of the Tisza river in the extreme southeast. As for administrative divisions, the region borders Prešov Region in the north, Zakarpattia Oblast of Ukraine in the east, Szabolcs-Szatmár-Bereg and Borsod-Abaúj-Zemplén counties of Hungary in the south and the Banská Bystrica Region in the west.

== Population ==
Historical population
Year	Pop.	±%
1970	622,257	—
1980	698,825	+12.3%
1991	741,195	+6.1%
2001	766,012	+3.3%
2011	791,723	+3.4%
2021	782,216	−1.2%
Source: Censuses

Population statistic (10 years)
Year	1995	2005	2015	2025
Count	756,005	771,947	796,650	777,933
Difference		+2.10%	+3.20%	−2.34%

Population statistic
Year	2024	2025
Count	778,799	777,933
Difference		−0.11%

It has a population of 777,933 people (31 December 2025).

=== Ethnicity ===
Census 2021 (1+ %)
Ethnicity	Number	Fraction
Slovak	638,664	81.64%
Hungarian	75,258	9.62%
Not found out	58,300	7.45%
Romani	53,929	6.89%
Rusyn	8252	1.05%
Total	782,216	

In year 2021 was 782,216 people by ethnicity 638,664 as Slovak, 75,258 as Hungarian, 58,300 as Not found out, 53,929 as Romani, 8252 as Rusyn, 4975 as Czech, 2430 as Ukrainian, 2306 as Other, 1777 as German, 859 as Russian, 591 as Vietnamese, 560 as Polish, 279 as Jewish, 266 as English, 189 as Italian, 162 as Moravian, 136 as Serbian, 131 as Bulgarian, 117 as Chinese, 101 as Albanian, 94 as French, 84 as Greek, 81 as Austrian, 80 as Irish, 80 as Romanian, 67 as Croatian, 58 as Canadian, 50 as Turkish, 22 as Silesian, 9 as Iranian and 5 as Korean.

Note on population: The difference values of population numbers in the table "Population statistic" and in the sections "Ethnicity" & "Religion" is caused by the use of various statistical methods.

=== Religion ===
Census 2021 (1+ %)
Religion	Number	Fraction
Roman Catholic Church	378,520	48.39%
None	161,922	20.7%
Greek Catholic Church	74,240	9.49%
Not found out	65,442	8.37%
Calvinist Church	37,731	4.82%
Evangelical Church	29,409	3.76%
Eastern Orthodox Church	14,954	1.91%
Total	782,216	

In year 2021 was 782,216 people by religion 378,520 from Roman Catholic Church, 161,922 from None, 74,240 from Greek Catholic Church, 65,442 from Not found out, 37,731 from Calvinist Church, 29,409 from Evangelical Church, 14,954 from Eastern Orthodox Church, 5363 from Jehovah's Witnesses, 3297 from Apostolic Church, 2487 from Christian Congregations in Slovakia, 1699 from Other, 1649 from Ad hoc movements, 1355 from Other and not ascertained christian church, 686 from Buddhism, 592 from United Methodist Church, 532 from Seventh-day Adventist Church, 445 from Islam, 392 from Church of the Brethren, 374 from Paganism and natural spirituality, 372 from Baptists Church, 311 from Jewish community, 193 from Old Catholic Church, 97 from Hinduism, 54 from Church of Jesus Christ of Latter-day Saints, 48 from Czechoslovak Hussite Church, 36 from Bahá'i Community and 16 from New Apostolic Church.

The average population density in the region is 117.9 inhabitants per km^{2}, which is very similar to the country's average (110 per km^{2}). The largest towns are Košice, Michalovce, Spišská Nová Ves, Trebišov and Rožňava. According to the 2001 census, there were 766,012 inhabitants in the region, with a majority of Slovaks (81.8%), but there is a numerous Hungarian minority (11.2%) in the south, and there are minorities of Roma (3.9%) and Czechs (<1%).

== Economy ==
The economy of the Košice region accounted for 11.47% of Slovakia's GDP in 2013, which made it the region with the second highest GDP in Slovakia after the Bratislava region. However, it lags behind the majority of Slovakia's regions in GDP per capita.

The salaries are on average 40% higher in the Bratislava region than in the Košice region, but the living costs are considerably higher there as well.

The unemployment in the region was at 15.6% in 2014.

== Politics ==
Current governor of Košice region is Rastislav Trnka (Independent). He won with 37,8 %. In election 2017 was elected also regional parliament :

Regional Council of Košice region

Type
- Type: Unicameral
- Houses: Regional Council

Leadership
- Governor: Rastislav Trnka, Independent
- Vice governors: Daniel Rusnák, KDH
- Karol Pataky, Aliancia/Szövetség

Structure
- Seats: 57 councilors
- Political groups: Administration (34): Centre-right coalition (16); Independents (9); Aliancia/Szövetség and Independents (9); Other parties (23): Smer-SD (9); Hlas-SD (6); SNS and Independents (6); Non-Inscrits (2)

Elections
- Last election: 4 November 2017

Meeting place
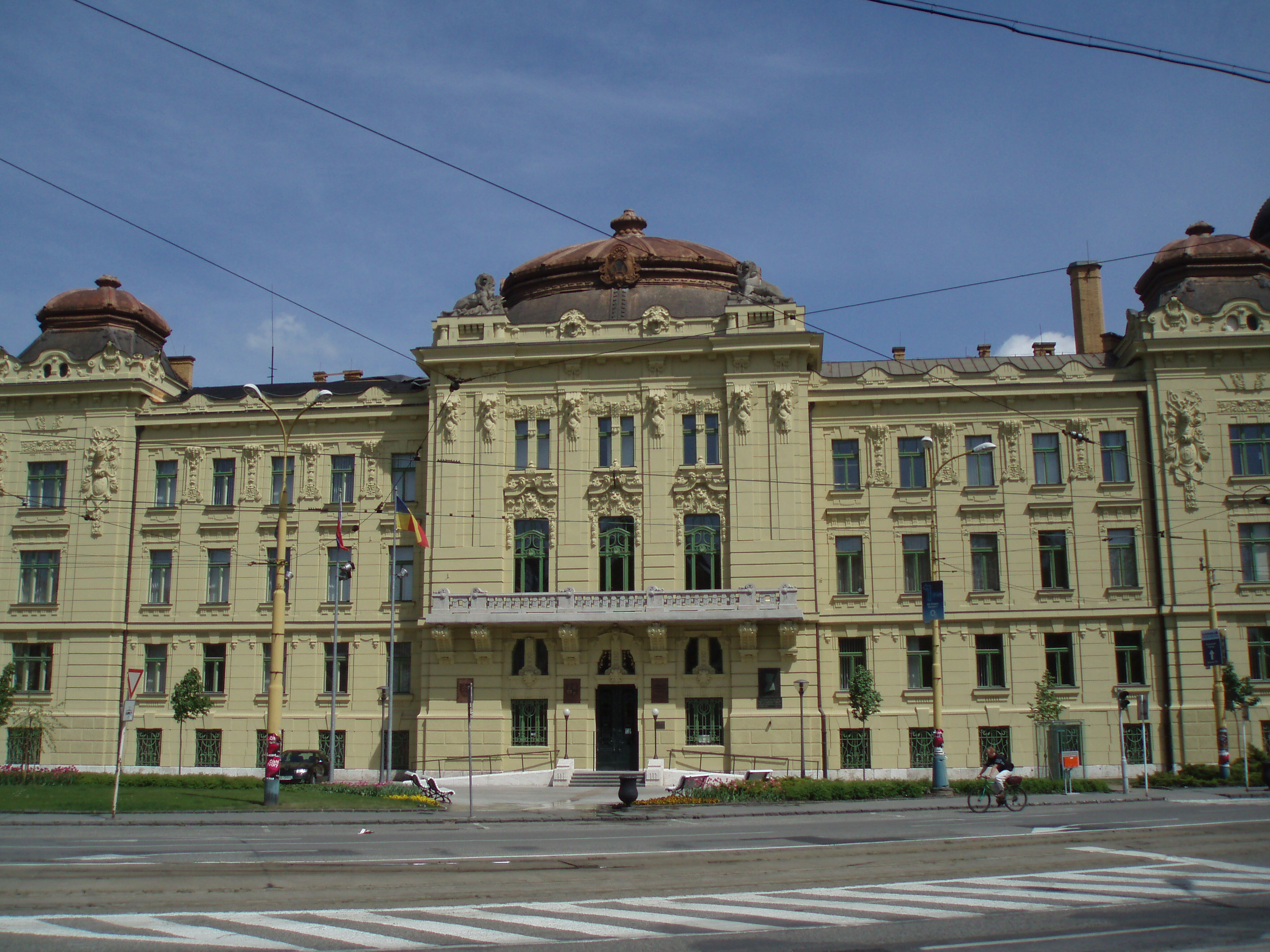
- Governor's office, Košice

Website
- Council of Košice region

== Administrative division ==
The Košice Region consists of 11 districts. In Košice city itself there are four districts; seven districts are outside the city. There are 440 municipalities, of which 17 are towns.

District	Area [km^{2}]	Population
Gelnica	584.33	31,884
Košice I	85.45	62,243
Košice II	80.54	77,569
Košice III	16.83	26,964
Košice IV	60.90	55,510
Košice-okolie	1534.58	134,540
Michalovce	1019.20	107,617
Rožňava	1173.33	58,189
Sobrance	538.15	22,118
Spišská Nová Ves	587.45	98,622
Trebišov	1073.45	102,677

Population and area values are current for year 2025.

== See also ==
- Košice Self-governing Region
