= Geography of Slovakia =

- Continent: Europe
- Region: Central Europe
- Area
  - Total: 49,035 km^{2} (18,933 sq mi)
- Highest point: Gerlachovský štít
- Longest river: Váh
- Largest lake: Orava reservoir
- Climate: continental climate

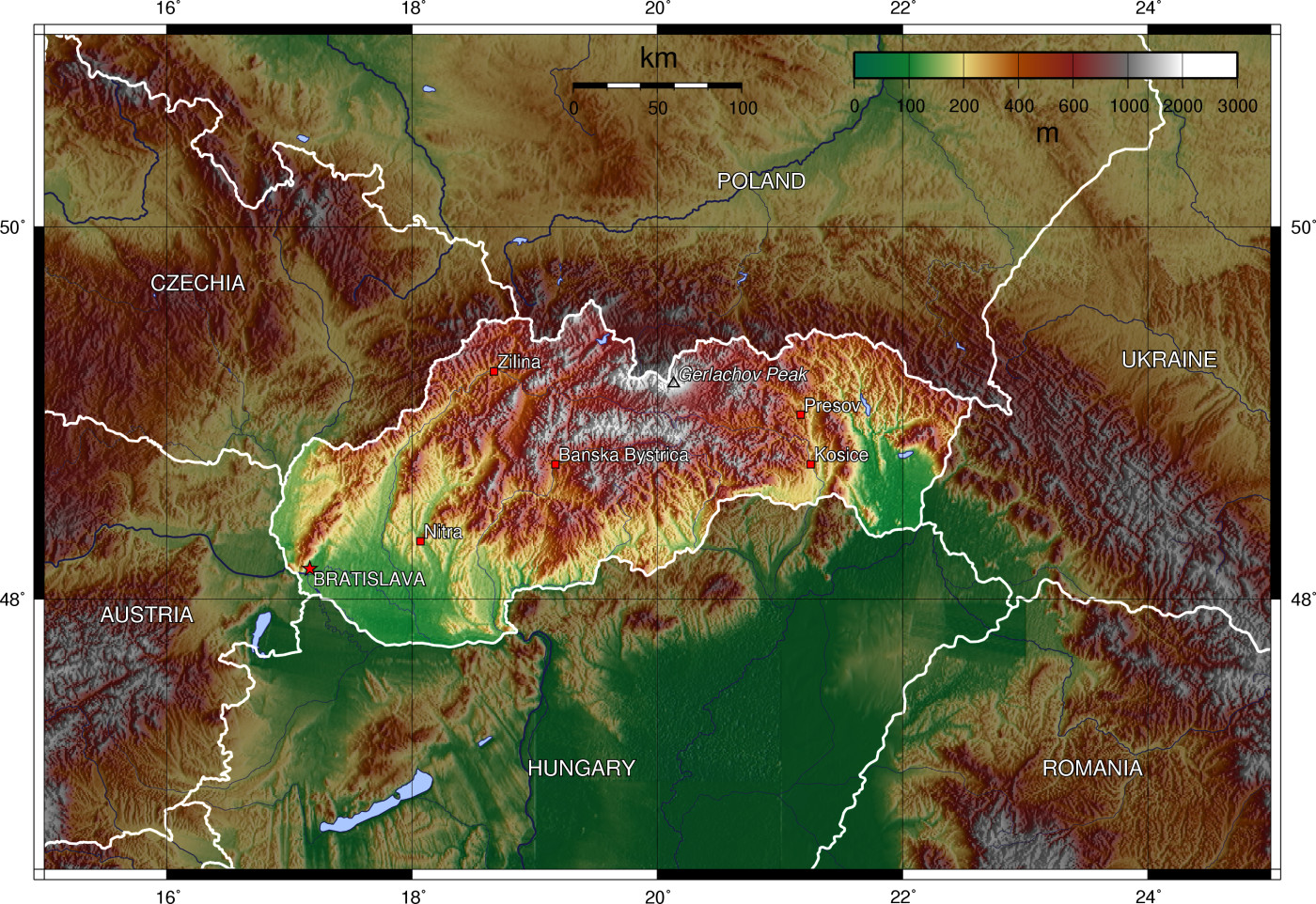
A topographical map of Slovakia

Slovakia is a landlocked Central European country with mountainous regions in the north and flat terrain in the south. During much of the Holocene, Slovakia was much more forested than today. Decline of the forest occurred in as consequence of the Valachian colonization and the development of mining in the territory.

== Statistics ==
Land use:

Agricultural land: 47%

Arable land: 28.9%; permanent crops: 0.4%; permanent pasture: 10.8%

Forest: 40.2%

Other: 19.7% (2011 est.)

Natural resources:

Lignite, small amounts of iron ore, copper and manganese ore; salt; arable land, brown coal

Natural Hazards:

It is at high risk of river flooding, urban flooding, landslides and wildfires, whilst being at a medium risk of earthquakes and extreme heat.

Environment-international agreements:

Party to: Air Pollution, Air Pollution-Nitrogen Oxides, Air Pollution-Persistent Organic Pollutants, Air Pollution-Sulfur 85, Air Pollution-Sulfur 94, Air Pollution-Volatile Organic Compounds, Antarctic Treaty, Biodiversity, Climate Change, Climate Change-Kyoto Protocol, Desertification, Endangered Species, Environmental Modification, Hazardous Wastes, Law of the Sea, Ozone Layer Protection, Ship Pollution, Wetlands, Whaling.

Signed, but not ratified: none of the selected agreements

== Area ==
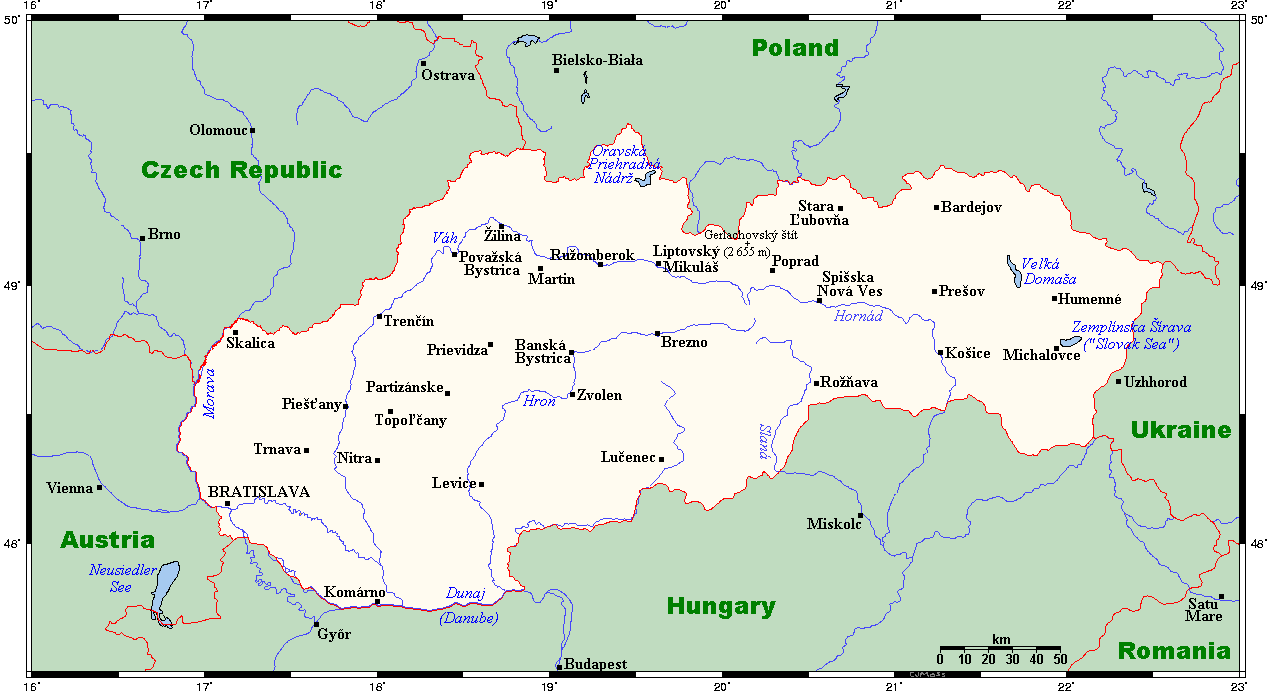
Slovakia's cities and main towns

Slovakia lies between 49°36'48" and 47°44'21" northern latitude and 16°50'56" and 22°33'53" eastern longitude.

The northernmost point is near Beskydok, a mountain on the border with Poland near the village of Oravská Polhora in the Beskids. The southernmost point is near the village of Patince on the Danube on the border with Hungary. The westernmost point is on the Morava River near Záhorská Ves on the Austrian border. The easternmost point is close to the summit of Kremenec, a mountain near the village of Nová Sedlica at the meeting point of Slovak, Polish, and Ukrainian borders.

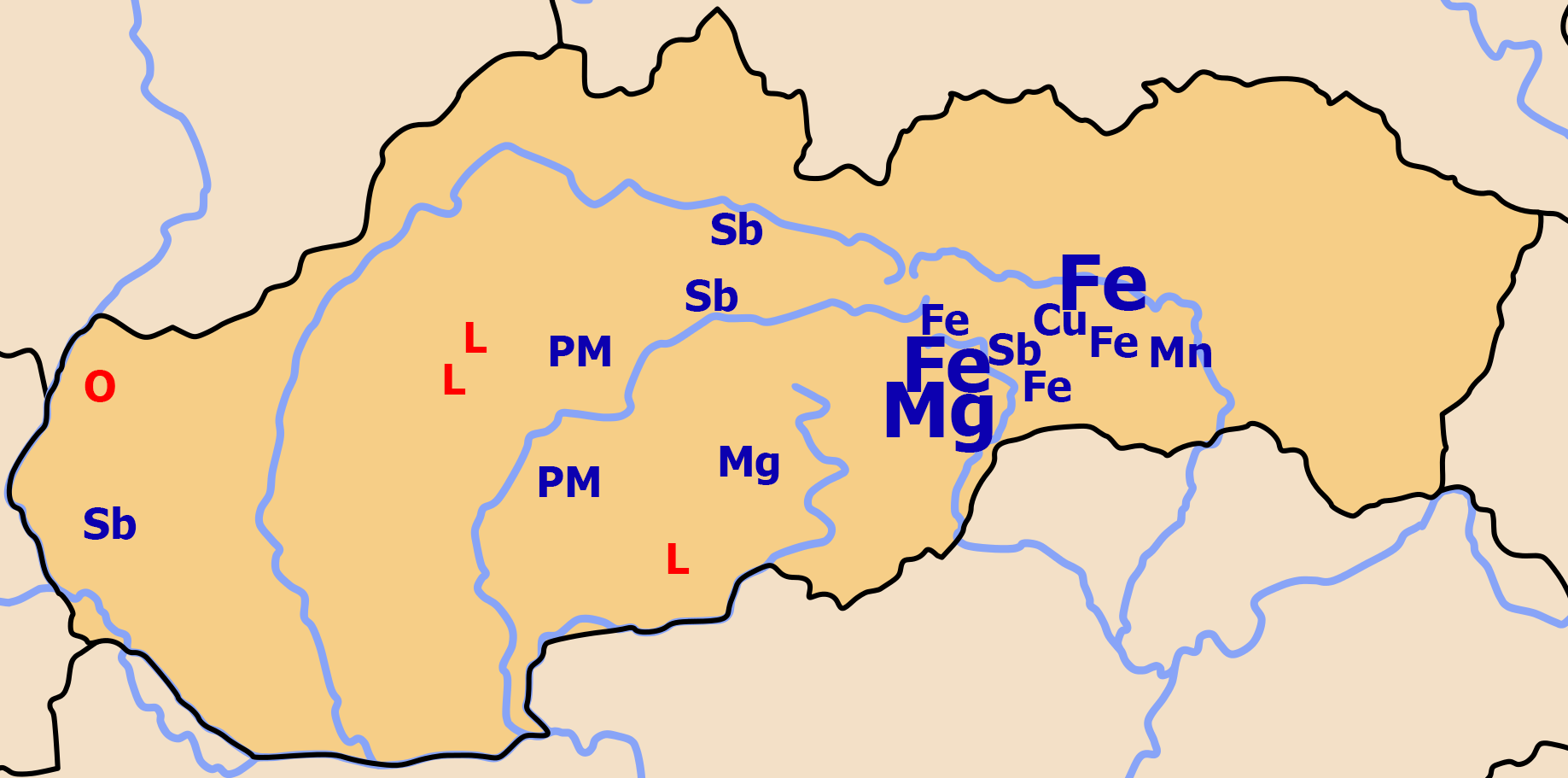
Natural resources of Slovakia. Mg — magnesium, Mn — manganese, Fe — iron ore, Cu — copper, Sb — antimony; PM — polymetals (Pb, Zn and similar metals); L — lignite, O — oil.

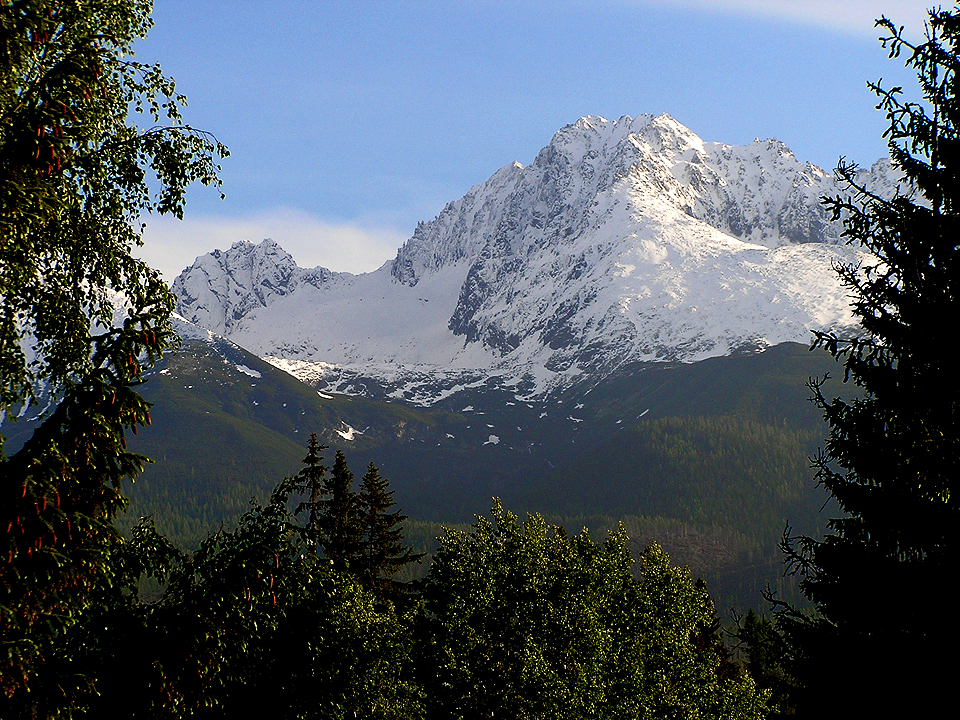
The highest mountain

The highest point is at the summit of Gerlachovský štít in the High Tatras, 2,655 m (8,710.6 ft), the lowest point is the surface of the Bodrog River on the Hungarian border at 94 m (308.4 ft).

The country's area is 48,845 km^{2} (18,859 sq mi). 31% is arable land, 17% pastures, 41% forests, 3% cultivated land. The remaining 8% is mostly covered with human structures and infrastructure, and partly with rocky mountain ridges and other unimproved land.

Slovakia borders Poland in the north - 547 km (340 mi), Ukraine in the east - 98 km (61 mi), Hungary in the south - 679 km (422 mi), Austria in the south-west - 106 km (66 mi), and the Czech Republic in the north-west - 252 km (157 mi) for a total border length of 1,672 km (1,039 mi).

The village of Veľké Slemence (Ukrainian: Vel'ki Selmentsi/Вельке Селменці, Hungarian: Nagyszelmenc) is an anomaly, as it is a village with a majority of Hungarians, but it is split between Slovakia and Ukraine.

=== National parks ===
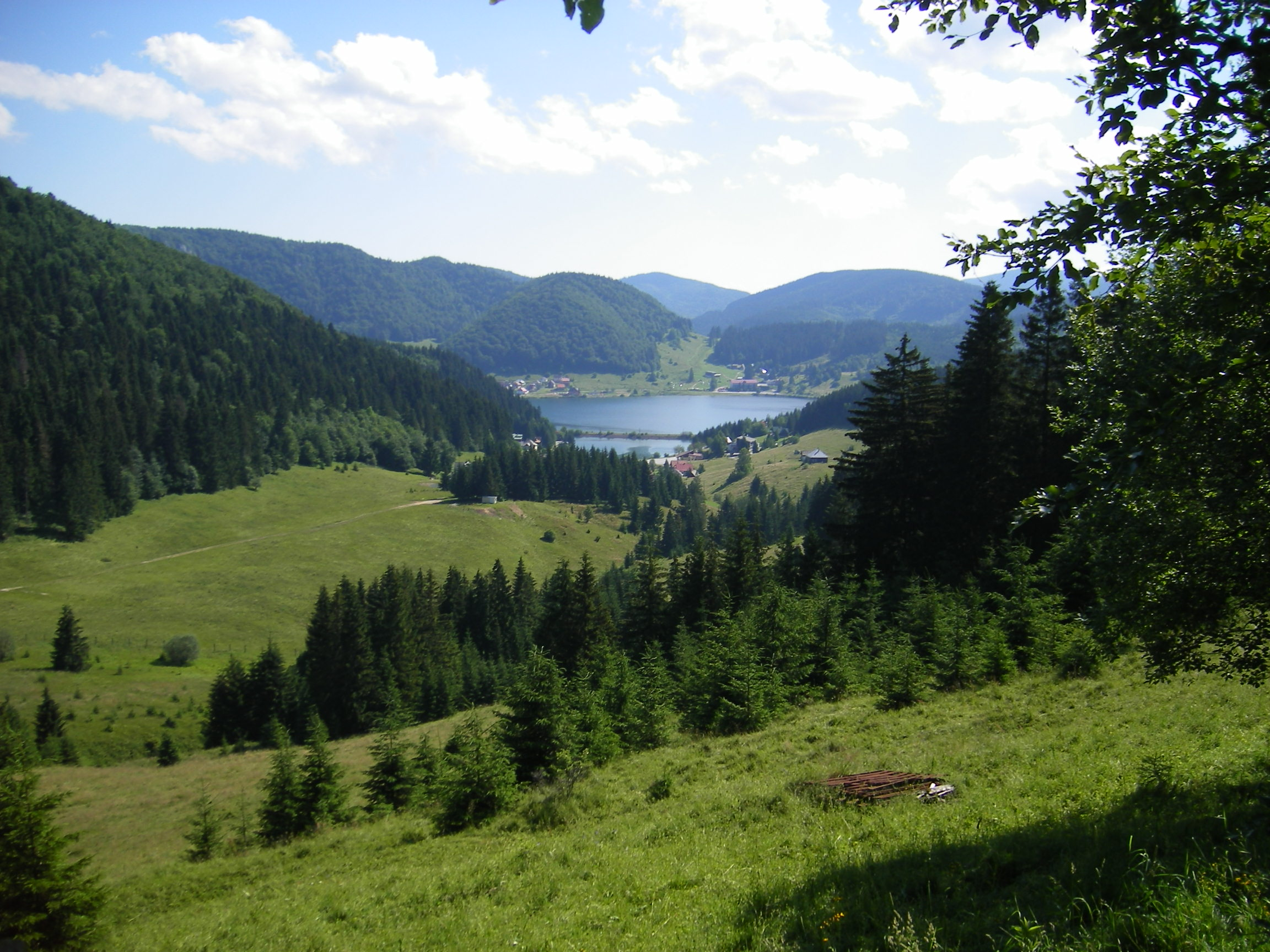
Slovak Paradise National Park

There are 9 national parks in Slovakia, covering 6.5% of the Slovak land surface.

Name	Established	Area (km^{2})
Tatra National Park	1949	738
Low Tatras National Park	1978	728
Veľká Fatra National Park	2002	404
Slovak Karst National Park	2002	346
Poloniny National Park	1997	298
Malá Fatra National Park	1988	226
Muránska planina National Park	1998	203
Slovak Paradise National Park	1988	197
Pieniny National Park	1967	38

== Geographical features ==
=== Tatra mountains ===
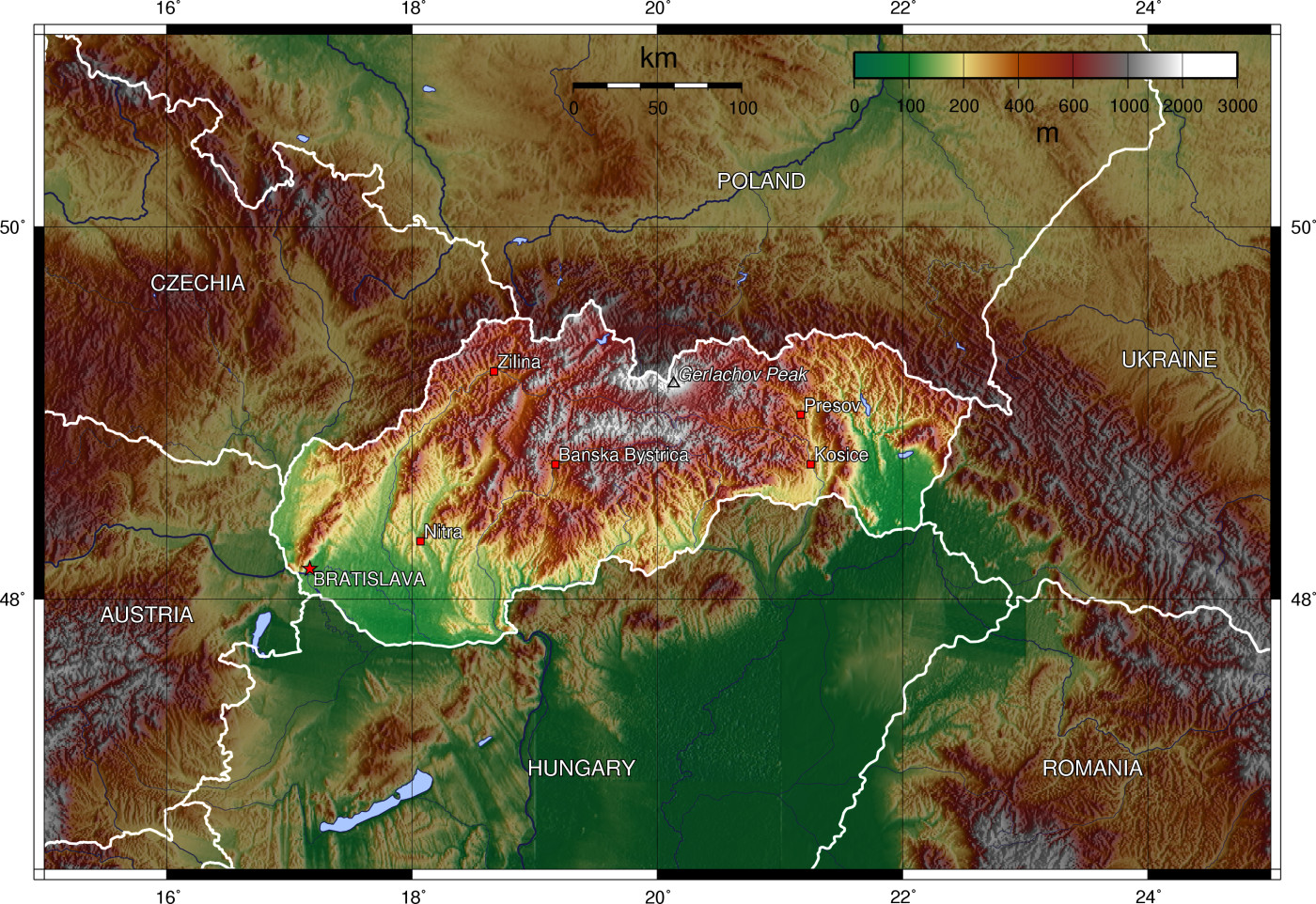
A topographical map of Slovakia

The Tatra Mountains, with 29 peaks higher than 2,500 metres (8,202 feet) AMSL, are the highest mountain range in the Carpathian Mountains. The Tatras occupy an area of 750 square kilometres (290 sq mi), of which the greater part 600 square kilometres (232 sq mi) lies in Slovakia. They are divided into several parts.

To the north, close to the Polish border, are the High Tatras which are a popular hiking and skiing destination and home to many scenic lakes and valleys as well as the highest point in Slovakia, the Gerlachovský štít at 2,655 metres (8,711 ft) and the country's highly symbolic mountain Kriváň. To the west are the Western Tatras with their highest peak of Bystrá at 2,248 metres (7,375 ft) and to the east are the Belianske Tatras, smallest by area.

Separated from the Tatras proper by the valley of the Váh river are the Low Tatras, with their highest peak of Ďumbier at 2,043 metres (6,703 ft).

The Tatra mountain range is represented as one of the three hills on the coat of arms of Slovakia.

=== Caves ===
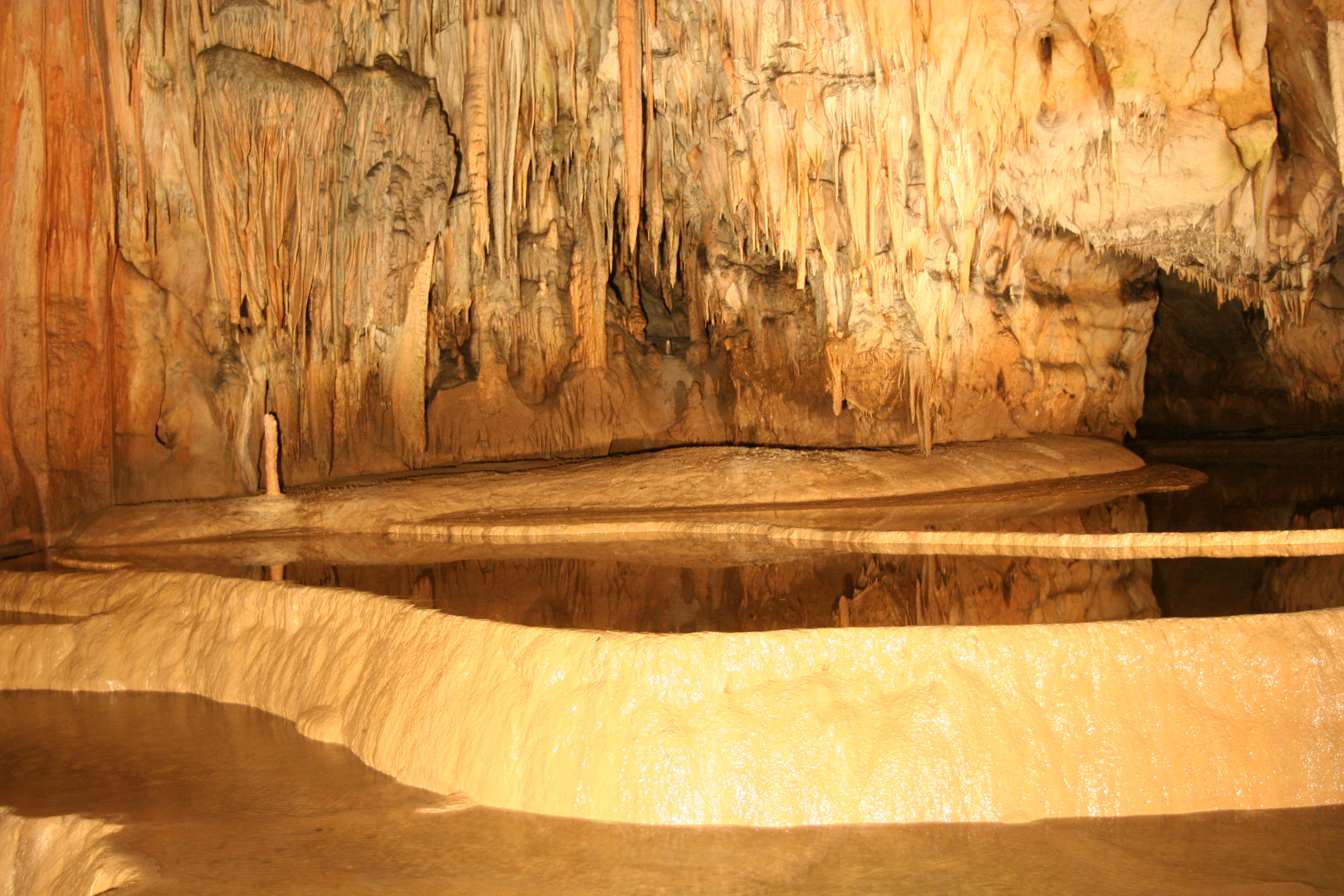
Domica Cave

Slovakia has hundreds of caves and caverns under its mountains, of which 30 are open to the public. Most of the caves have stalagmites rising from the ground and stalactites hanging from above. There are currently five Slovak caves under UNESCO's World Heritage Site status. They are Dobšiná Ice Cave, Domica, Gombasek Cave, Jasovská Cave and Ochtinská Aragonite Cave. Other caves open to the public include Belianska Cave, Demänovská Cave of Liberty, Demänovská Ice Cave or Bystrianska Cave.

=== Rivers ===
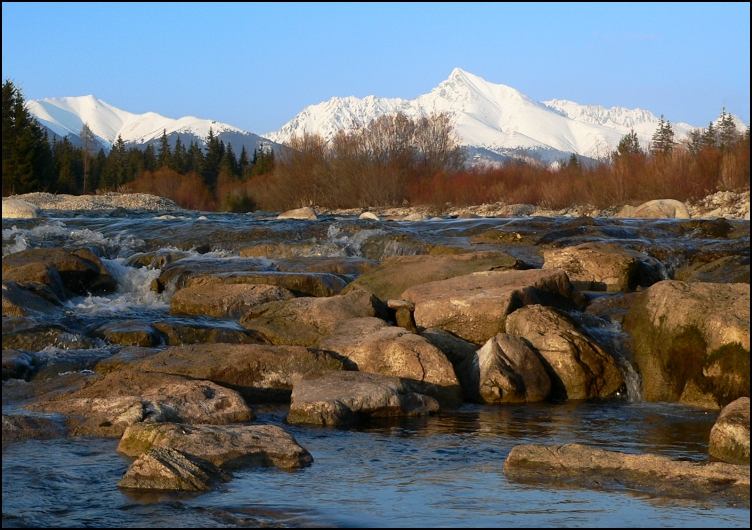
Belá River

Most of the rivers arise in the Slovak mountains. Some only pass through Slovakia, while others make a natural border with surrounding countries (more than 620 kilometres [390 mi]). For example, the Dunajec (17 kilometres [11 mi]) to the north, the Danube (172 kilometres [107 mi]) to the south or the Morava (119 kilometres [74 mi]) to the West. The total length of the rivers on Slovak territory is 49,774 kilometres (30,928 mi).

The longest river in Slovakia is the Váh (403 kilometres [250 mi]), the shortest is the Čierna voda. Other important and large rivers are the Myjava, the Nitra (197 kilometres [122 mi]), the Orava, the Hron (298 kilometres [185 mi]), the Hornád (193 kilometres [120 mi]), the Slaná (110 kilometres [68 mi]), the Ipeľ (232 kilometres [144 mi], forming the border with Hungary), the Bodrog, the Laborec, the Latorica and the Ondava.

The biggest volume of discharge in Slovak rivers is during spring, when the snow melts from the mountains. The only exception is the Danube, whose discharge is the greatest during summer when the snow melts in the Alps. The Danube is the largest river that flows through Slovakia.

== Climate ==
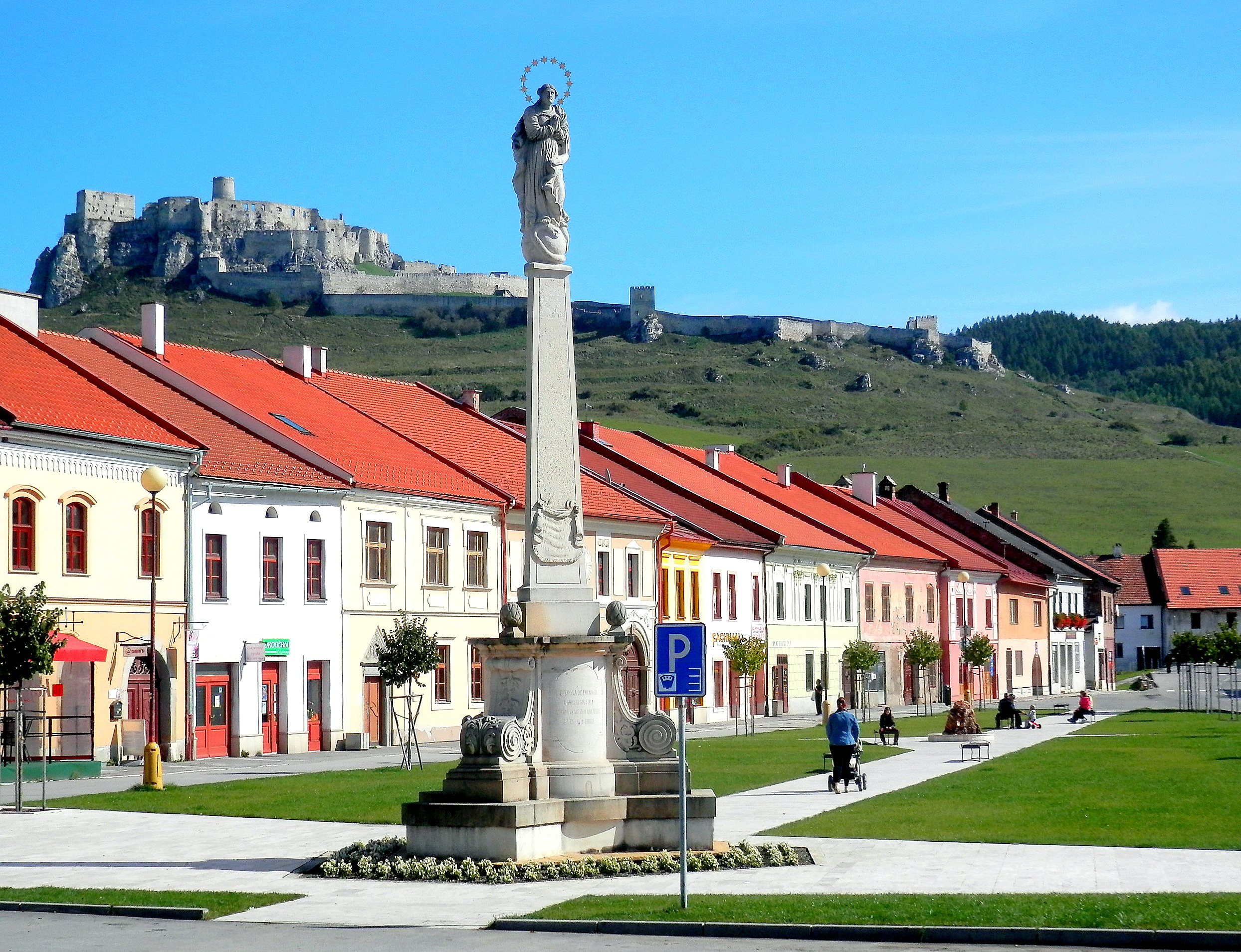
Summer in Spišské Podhradie

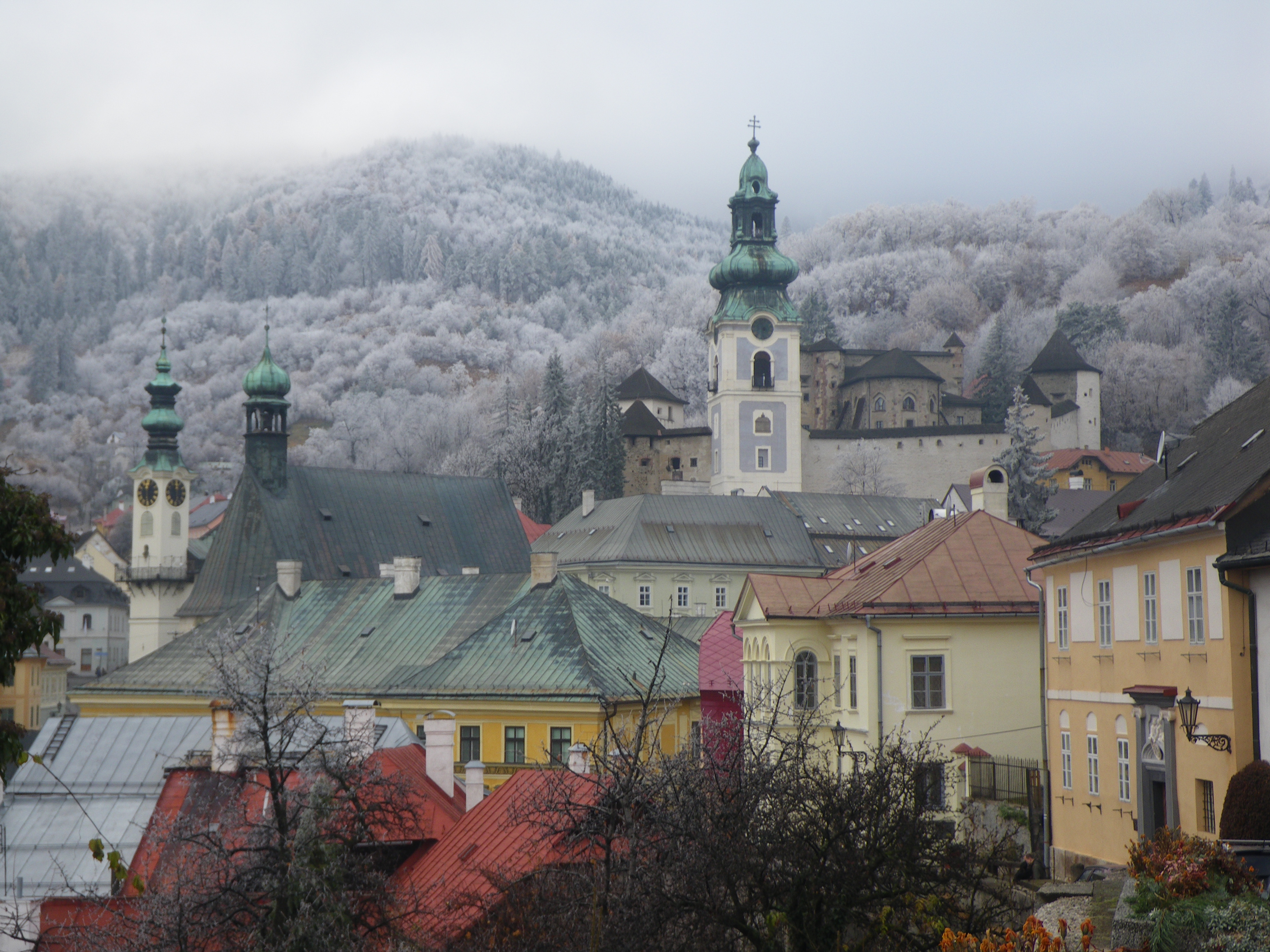
Winter in Banská Štiavnica; the town is a UNESCO World Heritage Site.

The Slovak climate lies between the temperate and continental climate zones with relatively warm summers and cold, cloudy and humid winters. Temperature extremes are between −41 and 40.3 °C (−41.8 and 104.5 °F) although temperatures below −30 °C (−22 °F) are rare. The weather differs from the mountainous north to the plains in the south.

The warmest region is Bratislava and Southern Slovakia where the temperatures may reach 30 °C (86 °F) in summer, occasionally to 39 °C (102 °F) in Hurbanovo. During night, the temperatures drop to 20 °C (68 °F). The daily temperatures in winter average in the range of −5 °C (23 °F) to 10 °C (50 °F). During night it may be freezing, but usually not below −10 °C (14 °F).

The dry continental air brings in the summer heat and winter frosts. In contrast, oceanic air brings rainfalls and reduces summer temperatures. In the lowlands and valleys, there is often fog, especially in winter.

Spring starts on the March equinox, around 20 March, and is characterised by colder weather with an average daily temperature of 9 °C (48 °F) in the first weeks and about 14 °C (57 °F) in May and 17 °C (63 °F) in June. In Slovakia, the weather and climate in the spring are very unstable.

Summer starts on the June solstice, around 20–21 June, and is usually characterised by hot weather with daily temperatures exceeding 30 °C (86 °F). July and August are the warmest months with temperatures up to about 37 to 40 °C (99 to 104 °F), especially in regions of southern Slovakia - in the urban area of Komárno, Hurbanovo or Štúrovo. Showers or thunderstorms may occur because of the summer monsoon called Medardova kvapka (Medard drop - 40 days of rain). Summer in Northern Slovakia is usually mild with temperatures around 25 °C (77 °F) (less in the mountains).

Autumn in Slovakia on the September equinox, starts around 22–23 September, and is mostly characterised by wet weather and wind, although the first weeks can be very warm and sunny. The average temperature in September is around 14 °C (57 °F), in November to 3 °C (37 °F). Late September and early October is a dry and sunny time of year (so-called Indian summer).

Winter starts on the December solstice, around 21–22 December, with temperatures around −5 to −10 °C (23 to 14 °F). In December and January, it is usually snowing, these are the coldest months of the year. At lower altitudes, snow does not stay the whole winter, it changes into the thaw and frost. Winters are colder in the mountains, where the snow usually lasts until March or April and the night temperatures fall to −20 °C (−4 °F) and colder.

=== Examples ===
Climate data for Bratislava (1981–2010)
Month	Jan	Feb	Mar	Apr	May	Jun	Jul	Aug	Sep	Oct	Nov	Dec	Year
Record high °C (°F)	19.8 (67.6)	19.1 (66.4)	25.0 (77.0)	30.3 (86.5)	33.4 (92.1)	36.3 (97.3)	38.2 (100.8)	39.3 (102.7)	34.0 (93.2)	30.0 (86.0)	21.3 (70.3)	17.9 (64.2)	39.3 (102.7)
Mean daily maximum °C (°F)	2.7 (36.9)	5.1 (41.2)	10.3 (50.5)	16.7 (62.1)	21.8 (71.2)	24.9 (76.8)	27.5 (81.5)	27.0 (80.6)	21.7 (71.1)	15.6 (60.1)	8.2 (46.8)	3.3 (37.9)	15.4 (59.7)
Daily mean °C (°F)	−0.4 (31.3)	1.2 (34.2)	5.5 (41.9)	11.0 (51.8)	16.0 (60.8)	19.1 (66.4)	21.3 (70.3)	20.7 (69.3)	15.9 (60.6)	10.4 (50.7)	4.9 (40.8)	0.7 (33.3)	10.5 (50.9)
Mean daily minimum °C (°F)	−3.4 (25.9)	−2.3 (27.9)	1.3 (34.3)	5.4 (41.7)	10.2 (50.4)	13.4 (56.1)	15.4 (59.7)	15.0 (59.0)	11.0 (51.8)	6.1 (43.0)	1.8 (35.2)	−1.9 (28.6)	6.0 (42.8)
Record low °C (°F)	−24.6 (−12.3)	−20 (−4)	−15.1 (4.8)	−4.4 (24.1)	−2 (28)	3.0 (37.4)	7.0 (44.6)	5.0 (41.0)	−2.0 (28.4)	−8 (18)	−12 (10)	−20 (−4)	−24.6 (−12.3)
Average precipitation mm (inches)	39 (1.5)	37 (1.5)	38 (1.5)	34 (1.3)	55 (2.2)	57 (2.2)	53 (2.1)	59 (2.3)	55 (2.2)	38 (1.5)	54 (2.1)	46 (1.8)	565 (22.2)
Average snowfall cm (inches)	10.7 (4.2)	5.7 (2.2)	1.6 (0.6)	0.2 (0.1)	0.0 (0.0)	0.0 (0.0)	0.0 (0.0)	0.0 (0.0)	0.0 (0.0)	0.2 (0.1)	1.8 (0.7)	4.0 (1.6)	24.2 (9.5)
Average relative humidity (%)	83	78	71	64	67	66	64	65	73	78	83	85	73
Mean monthly sunshine hours	65.1	81.9	151.9	204.0	263.5	270.0	275.9	269.7	207.0	142.6	60.0	46.5	2,038.1
Average ultraviolet index	1	2	3	4	6	7	7	6	4	3	1	1	4
Source: Pogodaiklimat.ru, Climatemps and Weather Atlas

Climate data for Košice, Slovakia (1991−2020 normals, extremes 1980−present)
Month	Jan	Feb	Mar	Apr	May	Jun	Jul	Aug	Sep	Oct	Nov	Dec	Year
Record high °C (°F)	13.1 (55.6)	16.5 (61.7)	23.2 (73.8)	28.7 (83.7)	31.7 (89.1)	34.6 (94.3)	38.0 (100.4)	36.1 (97.0)	34.1 (93.4)	26.6 (79.9)	22.4 (72.3)	13.3 (55.9)	38.0 (100.4)
Mean daily maximum °C (°F)	1.0 (33.8)	3.7 (38.7)	9.9 (49.8)	16.5 (61.7)	21.2 (70.2)	24.8 (76.6)	26.6 (79.9)	26.8 (80.2)	21.2 (70.2)	14.8 (58.6)	8.1 (46.6)	1.8 (35.2)	14.7 (58.5)
Daily mean °C (°F)	−2.6 (27.3)	−0.4 (31.3)	4.5 (40.1)	9.6 (49.3)	14.6 (58.3)	17.5 (63.5)	19.3 (66.7)	19.1 (66.4)	14.8 (58.6)	9.4 (48.9)	3.0 (37.4)	−1.3 (29.7)	9.0 (48.1)
Mean daily minimum °C (°F)	−4.8 (23.4)	−3.5 (25.7)	0.0 (32.0)	5.0 (41.0)	9.6 (49.3)	13.2 (55.8)	14.8 (58.6)	14.6 (58.3)	10.1 (50.2)	5.3 (41.5)	1.2 (34.2)	−3.3 (26.1)	5.2 (41.3)
Record low °C (°F)	−25.9 (−14.6)	−22.3 (−8.1)	−16.4 (2.5)	−7.2 (19.0)	−2.0 (28.4)	2.9 (37.2)	5.6 (42.1)	1.2 (34.2)	0.3 (32.5)	−7.5 (18.5)	−13.5 (7.7)	−19.2 (−2.6)	−25.9 (−14.6)
Average precipitation mm (inches)	25.7 (1.01)	26.8 (1.06)	23.6 (0.93)	42.4 (1.67)	69.4 (2.73)	87.5 (3.44)	93.5 (3.68)	66.5 (2.62)	50.1 (1.97)	51.1 (2.01)	40.2 (1.58)	36.1 (1.42)	612.9 (24.12)
Average precipitation days	12.7	10.8	9.0	10.8	13.3	13.4	12.9	9.7	10.7	11.0	11.9	14.2	140.4
Average relative humidity (%)	78	72	59	51	51	55	53	53	53	61	76	82	62
Mean monthly sunshine hours	67	86	166	204	266	259	282	258	216	153	68	47	2,072
Source 1: World Meteorological Organisation
Source 2: Danish Meteorological Institute (humidity and sun 1931–1960)

Climate data for Hurbanovo
Month	Jan	Feb	Mar	Apr	May	Jun	Jul	Aug	Sep	Oct	Nov	Dec	Year
Record high °C (°F)	13.4 (56.1)	20.8 (69.4)	25.7 (78.3)	30.0 (86.0)	33.4 (92.1)	34.8 (94.6)	40.3 (104.5)	38.0 (100.4)	33.4 (92.1)	27.6 (81.7)	23.2 (73.8)	19.0 (66.2)	40.3 (104.5)
Mean daily maximum °C (°F)	1.6 (34.9)	4.8 (40.6)	10.6 (51.1)	16.6 (61.9)	21.7 (71.1)	24.7 (76.5)	26.8 (80.2)	26.2 (79.2)	22.3 (72.1)	16.3 (61.3)	8.4 (47.1)	3.2 (37.8)	15.3 (59.5)
Daily mean °C (°F)	−1.5 (29.3)	1.0 (33.8)	5.4 (41.7)	10.7 (51.3)	15.6 (60.1)	18.7 (65.7)	20.2 (68.4)	19.5 (67.1)	15.5 (59.9)	10.2 (50.4)	4.7 (40.5)	0.4 (32.7)	10.0 (50.0)
Mean daily minimum °C (°F)	−4.7 (23.5)	−2.5 (27.5)	0.9 (33.6)	5.0 (41.0)	9.6 (49.3)	12.7 (54.9)	13.8 (56.8)	13.5 (56.3)	10.1 (50.2)	5.4 (41.7)	1.4 (34.5)	−2.5 (27.5)	5.2 (41.4)
Record low °C (°F)	−23.0 (−9.4)	−22.4 (−8.3)	−21.4 (−6.5)	−5.3 (22.5)	−1.8 (28.8)	2.2 (36.0)	4.5 (40.1)	4.5 (40.1)	−1.7 (28.9)	−1.6 (29.1)	−14.1 (6.6)	−21.0 (−5.8)	−23.0 (−9.4)
Average precipitation mm (inches)	33.9 (1.33)	34.0 (1.34)	26.6 (1.05)	38.8 (1.53)	55.3 (2.18)	60.8 (2.39)	50.7 (2.00)	37.0 (1.46)	38.9 (1.53)	32.2 (1.27)	53.7 (2.11)	39.8 (1.57)	521.7 (20.54)
Average precipitation days (≥ 1.0 mm)	6.9	6.4	5.9	6.4	8.3	8.3	7.1	6.8	5.6	5.0	7.8	7.5	82.0
Average relative humidity (%)	83	79	72	65	66	68	66	69	74	76	82	85	74
Mean monthly sunshine hours	61.9	85.0	134.3	178.8	229.0	237.4	259.4	236.8	184.3	143.7	69.1	51.6	1,871.3
Source: NOAA OGIMET

== Biodiversity ==
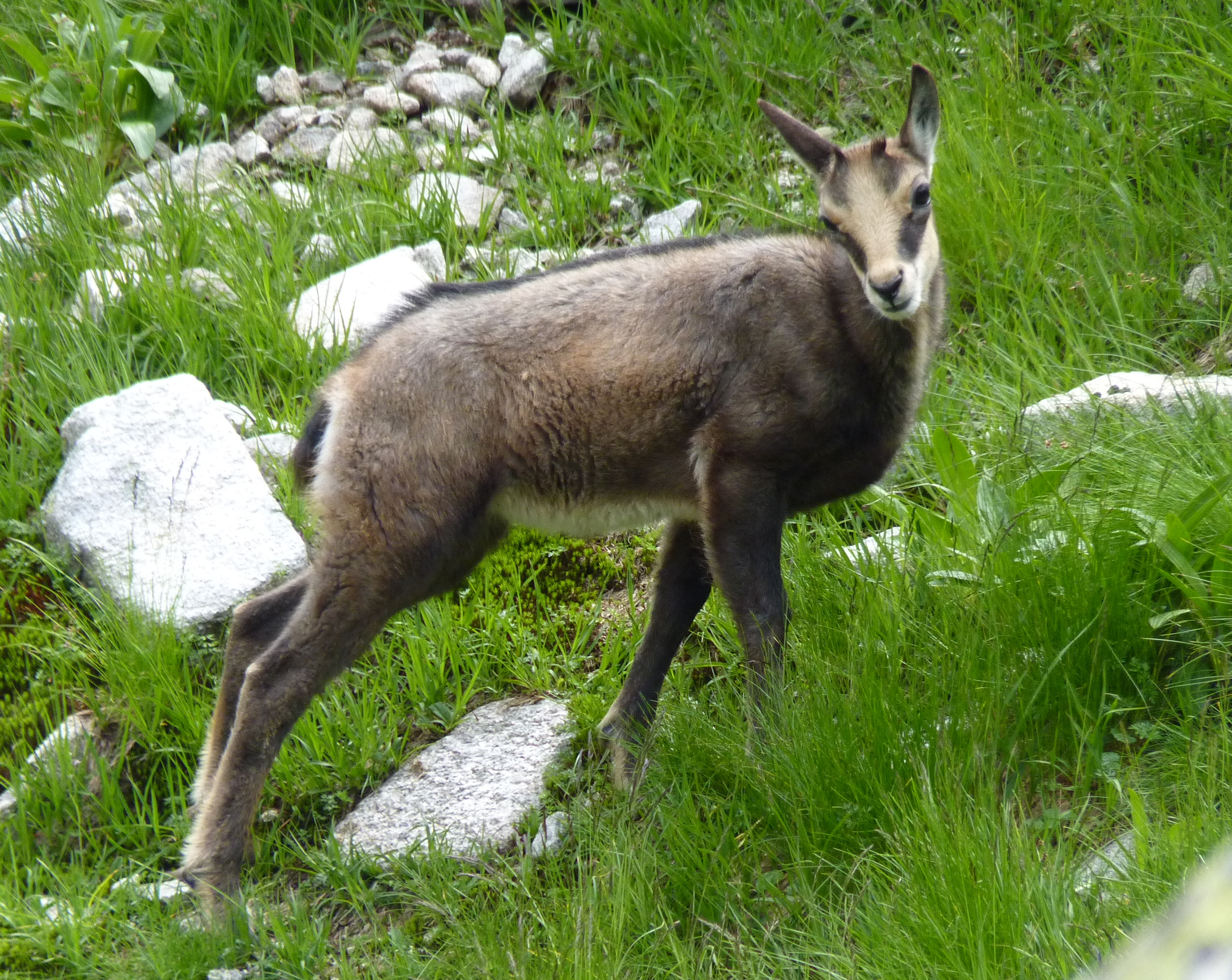
Rupicapra rupicapra tatrica in the Tatra Mountains

Slovakia signed the Rio Convention on Biological Diversity on 19 May 1993, and became a party to the convention on 25 August 1994. It has subsequently produced a National Biodiversity Strategy and Action Plan, which was received by the convention on 2 November 1998.

The biodiversity of Slovakia comprises animals (such as annelids, arthropods, molluscs, nematodes and vertebrates), fungi (Ascomycota, Basidiomycota, Chytridiomycota, Glomeromycota and Zygomycota), micro-organisms (including Mycetozoa), and plants. The geographical position of Slovakia determines the richness of the diversity of fauna and flora. More than 11,000 plant species have been described throughout its territory, nearly 29,000 animal species and over 1,000 species of protozoa. Endemic biodiversity is also common.

Slovakia is located in the biome of temperate broadleaf and mixed forests and terrestrial ecoregions of Pannonian mixed forests and Carpathian montane conifer forests. As the altitude changes, the vegetation associations and animal communities are forming height levels (oak, beech, spruce, scrub pine, alpine meadows and subsoil). Forests cover 44% of the territory of Slovakia. The country had a 2019 Forest Landscape Integrity Index mean score of 4.34/10, ranking it 129th globally out of 172 countries. In terms of forest stands, 60% are broadleaf trees and 40% are coniferous trees. The occurrence of animal species is strongly connected to the appropriate types of plant associations and biotopes.

Over 4,000 species of fungi have been recorded from Slovakia. Of these, nearly 1,500 are lichen-forming species. Some of these fungi are undoubtedly endemic, but not enough is known to say how many. Of the lichen-forming species, about 40% have been classified as threatened in some way. About 7% are apparently extinct, 9% endangered, 17% vulnerable, and 7% rare. The conservation status of non-lichen-forming fungi in Slovakia is not well documented, but there is a red list for its larger fungi.

== Lakes ==
- Lakes of Slovakia
- Baňur
- Hlboké
