= Volovec =

Volovec may refer to:

- Volovec (Tatra), a peak (2.063 m) in the Western Tatras, at the border of Slovakia and Poland
- Volovec (Volovec), a peak (1.284 m) in the Volovec Mountains, eastern Slovakia
- Volovec Mountains, a mountain range in eastern Slovakia
- Volovec (stream), a mountain stream in Low Tatras
- Volovec, a village in western Ukraine
