= Stolica Mountains =

Mountain range in Slovakia

Coordinates: 48°37′30″N 19°54′50″E

The Stolica Mountains (in red) on a map of the Inner Western Carpathians

The Stolica Mountains (Slovak: Stolické vrchy) is a mountain range in Slovakia, the highest part of the Slovak Ore Mountains of the Inner Western Carpathians.

The Stolica Mountains are divided into four distinct morphological sub-assemblies:

- Stolica
- Tŕstie
- Klenovské vrchy
- Málinské vrchy

The highest point of the Stolica Mountains is Stolica (1,476 metres above sea level). The northern slopes of the Stolica is the source of the Sajó River. The entire range is next to the Muránska planina National Park and the Slovak Paradise National Park.
