= Dedinky =

- Municipality
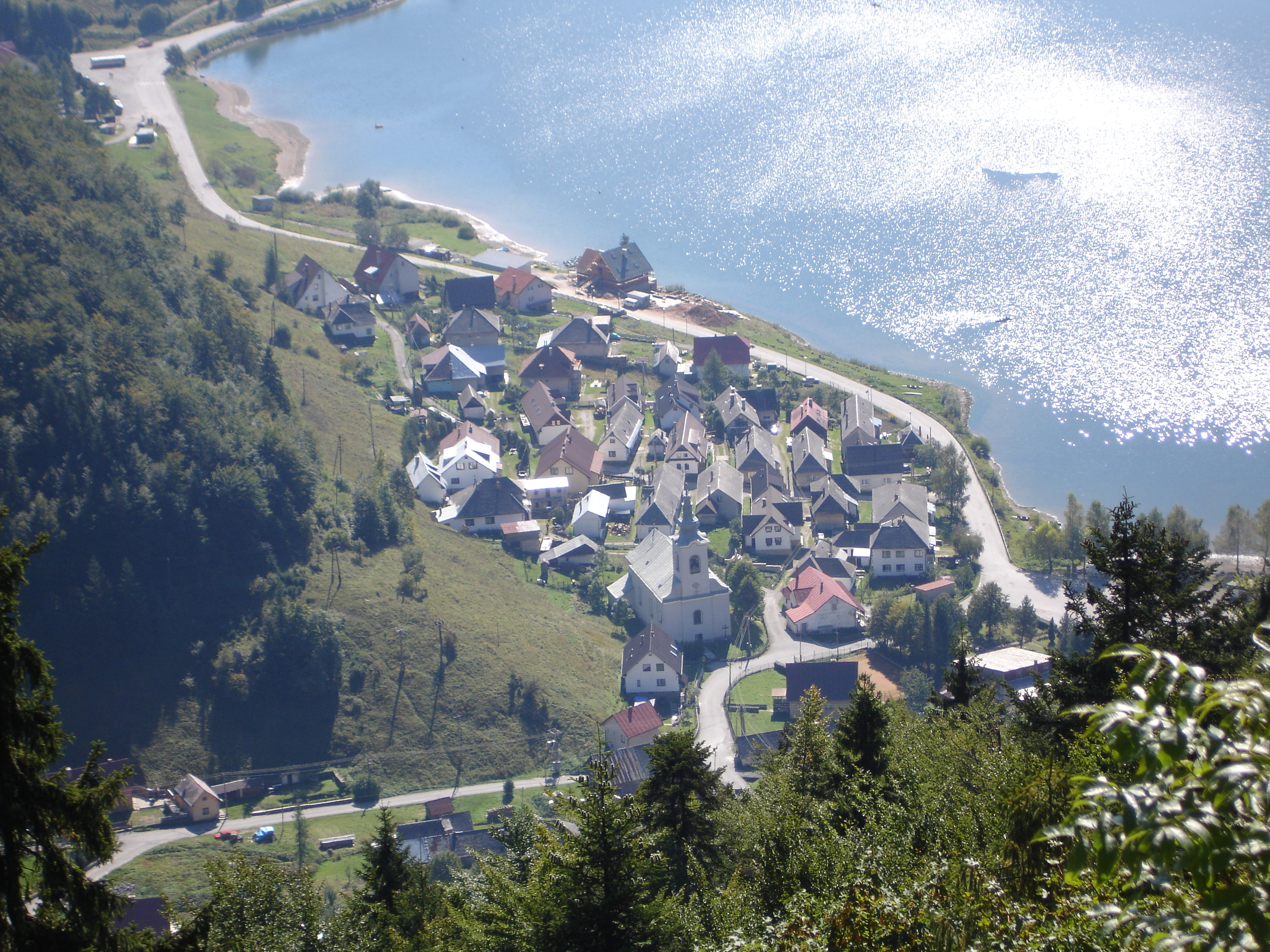

- Flag

- Location of Dedinky in the Košice Region Location of Dedinky in Slovakia
- Coordinates: 48.87°N 20.38°E
- Country: Slovakia
- Region: Košice Region
- District: Rožňava District
- First mentioned: 1386

Area
  - Total: 3.64 km^{2} (1.41 sq mi)
- Elevation: 784 m (2,572 ft)

Population (2025)
  - Total: 224
- Time zone: UTC+1 (CET)
  - Summer (DST): UTC+2 (CEST)
- Postal code: 497 3
- Area code: +421 58
- Vehicle registration plate (until 2022): RV
- Website: www.dedinky.eu

Dedinky (Hungarian: Imrikfalva, German: Dörfel in der Zips) is a village and municipality in the Rožňava District in the Košice Region of eastern Slovakia.

== History ==
In historical records the village was first mentioned in 1386. Before the establishment of independent Czechoslovakia in 1918, Dedinky was part of Szepes County within the Kingdom of Hungary. From 1939 to 1945, it was part of the Slovak Republic.

== Geography ==
The municipality lies at an altitude of 784 metres (2,572 ft) and covers an area of 3.64 km^{2} (1.41 sq mi) (2025).

== Population ==
Population statistic (10 years)
Year	1995	2005	2015	2025
Count	418	306	270	224
Difference		−26.79%	−11.76%	−17.03%

Population statistic
Year	2024	2025
Count	224	224
Difference		−1.42%

It has a population of 224 people (31 December 2025).

=== Ethnicity ===
Census 2021 (1+ %)
Ethnicity	Number	Fraction
Slovak	236	99.57%
Total	237	

In year 2021 was 237 people by ethnicity 236 as Slovak, 2 as Hungarian, 1 as Czech and 1 as Polish.

Note on population: The difference values of population numbers in the table "Population statistic" and in the sections "Ethnicity" & "Religion" is caused by the use of various statistical methods.

=== Religion ===
Census 2021 (1+ %)
Religion	Number	Fraction
Roman Catholic Church	121	51.05%
None	96	40.51%
Evangelical Church	13	5.49%
Total	237	

In year 2021 was 237 people by religion 121 from Roman Catholic Church, 96 from None, 13 from Evangelical Church, 2 from Other, 2 from Greek Catholic Church, 1 from Eastern Orthodox Church, 1 from Paganism and natural spirituality and 1 from Buddhism.

== Culture ==
The village has a small public library and a football pitch.

== Genealogical resources ==
The records for genealogical research are available at the state archive "Statny Archiv in Kosice, Slovakia"

== See also ==
- List of municipalities and towns in Slovakia
