= Spiš-Gemer Karst =

Coordinates: 48°55′N 20°23′E

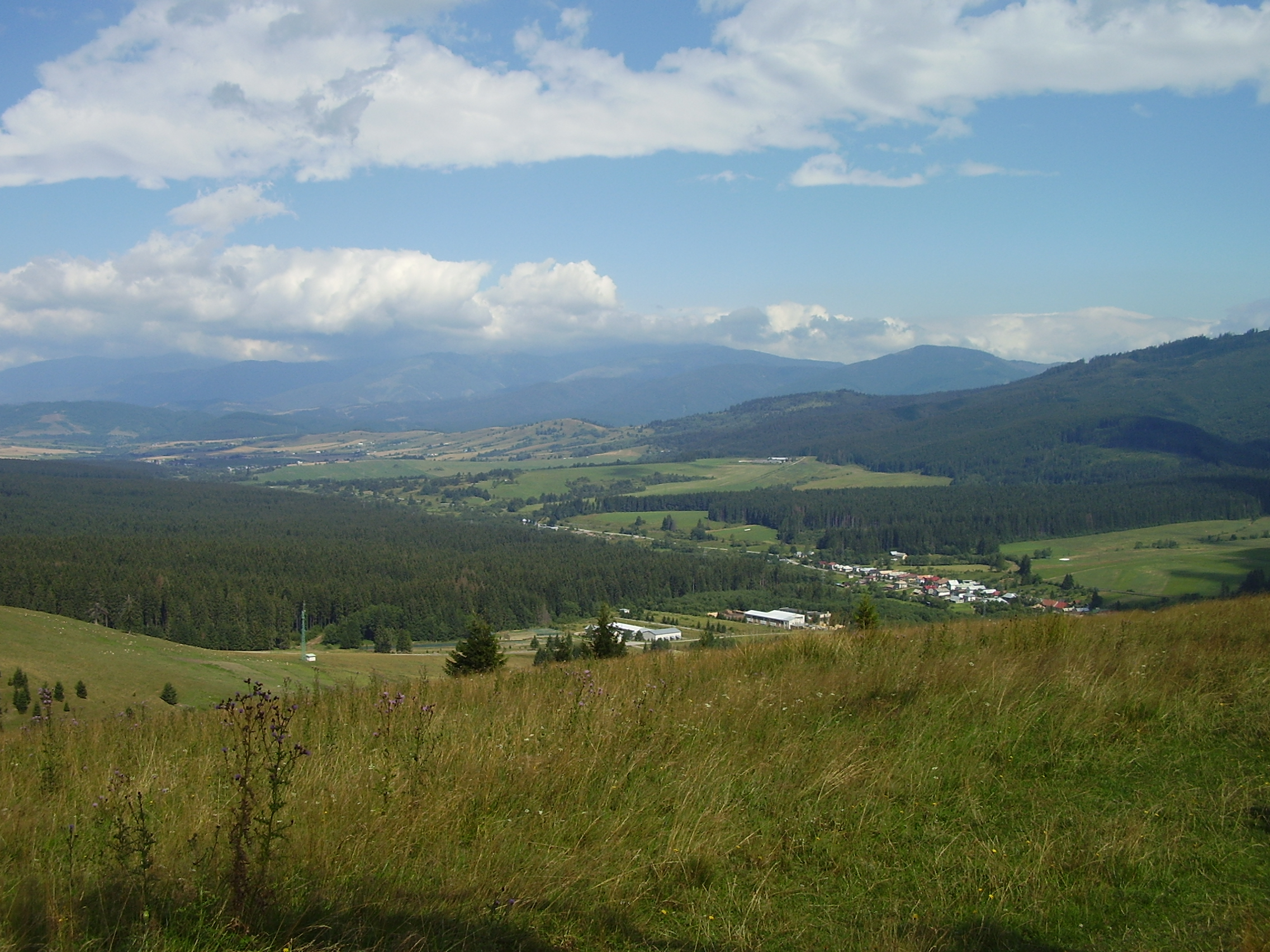
Muránska plain

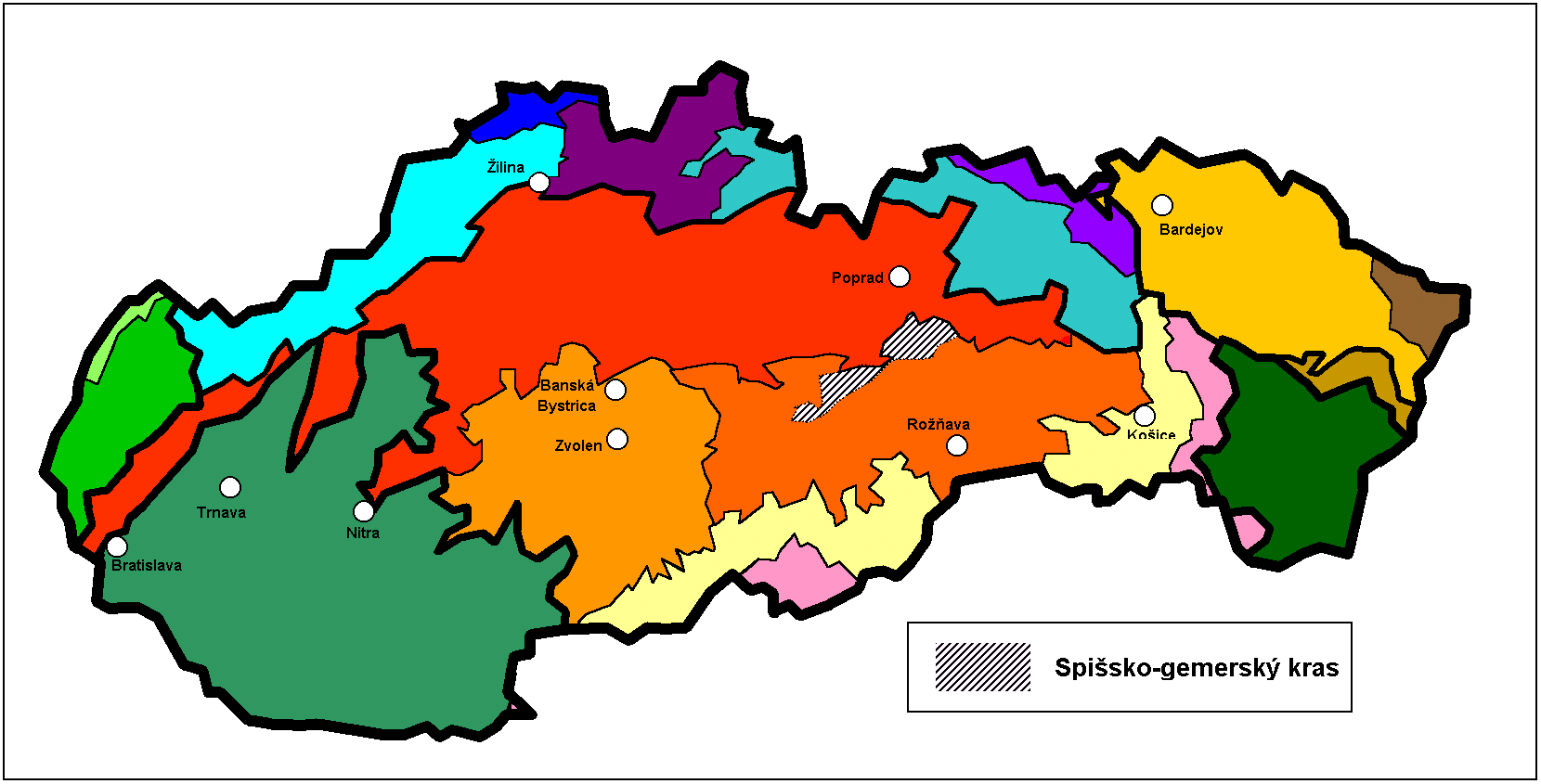
Location of Spiš-Gemer Karst in Slovakia (in gray)

The Spiš-Gemer Karst (Slovak: Spišsko-gemerský kras, Hungarian: Szepes-gömöri karszt) is a part (a geomorphological area) in the Slovenské rudohorie Mountains.

It consists of these two entities, both of which have been declared national parks:

- Slovak Paradise mountains
- Muránska planina (Muráň Plateau)

It is made up of a complex of karst plains and high plateaus ranging from 800 to 1000 above sea level.
