= Mountain Rescue Service (Slovakia) =

Mountain Rescue Service of Slovakia
- Common name: Mountain Rescue Service
- Abbreviation: HZS

Agency overview
- Formed: 1954

Jurisdictional structure
- Constituting instrument: Constitution and General Regulations

Operational structure
- Headquarters: Horný Smokovec č.52, 062 01 Vysoké Tatry, Starý Smokovec, Slovakia

Website
- http://www.hzs.sk/

The Mountain Rescue Service (Horská záchranná služba, HZS) of Slovakia provides nationwide Mountain Rescue operations and Search and Rescue operations in difficult terrains in close cooperations with the Air Rescue Service. It is a part of the integrated rescue system in Slovakia.

== History ==
The Mountain Rescue Service of Slovakia was officially founded as a nationwide (at that time Czechoslovakia) emergency service on December 1, 1954, although the history of mountain rescue dates more than 200 years back. It was reformed in the year 2003 by law number 544/2002, effective from January 1, 2003, which moved the Mountain Rescue Service to the scope of the Ministry of Interior of the Slovak Republic.

== Structure ==
There are 6 main districts of the service in Slovakia:

- High Tatras - includes resorts of High Tatras and other
- Low Tatras - includes resorts in Jasná - Demänovská dolina, Donovaly and other
- Western Tatras
- Greater Fatra
- Lesser Fatra
- Slovak Paradise

== Center for Avalanche Prevention ==
The Mountain Rescue Service is also the operator of the national center for avalanche prevention, which monitors the situation in all regions and issues avalanche warnings and other counter-measures, including controlled avalanche triggering by explosive detonations and other. The Center for Avalanche Protection runs its own Avalanche Information System and an online portal, where mountaingoers can check the current situation.

== Insurance and user pays ==
In 2006, a user pays pricing policy was appointed by law, under which mountaingoers (both domestic and foreigners) are required to pay for the cost of their rescue. This effectively forced mountaingoers to take out a special kind of insurance, which covers the costs for the rescue in case of an emergency. The costs of a rescue need to be covered even if visitors get into an emergency situation staying on marked official paths. Exception of this policy are EMS and medical transports (including by helicopter) resulting from accidents on marked ski slopes in skiing resorts, which are covered by common health insurances. Search and Rescue operations are not covered by common health insurances.

== International cooperation ==
The Service has a cooperation agreement with its Polish counterpart (TOPR) in the Tatra Mountain, which lies on the border of both countries.
