= Slovak Ore Mountains =

Mountain range in Slovakia

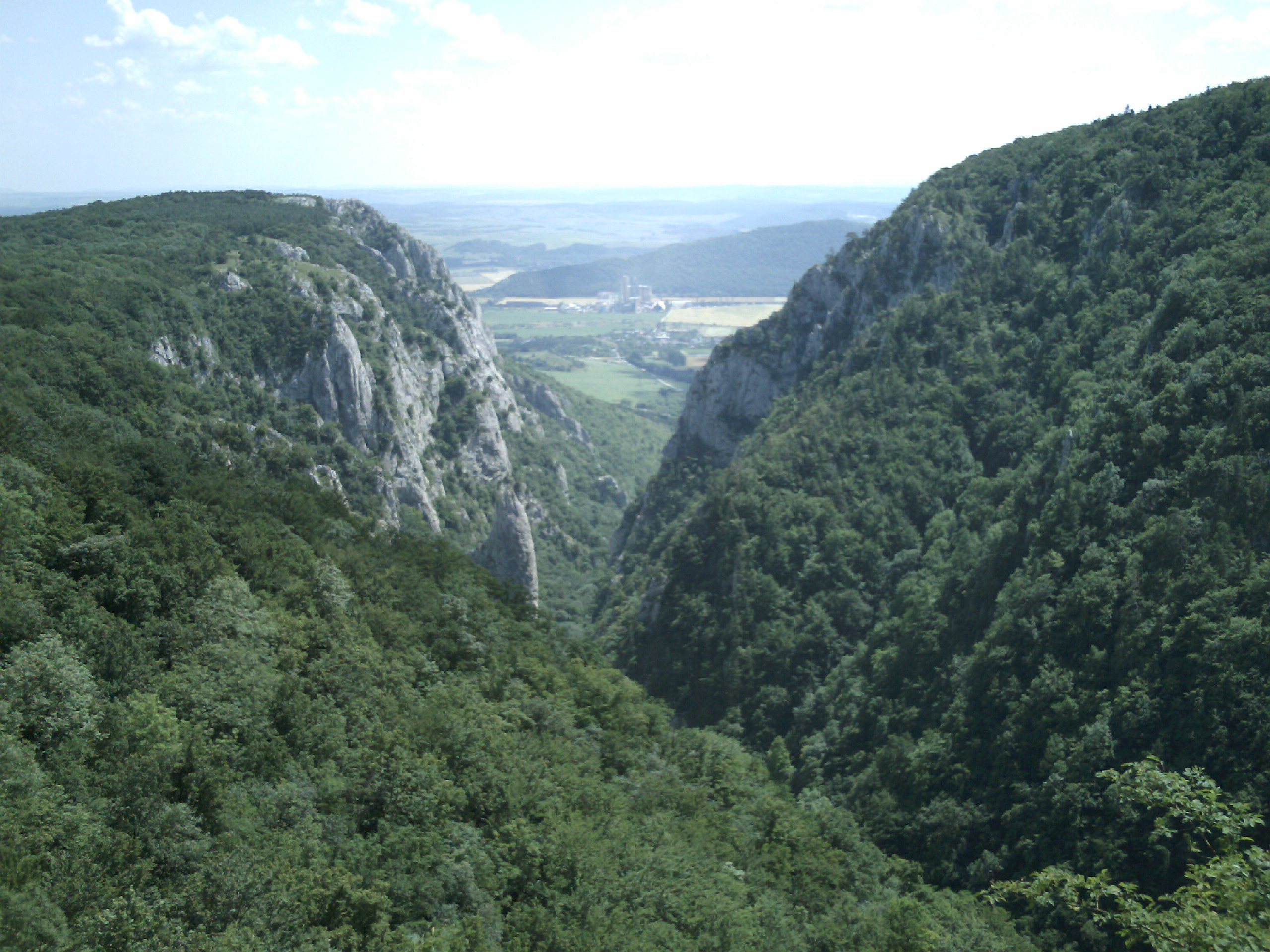
- Zadiel canyon in the Slovak Karst

Highest point
- Peak: Stolica
- Elevation: 1,476 m (4,843 ft)

Geography
- Location within Slovakia
- Country: Slovakia
- Range coordinates: 48°45′00″N 20°15′00″E
- Parent range: Inner Western Carpathians

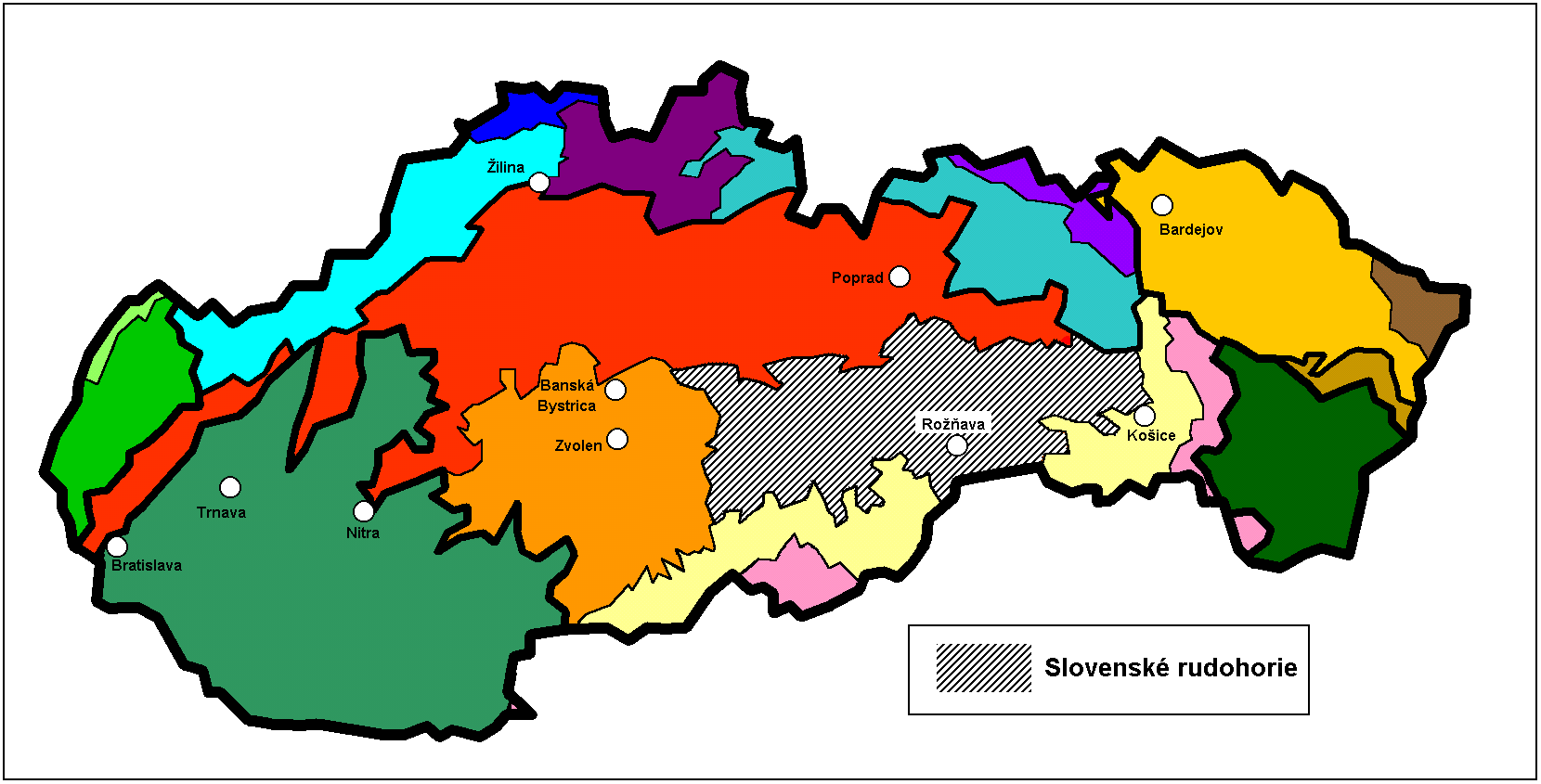
The Slovak Ore Mountains in Slovakia

The Slovak Ore Mountains (Slovak: Slovenské rudohorie [ˈslɔʋenskeː ˈrudɔɦɔrɪe], Hungarian: Gömör–Szepesi-érchegység, German: Slowakisches Erzgebirge or Zips-Gemer-Erzgebirge) are an extensive mountain range within the Carpathian Mountains, located mostly in Slovakia's Spiš and Gemer region, with a small part in northern Hungary. It is the largest mountain range in Slovakia. Geomorphologically, the Slovak Ore Mountains belong to the Inner Western Carpathians.

The mountains are bordered by Zvolen in the west, Košice in the east, the rivers Hron and Hornád in the north, and the Juhoslovenská kotlina and Košice Basin (Košická kotlina) in the south. The region includes the Domica Cave (jaskyňa Domica), one of the largest caves in Europe, Zádiel canyon and Krásna Hôrka Castle.

== Subdivision ==
Geomorphologically, the Slovak Ore Mountains are grouped within the Inner Western Carpathians. The mountains do not have a central ridge - they consist of several independent sections, geomorphological regions:

- Vepor Mountains (Veporské vrchy)
- Spiš-Gemer Karst (Spišsko-gemerský kras)
- Stolica Mountains (Stolické vrchy)
- Revúca Highlands (Revúcka vrchovina)
- Volovec Mountains (Volovské vrchy)
- Black Mountain (Čierna hora)
- Rožňava Basin (Rožňavská kotlina)
- Slovak Karst (Slovenský kras) and Aggtelek Karst (Hungarian: Aggteleki-karszt; lies in northern Hungary)

== Characteristics ==
Basic data:

- highest peak: Stolica, 1,476 m AMSL
- length: c.140 kilometres (87 mi)
- width: c.40 kilometres (25 mi)
- area: c.4,000 square kilometres (1,500 sq mi)

Since this is a very extensive geomorphological unit, no general characterization is appropriate. The geomorphological structure is varied and has crystalline, Mesozoic and volcanic rocks.

The mountains were, as the name suggests, heavily mined but activity died out during the 19th century. There is evidence of copper mining since at least the Early Bronze Age. which grew in importance during the early modern period. Deposits included ores of copper, lead, silver, gold, zinc and some iron. From 1494 one of the first multinational corporations was set up by the Thurzó and Fugger families to take advantage of the region's valuable economic resources.

The towns of Banská Bystrica, Špania Dolina and Ľubietová were important centers of mining: in 1692, the first modern blast furnace in the Kingdom of Hungary was built in Ľubietová.

== Protected areas ==
Slovenské rudohorie contains the Muránska planina National Park, Slovak Karst National Park and Slovak Paradise National Park.
