= Volovec Mountains =

Mountain range in Slovakia

Coordinates: 48°44′N 20°44′E

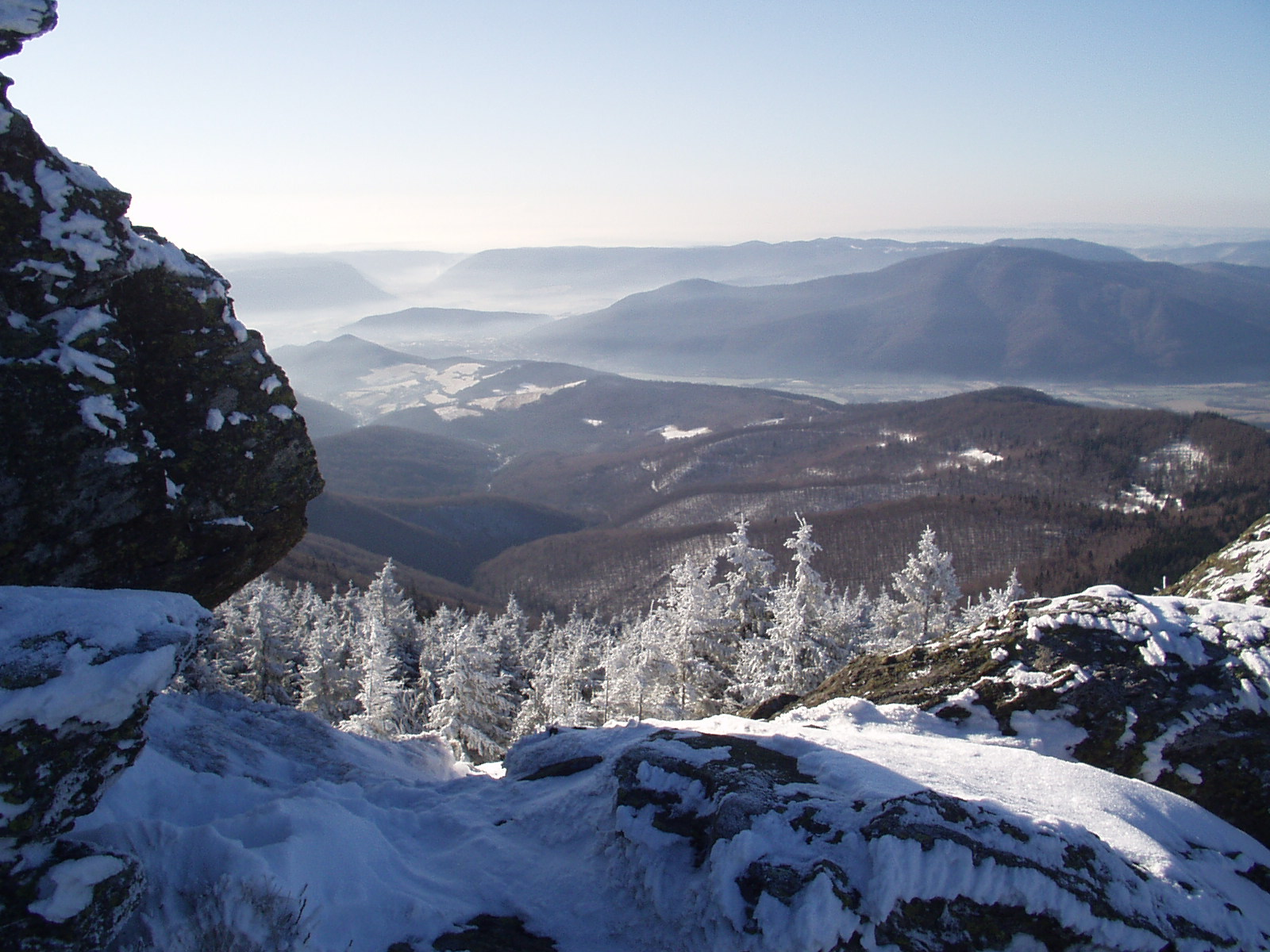
Volovec Mountain winter vista

map with Volovec Mountains marked in red

The Volovec Mountains (Slovak: Volovské vrchy, pronounced [ˈʋɔlɔwskeː ˈʋr̩xi]) is a mountain range in eastern Slovakia, the largest range within the group of Slovak Ore Mountains, which is part of the Inner Western Carpathians.

The range is about 70 kilometers by 30 kilometers, with ridges usually 800 to 1100 meters high. The highest peak is Zlatý stôl ("Golden Table"; 1322 meters). The range is almost completely forested, mostly with spruce and fir, and isolated stands of beech and oak. A large portion of the range is set aside as a bird sanctuary. The mountain range is the second largest range in Slovakia after the Tatra Mountains, but the third-largest range in the Carpathians.

The range contains old mining towns such as Gelnica, Rudňany, and Smolník, where gold, silver, copper, mercury and iron were exploited.
