= Tourism in Slovakia =

Tourism in Slovakia offers natural landscapes, mountains, caves, medieval castles and towns, folk architecture, spas and ski resorts.

More than 2.2 million people visited Slovakia in 2024, and the most attractive destinations are the capital of Bratislava and the High Tatras. Most foreign visitors come from the Czech Republic (about 26 percent), Poland (15 percent) and Germany (11 percent). The majority of all visitors are Slovak (60 percent or about three million).

== Statistics ==
Tourist arrivals of 2024 in %

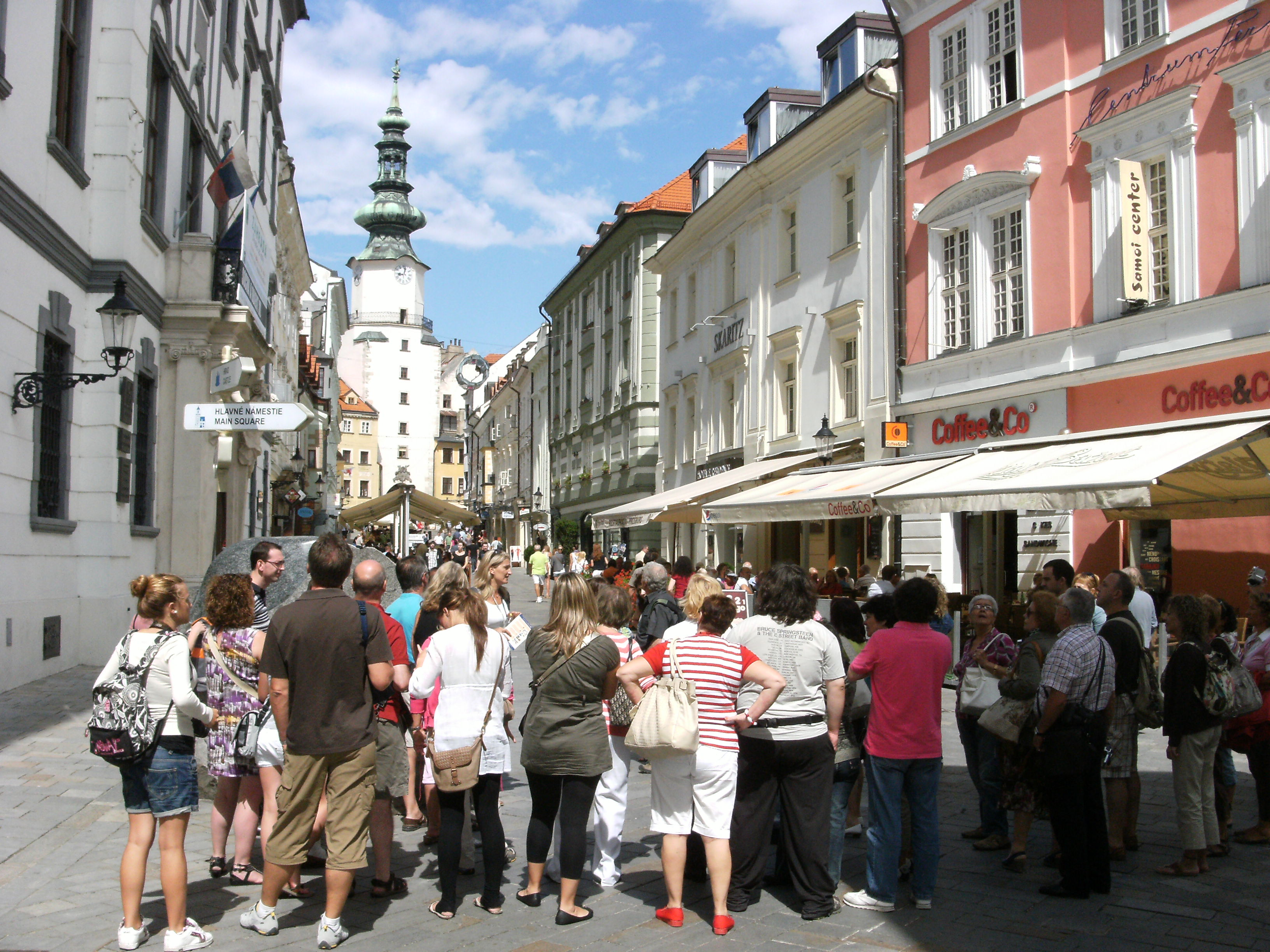
Bratislava, the capital of Slovakia, is also the country's most visited city

Most visitors to Slovakia in who stayed in tourist accommodation establishments come from:

Rank	Country	2015	2016	2017
1	Czech Republic	509,700	621,475	645,195
2	Poland	168,358	188,284	209,524
3	Germany	158,857	178,047	192,328
4	Hungary	69,563	91,175	101,406
5	Austria	81,589	88,123	96,777
6	United Kingdom	64,891	77,837	79,797
7	China	28,154	41,332	61,346
8	Italy	59,294	65,050	59,775
9	Ukraine	51,591	52,850	53,024
10	United States	40,553	45,670	46,728
Total foreign		1,721,193	2,027,009	2,162,384

== Natural environment ==
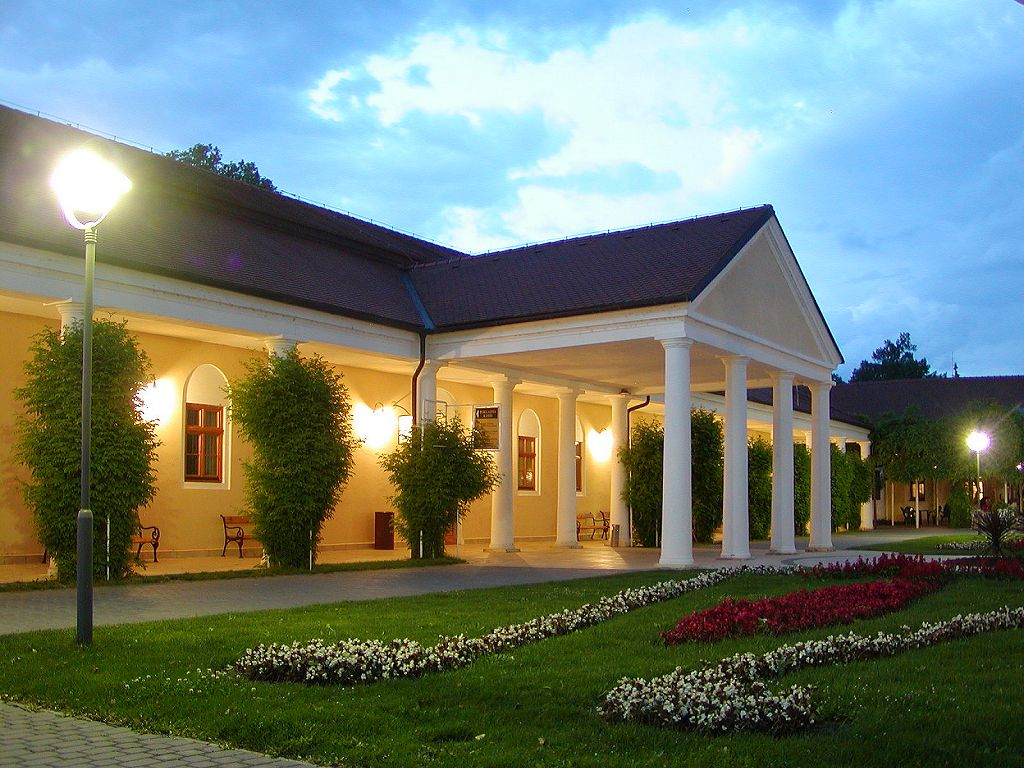
Spa in Piešťany

Some 40% of Slovakia is covered with forests. Slovakia’s forests contain a wide biodiversity and animals include brown bears, wolves, foxes, wild boars, muskrats, chamois and lynxes. Slovakia features a high percentage of wildlife included in protected areas. There are hardly any mountain ranges and areas not under some form of protection.

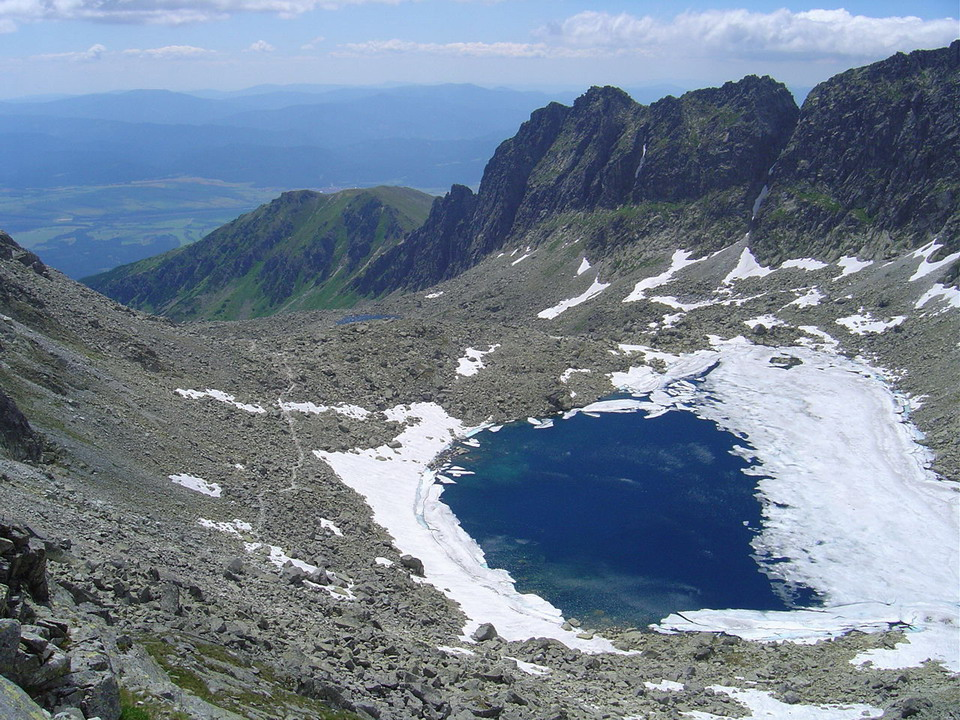
High Tatras are Slovakia's highest mountains.

One of Slovakia's main tourist attractions are the Tatra Mountains, (particularly the High Tatras), the highest part of the Carpathians. They feature many rare plant and animal species and offer numerous skiing, hiking and mountaineering opportunities.

Rivers and streams in the mountains of Slovakia are often used for rafting and other white-water based activities and sports. The use of rafts has a very long tradition and especially rafts on the spectacular Dunajec river are very popular among tourists.

Slovakia contains numerous mineral springs and spas. There were 94 destination spas in 2007, which contained more than 11,900 beds. In 2007, there were 276,200 visitors in Slovak spas, which is a 9% increase from 2006. 35.2% of the visitors were foreign.

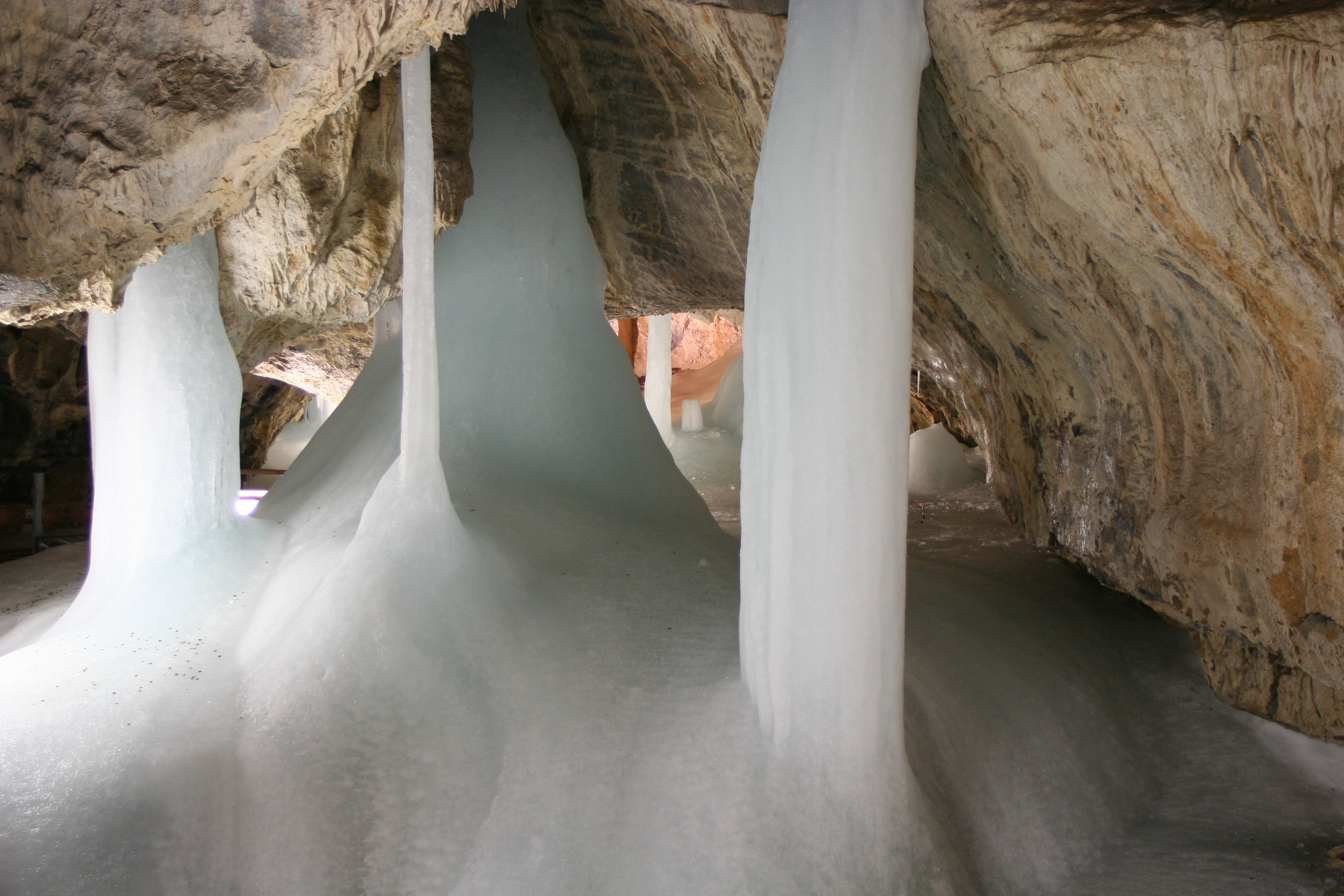
The Demänová Ice Cave has attracted visitors since its discovery in the 13th century.

The spas include:

- Balneological spas: Bojnice, Brusno, Dudince, Lúčky, Piešťany, Sklené Teplice, Sliač, Smrdáky, Trenčianske Teplice, Turčianske Teplice
- Climatic spas: Nový Smokovec, Štós, Štrbské Pleso, Tatranské Matliare, High Tatras
- Mixed spas: Bardejovské Kúpele, Číž, Nimnica, Rajecké Teplice and Vyšné Ružbachy

New water parks are being built throughout the country. Recently built parks include Tatralandia in Liptovský Mikuláš, Aquacity in Poprad and Aquathermal in Senec.

Slovakia's karst areas offer an extremely high number of caves and their list is being expanded every year owing to new discoveries. Eighteen caves are open to the public, the longest of which is 9 km long. Some of them have been proclaimed as UNESCO's World Heritage Sites. Among them, Ochtinská Aragonite Cave is one of three aragonite caves in the world.

== Architecture and landmarks ==
=== Castles ===
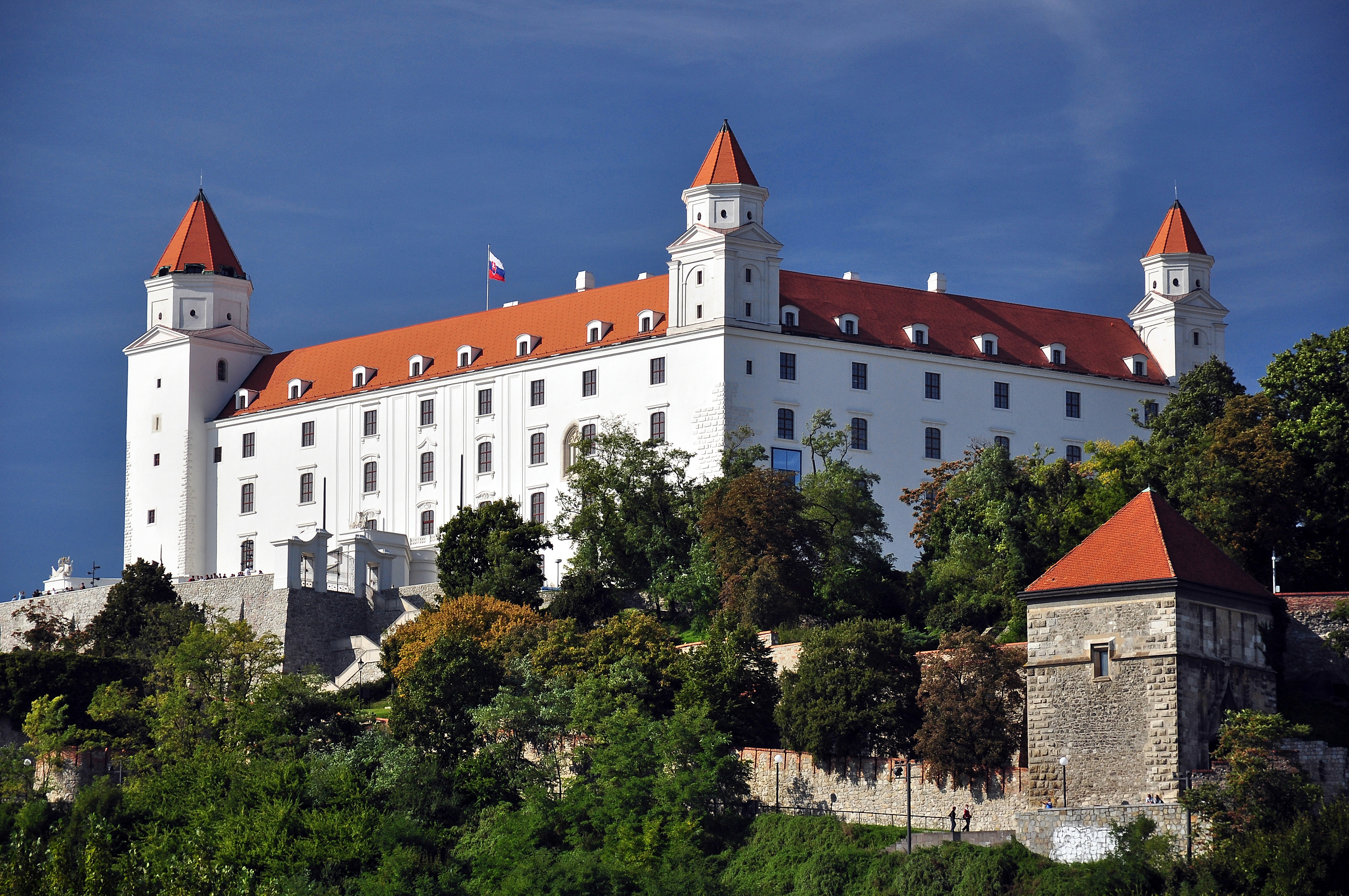
Bratislava Castle

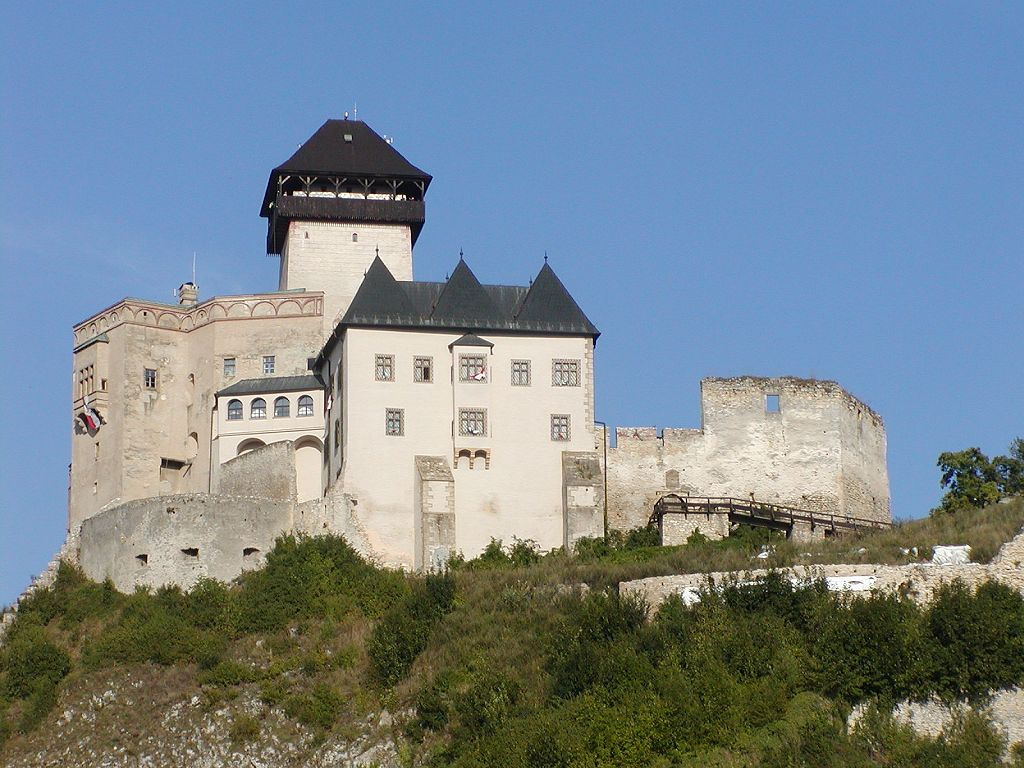
Trenčín Castle

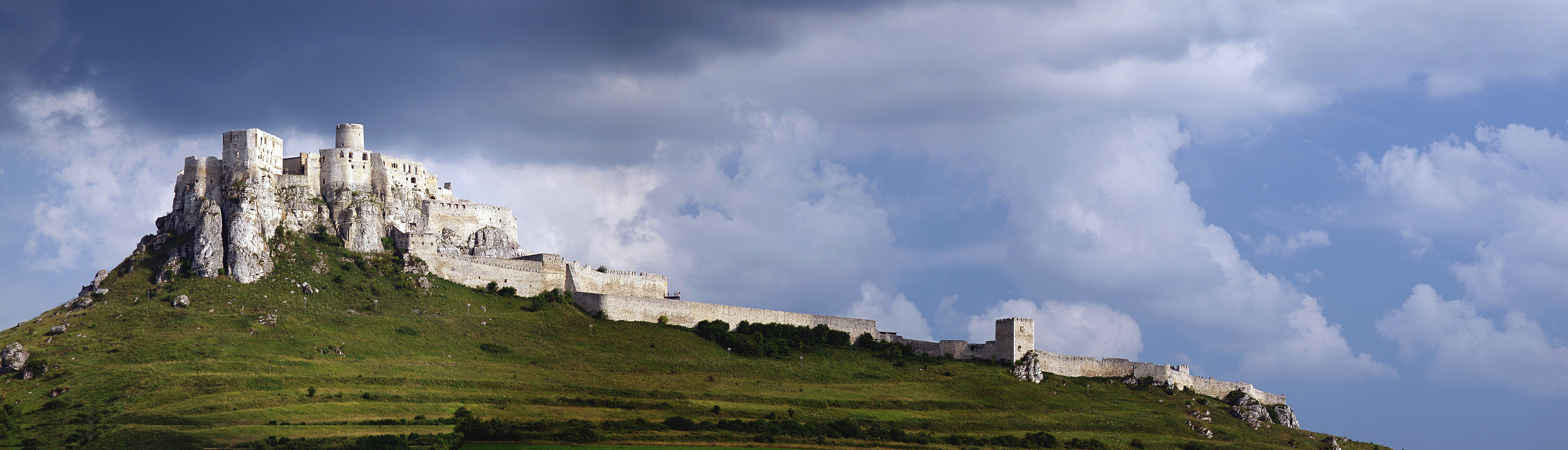
Spiš Castle

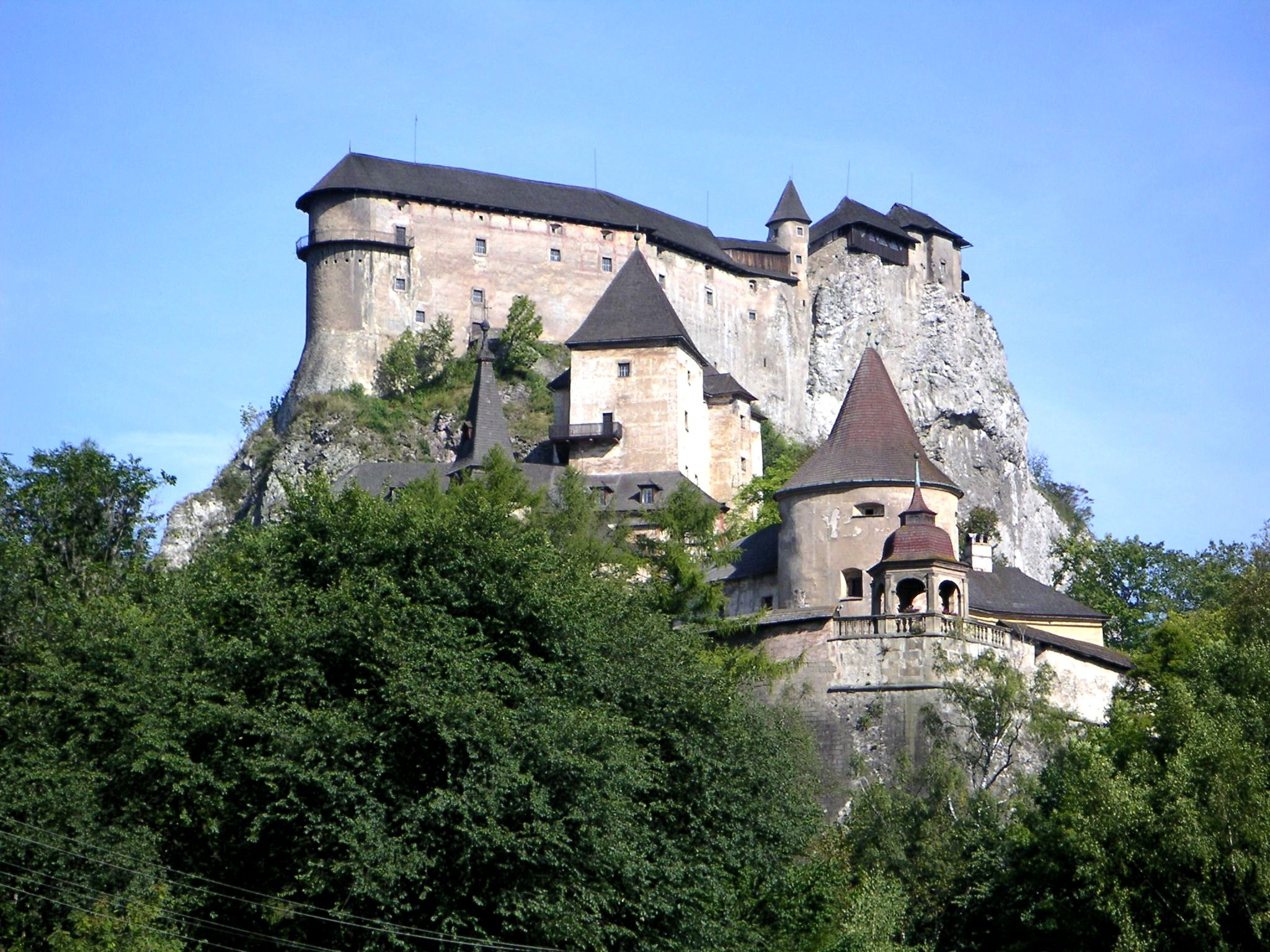
Orava Castle

Slovakia contains many castles, most of which are in ruins. The best known castles include Bojnice Castle (often used as a filming location), Spiš Castle (the largest fortified castle in Europe, on the UNESCO list), Orava Castle, Bratislava Castle, and the ruins of Devín Castle. Čachtice Castle was once the home of the world's most prolific female serial killer, the 'Bloody Lady', Elizabeth Báthory.

=== Historical architecture ===
Slovakia's position in Europe and the country's past (part of the multicultural Kingdom of Hungary, the Habsburg monarchy and Czechoslovakia) made many cities and towns similar to the cities in the Czech Republic (such as Prague), Austria (such as Salzburg) or Hungary (such as Budapest). A historical center with at least one square has been preserved in many towns. Large historical centers can be found in Bratislava, Trenčín, Košice, Banská Štiavnica, Levoča, and Trnava. Historical centers have been going through restoration in recent years.

=== Churches ===
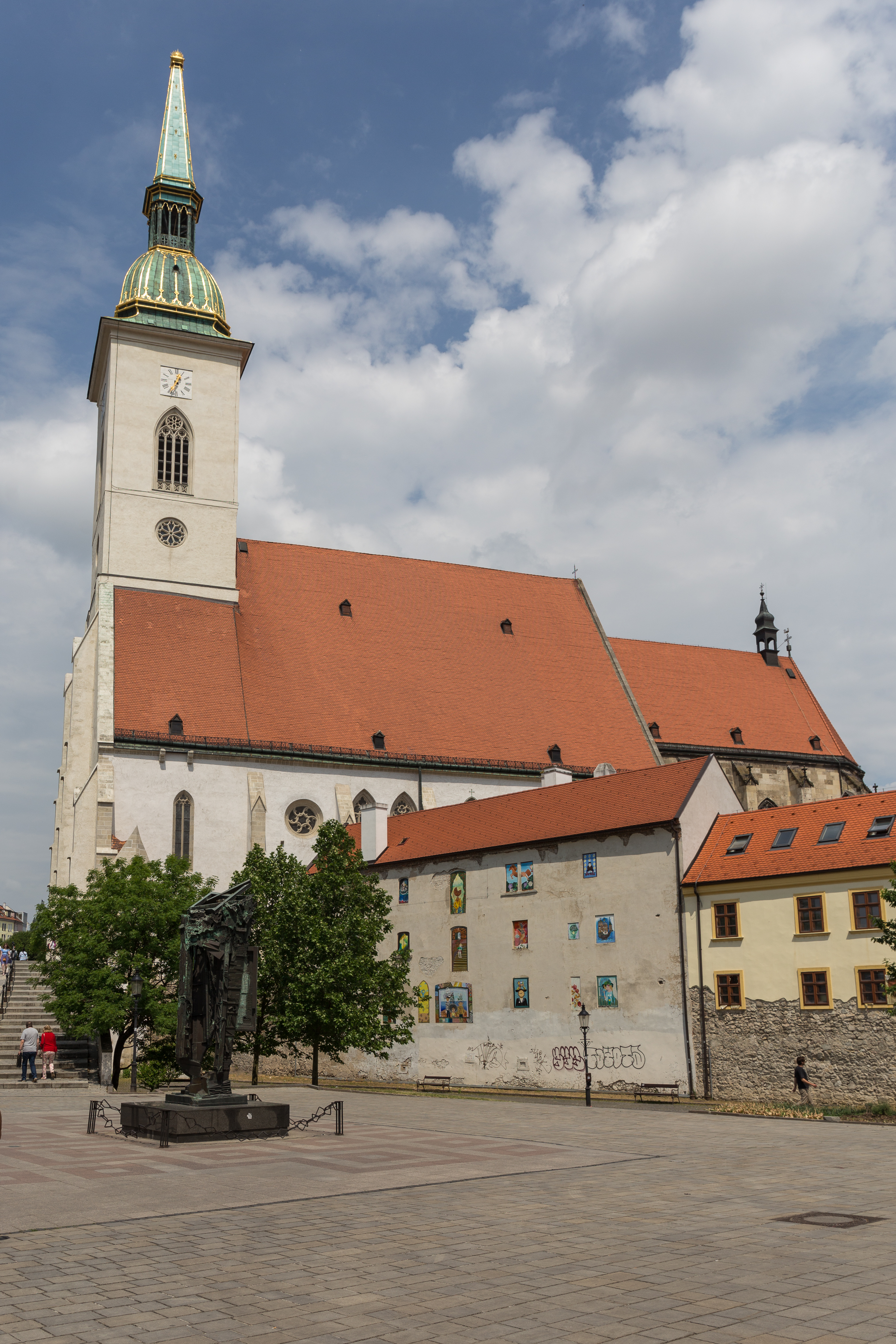
St. Martin's Cathedral in Bratislava

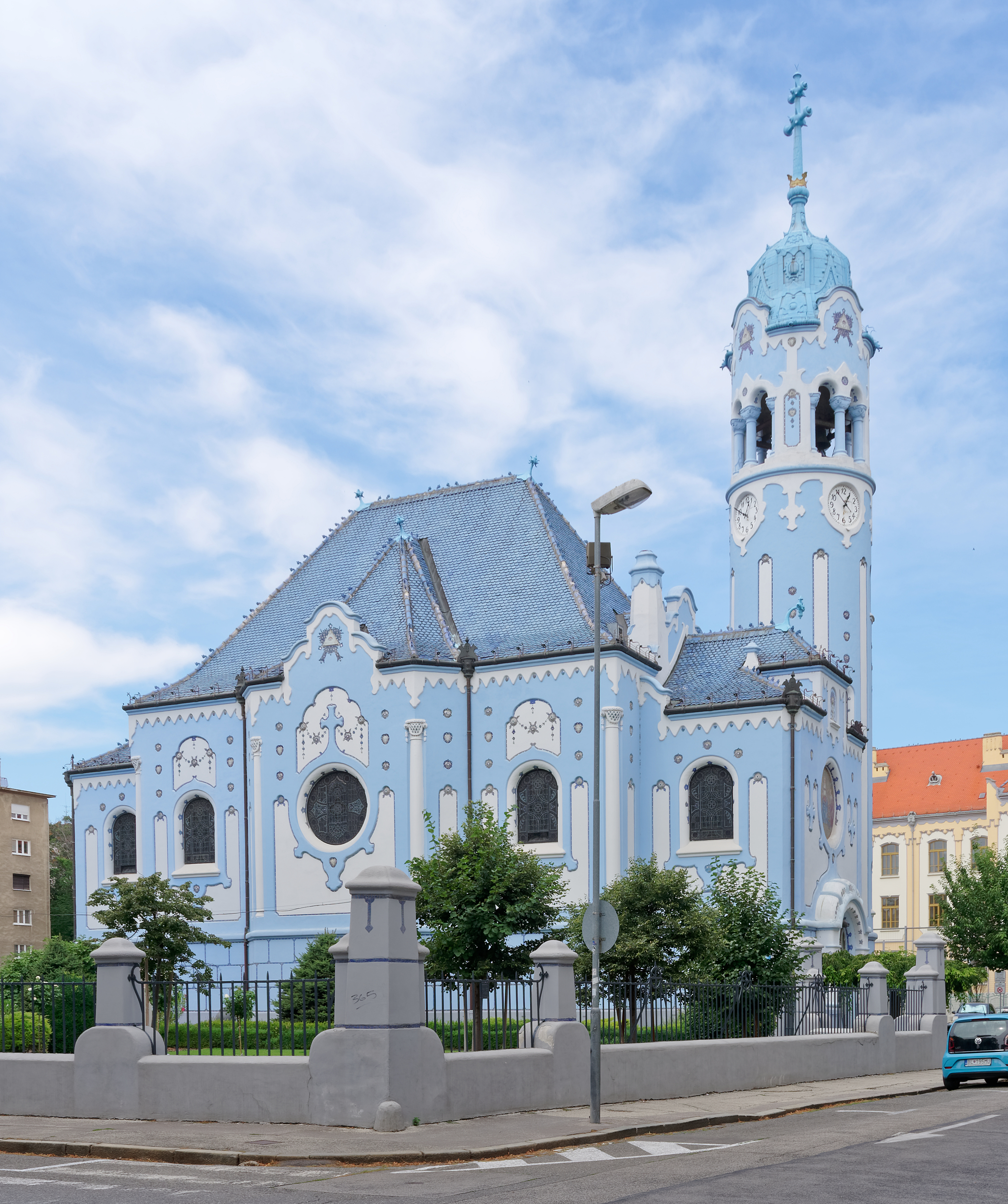
Church of St. Elizabeth in Bratislava

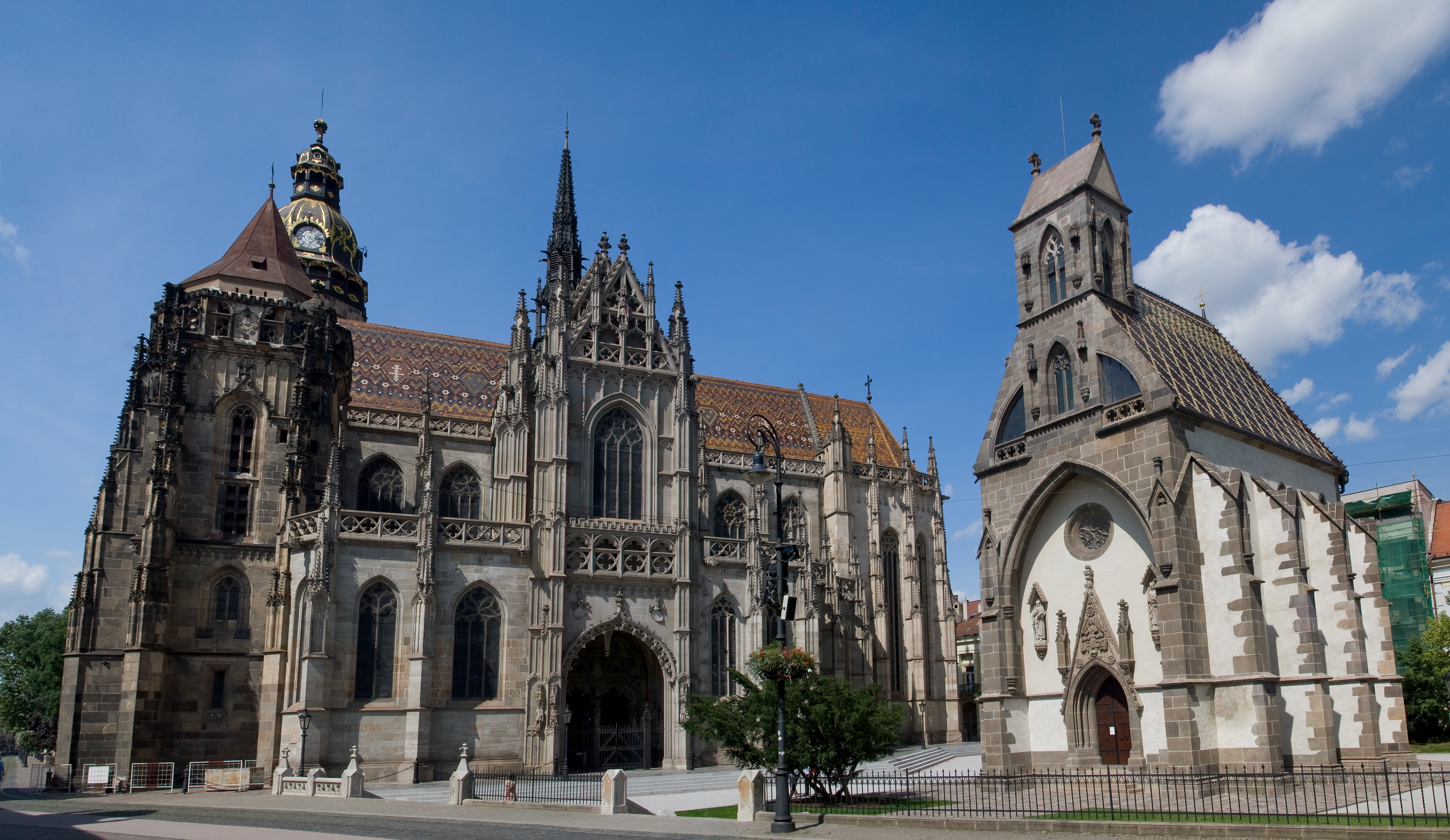
St. Elisabeth Cathedral in Košice is Slovakia's largest church.

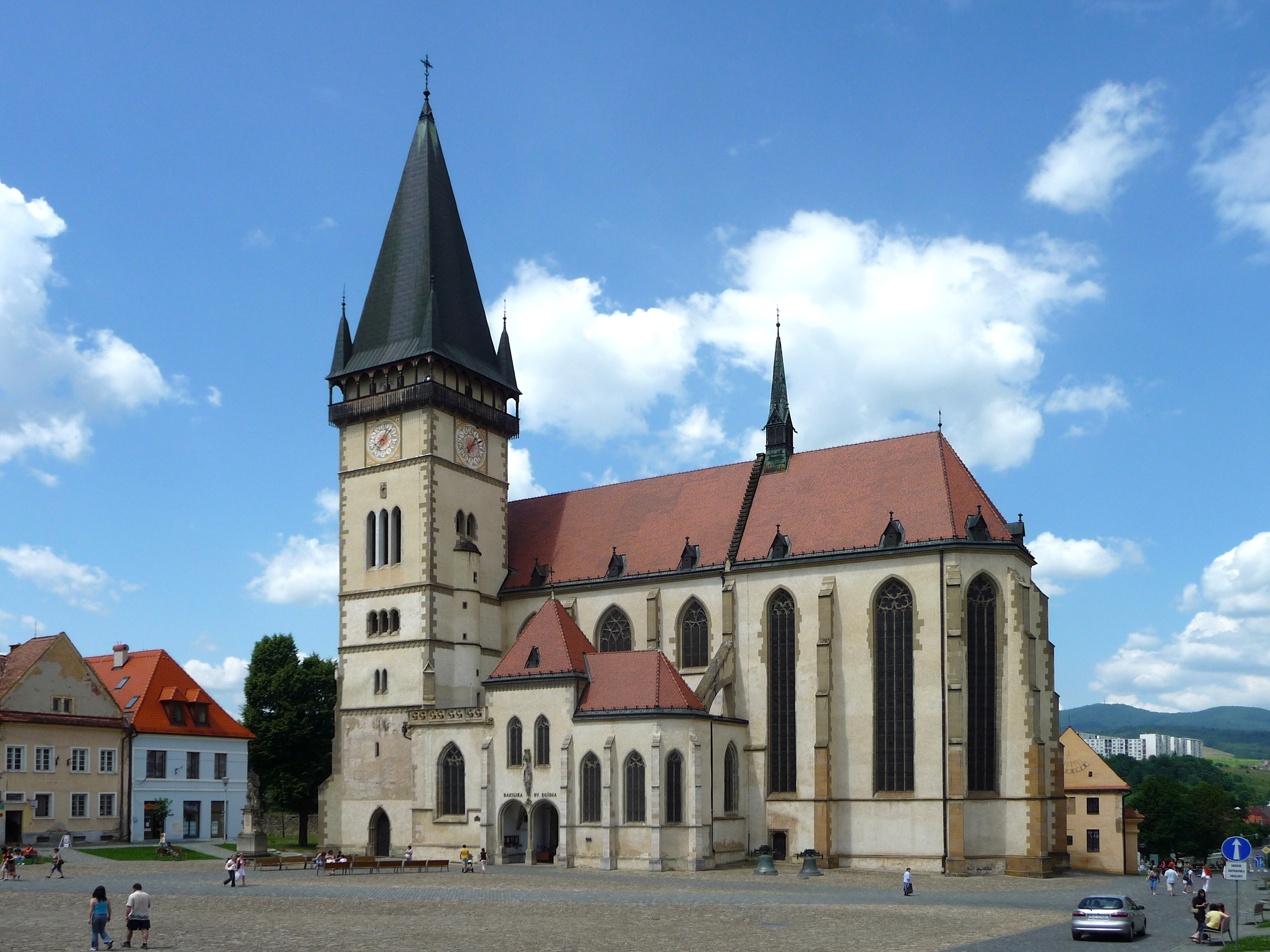
Basilica of St. Giles in Bardejov

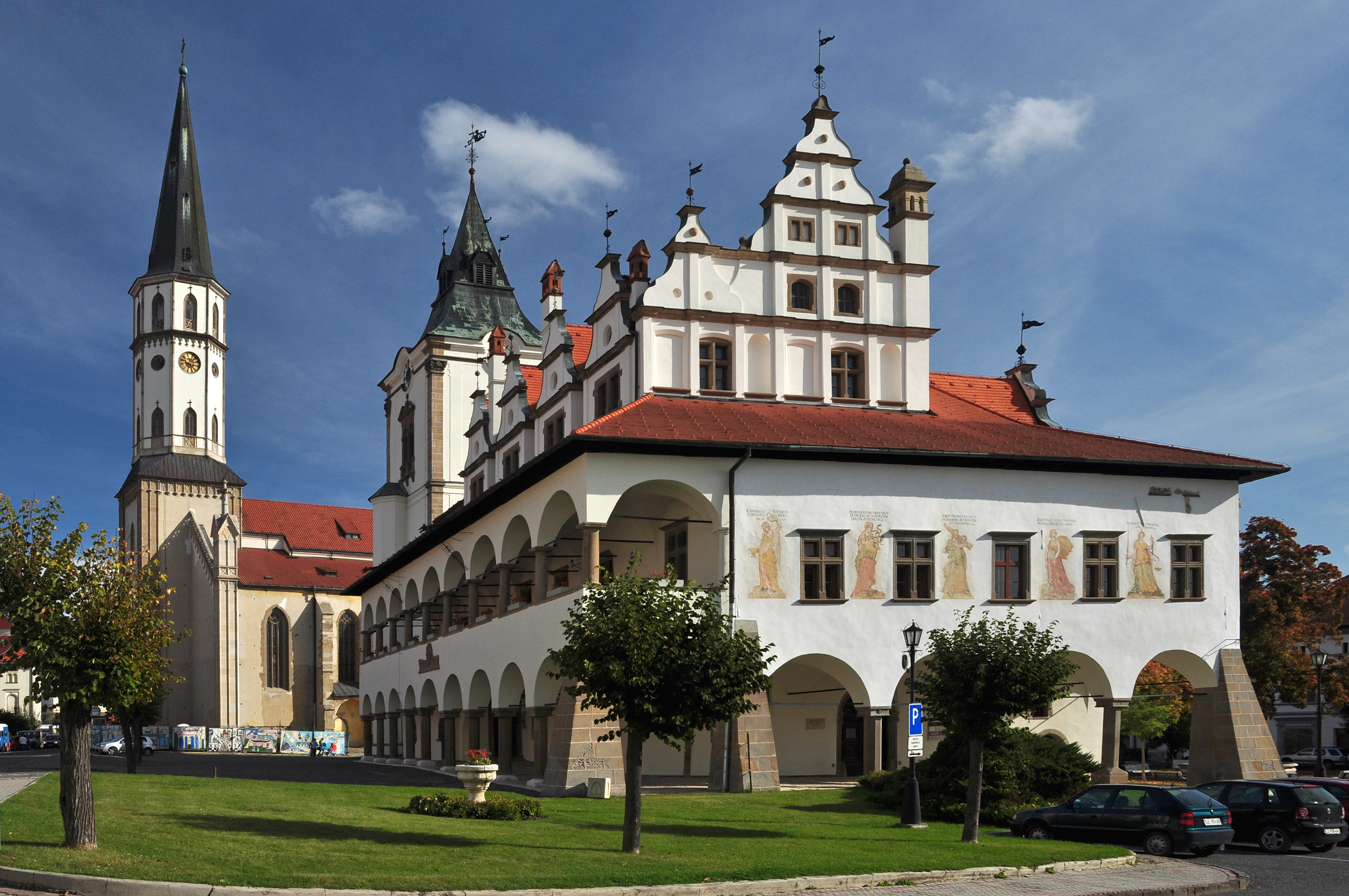
Basilica of St. James in Levoča

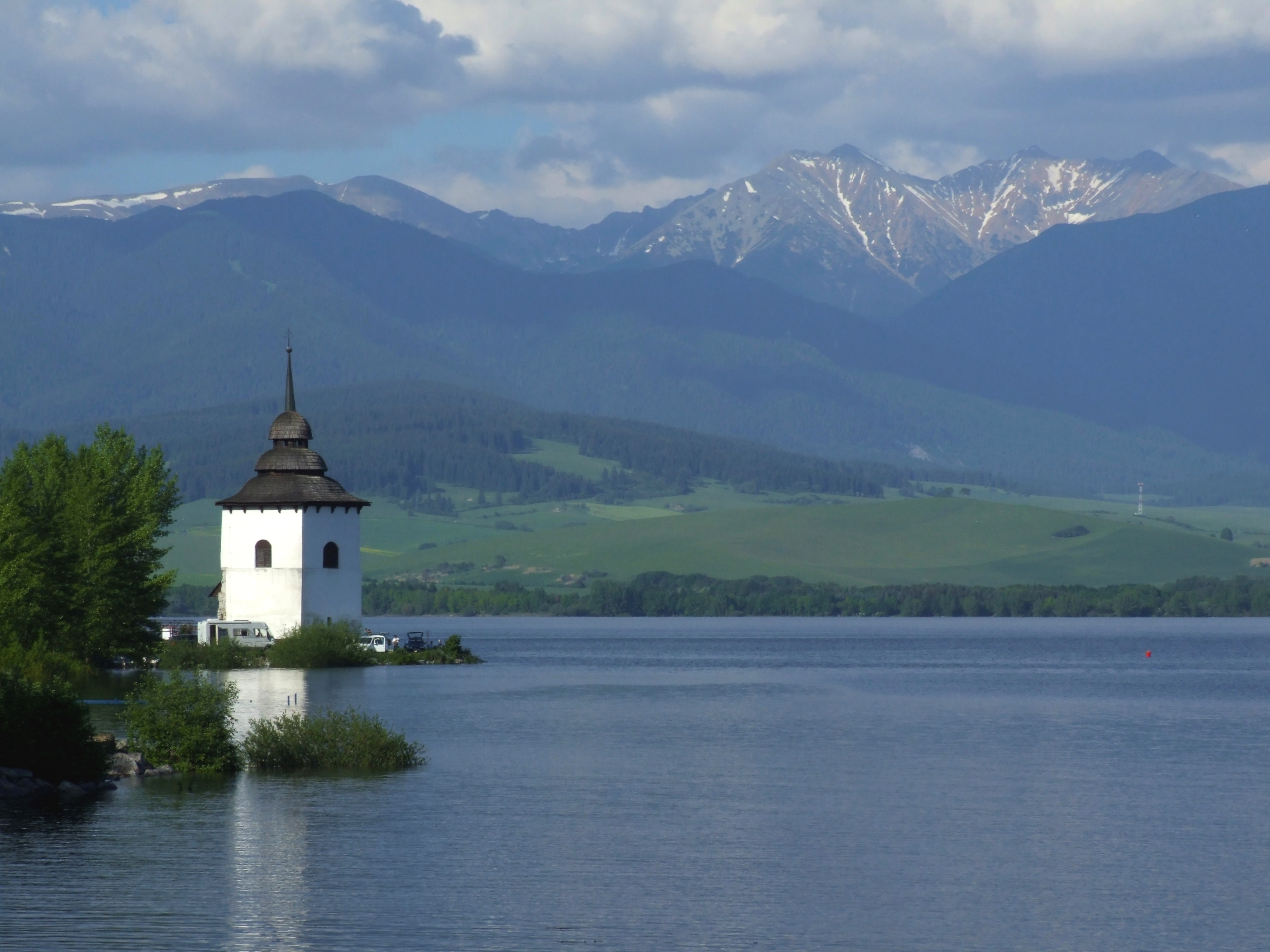
Church tower at Liptovská Mara

Historical churches can be found in virtually every village and town in Slovakia. Most of them are built in the Baroque style, but there are also many examples of Romanesque and Gothic architecture, for example Banská Bystrica, Bardejov and Spišská Kapitula. The St. James Church in Levoča with the tallest wood-carved altar in the world and the Church of the Holy Spirit in Žehra with medieval frescos are UNESCO World Heritage Sites. The St. Martin's Concathedral in Bratislava served as the coronation church for the Kingdom of Hungary. The oldest sacral buildings in Slovakia stem from the Great Moravian period in the 9th century. Very precious structures are the complete wooden churches of northern and northern-eastern Slovakia. Most were built from the 15th century onwards by Catholics, Lutherans and members of eastern-rite churches.

=== Folklore ===
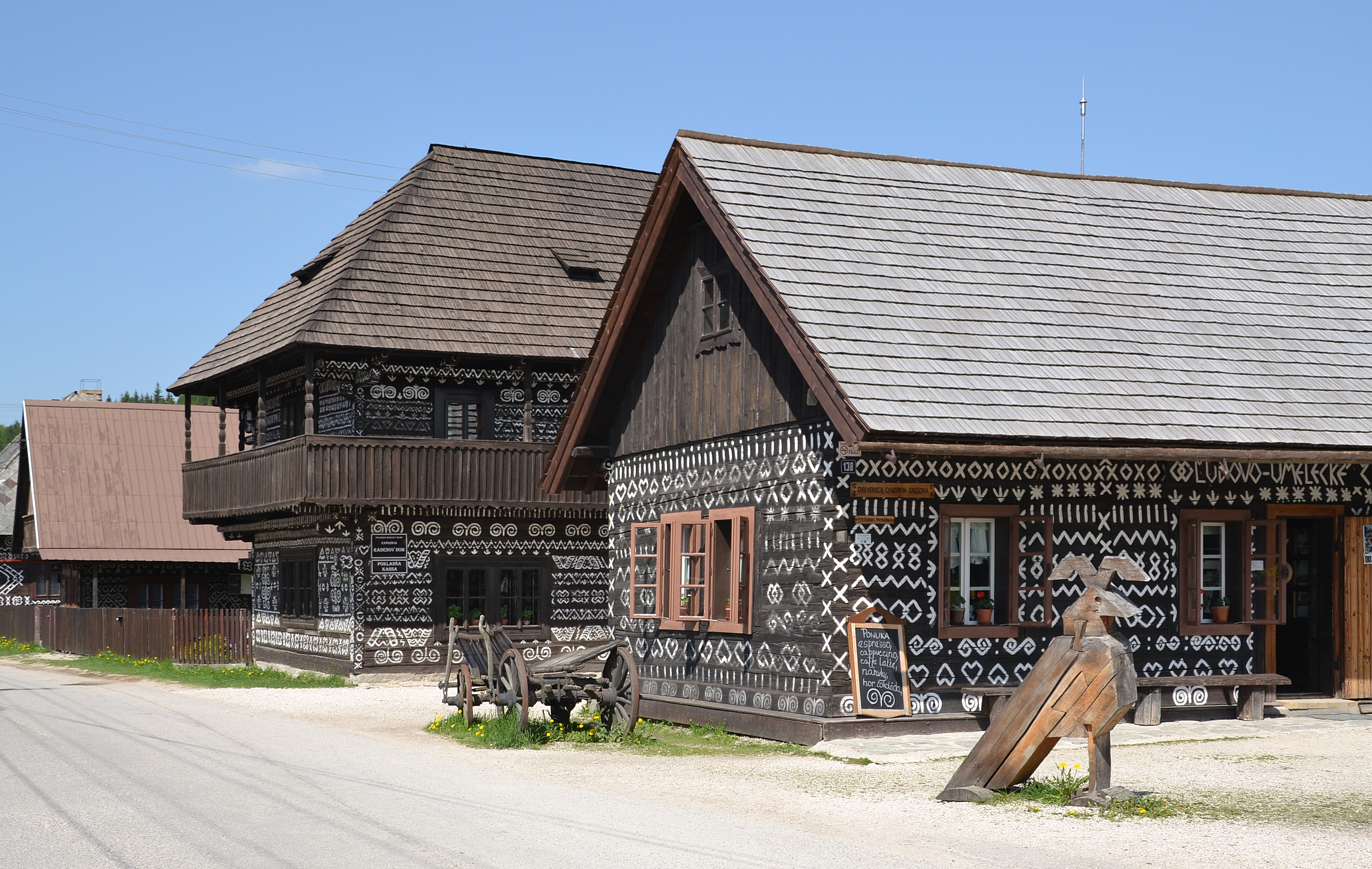
Folk architecture is well preserved in Čičmany.

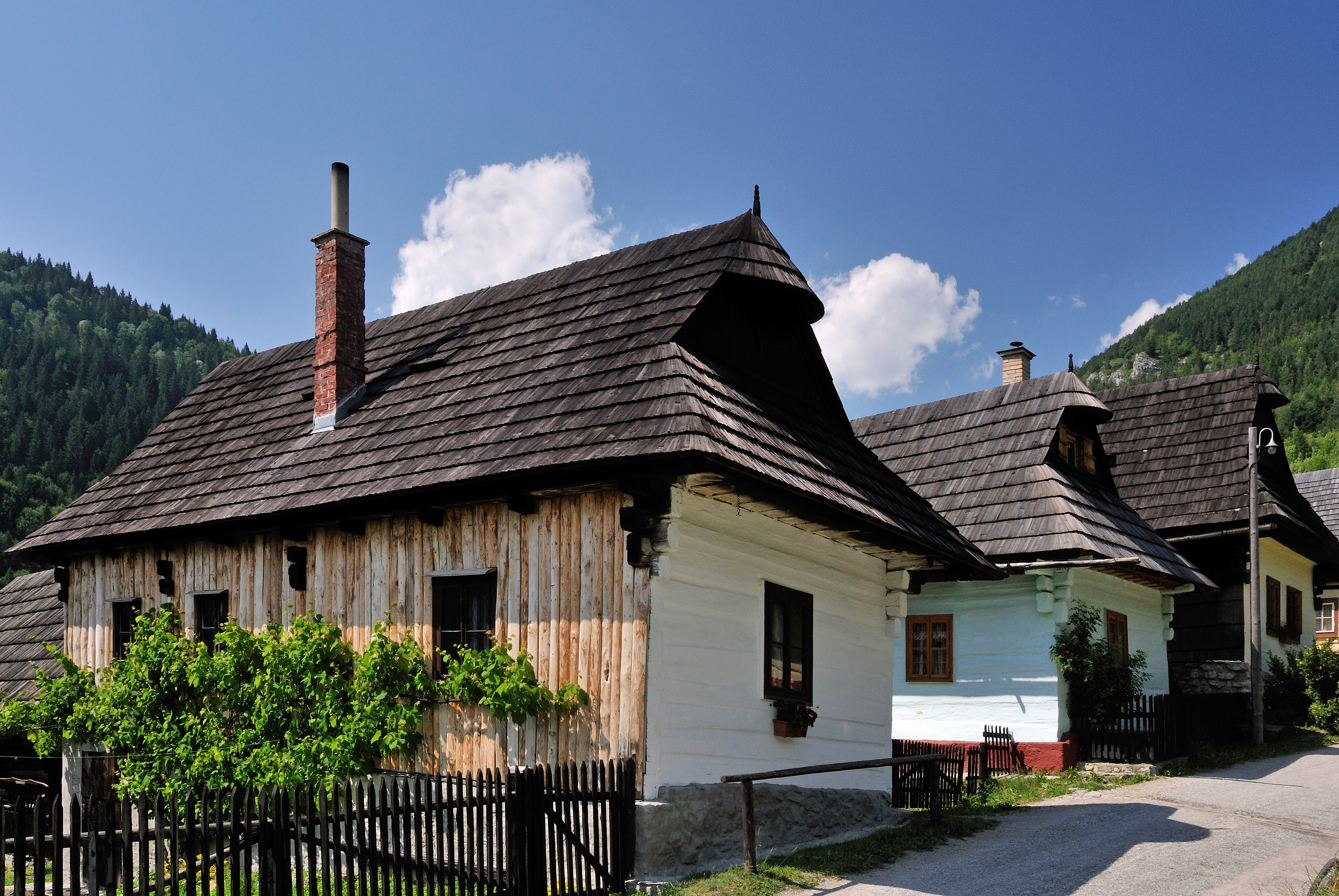
Wooden folk architecture can be seen in the well-preserved village of Vlkolínec, a UNESCO World Heritage Site.

Slovakia also has rich folk traditions: songs, dances, folk art, folk costumes and folk and vernacular architecture. Complete historical villages were preserved only in some cases, such as in Čičmany, Vlkolínec (UNESCO site), Brhlovce, Špania Dolina, Osturňa, Podbiel, Stará Hora in Sebechleby, Plavecký Peter, Veľké Leváre, and Ždiar.

=== Souvenirs and shopping ===
Typical souvenirs from Slovakia are dolls dressed in folk costumes, ceramic objects, crystal glass, carved wooden figures, črpáks (wooden pitcher), fujaras (a folk instrument on the UNESCO list) and valaškas (a decorated folk hatchet) and above all products made from corn husks and wire, notably human figures. Souvenirs can be bought in the shops run by the state organization ÚĽUV (Ústredie ľudovej umeleckej výroby - Center of Folk Art Production). Dielo shop chain sells works of Slovak artists and craftsmen. These shops are mostly found in towns and cities.

Prices of imported products are generally the same as in the neighboring countries, whereas prices of local products and services, especially food, are usually lower.

== Food and beverage ==
Food remains relatively cheap compared to Western Europe. Slovakia offers regional wines and beer brands. The most popular wines are from the Tokaj, Little Carpathians, Nitra, Topoľčany and Záhorie regions. Hubert is a Slovak sparkling wine brand and Karpatské Brandy Špeciál is a popular brandy. Demänovka and Horec are traditional herbal liqueurs. Other popular Slovak distilled beverages include slivovica (plum brandy) and borovička, made of juniper berries. Popular beer brands are Topvar, Zlatý Bažant, Šariš, and Corgoň.

Cheese and cheese products (especially bryndza, korbáčik, oštiepok, parenica, and tvaroh cheeses), žinčica are traditional Slovak specialties.

It is voluntary, that if you are satisfied with services in restaurant or in a pub, you can give staff tips, as these are not included in the final bill. It could be up to 10 percent of the total bill.

== Objects on the UNESCO World Heritage List ==
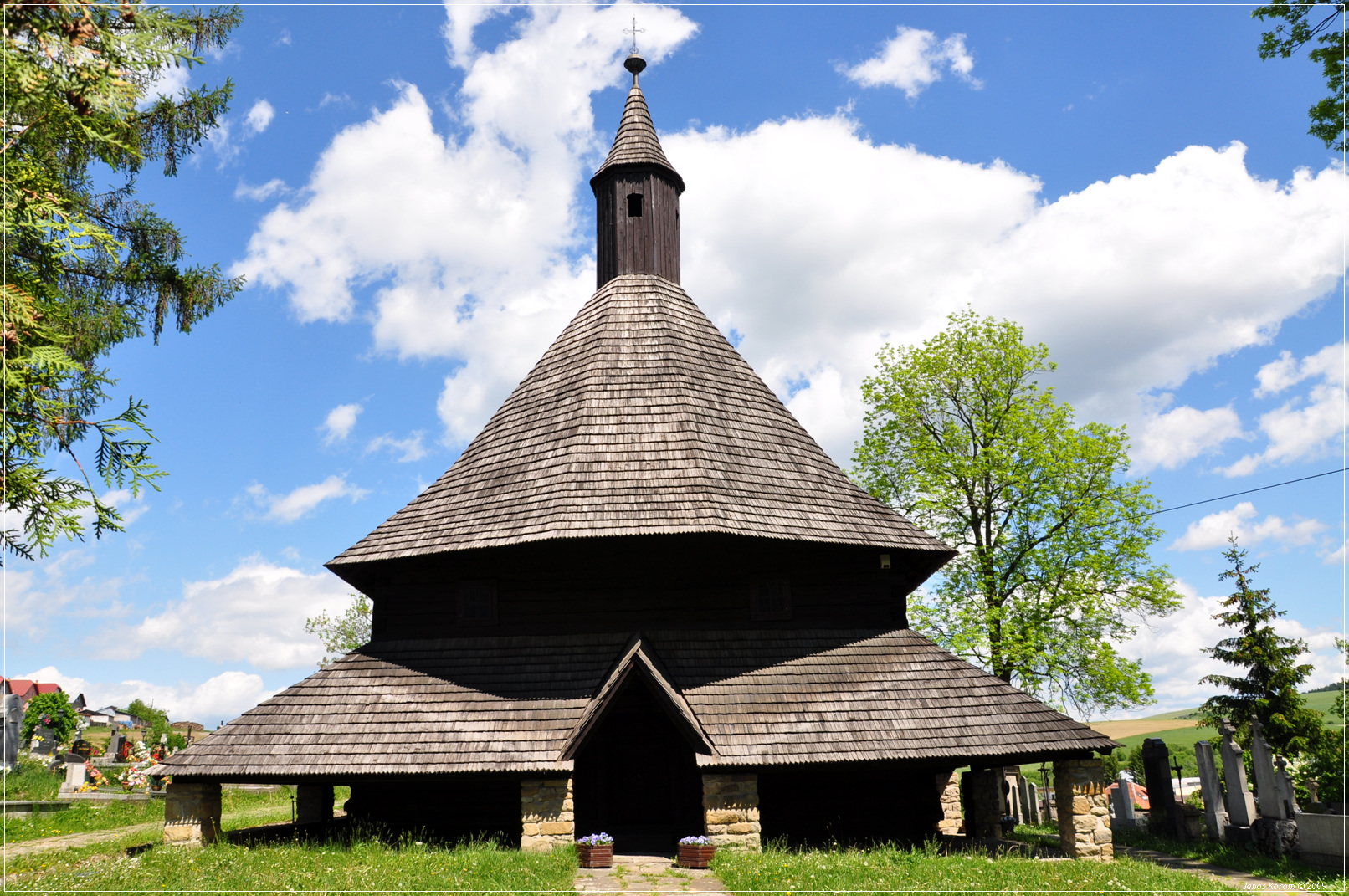
Church of All Saints of Tvrdošín

Objects currently on the list:

- Banská Štiavnica (a former major mining town) and tajchy (ancient water reservoirs around the town)
- Bardejov (a historic town)
- Levoča, Spiš Castle and associated cultural monuments
  - Levoča
  - Spiš Castle
  - a medieval ecclesiastical town Spišská Kapitula
  - frescos in a medieval church in Žehra
  - Spišské Podhradie
- Vlkolínec (folk architecture)
- Caves in the Slovak Karst:
  - Dobšiná Ice Cave
  - Domica Cave
  - Gombasek Cave
  - Jasovská Cave
  - Krásnohorská Cave
  - Ochtinská Aragonite Cave
- Primeval beech forests in Poloniny National Park and Vihorlat Mountains (localities: Havešová, Stužica, Rožok and Kyjovský prales)
- Wooden churches in central and eastern Slovakia (in Hervartov, Tvrdošín, Kežmarok, Leštiny, Hronsek, Bodružal, Ladomirová, Ruská Bystrá)

== History ==
Tourism in what is today Slovakia began to develop in the mid-19th century when travellers started to visit the High Tatra and Low Tatra mountains. The first accommodation and catering facilities were built in the late 19th century and this development accelerated after 1918 with the creation of Czechoslovakia. The number of tourists grew steadily from 270,000 domestic and 45,000 foreign tourists in 1926 to 546,000 domestic and 82,000 foreign tourists in 1936. The development of the tourist industry slowed down during World War II. After the introduction of the Communist regime in 1948, Westerners were no longer welcomed in Czechoslovakia, which naturally caused material losses to the tourism industry. Tourism was controlled by the communist regime ideologically, politically and economically, and the regime failed to invest sufficiently in tourism facilities and infrastructures (with the exception of the High Tatra region). On the other hand, however, since most Czechoslovak citizens were virtually prohibited from travelling abroad (especially to the West), the regime had to provide more recreational facilities for the population in its own country: In 1989 (at the end of the Communist regime), there were 988 accommodation facilities (389 hotels, 17 motels, 200 hostels, 82 camping sites, 130 cottage camps and other) with 145,822 beds in Slovakia. These were used by some 3.9 m tourists (956,702 from abroad). The biggest tourist centers included Bratislava, High Tatras, Košice, Banská Bystrica and Piešťany. The number of travel agencies (ČEDOK, Tatratour, Slovakotourist, Javorina etc.) was limited by the government.

After the fall of Communism in 1989, Slovakia's tourism began to adapt to the condition of market economy. The facilities were gradually privatised and new facilities have been built, also with the help of foreign capital. Dozens of new travel agencies have been established, and the number of tourists from abroad and income from tourism increased considerably. Passive tourism (Slovaks travelling abroad) increased as well – in the 1990s Slovaks travelled predominantly to the neighbouring countries and Croatia, and since the late 1990s the foreign destinations of Slovaks have shifted to major world tourist destinations (Egypt, France, Indonesia etc.).

== Tarantino - Roth film ==
In 2006, the governments of the Czech Republic and Slovakia formally protested against the film Hostel, stating that the film portrayed their countries as dangerous, filled with crime and prostitution. Eli Roth, the film's director, has stated that the film was inspired by a Thai website he found online which he claims advertised an opportunity for tourists to engage in torture and murder. He claims that the site alleged participants to be murdered were willing due to extreme poverty.

Slovakia's government stated the film damaged the image of Slovakia and could be harmful to the tourism industry, an idea perpetuated in the opening paragraph of The Denver Post's announcement in 2007 of a sequel with a tongue-in-cheek claim that the U.S. State Department might add the former Soviet nation to the list of travel advisories for Americans abroad. This image of Slovakia had not been helped by David Edelstein's 2006 review of the original in New York Magazine, which he opened by blithely commenting on the "nonstop naked sauna party" in the Slovak village that serves as a backdrop.

== See also ==
- List of castles in Slovakia
- List of caves in Slovakia
- List of national parks of Slovakia
