= Dreveník =

Nature preserve in Žehra, Slovakia

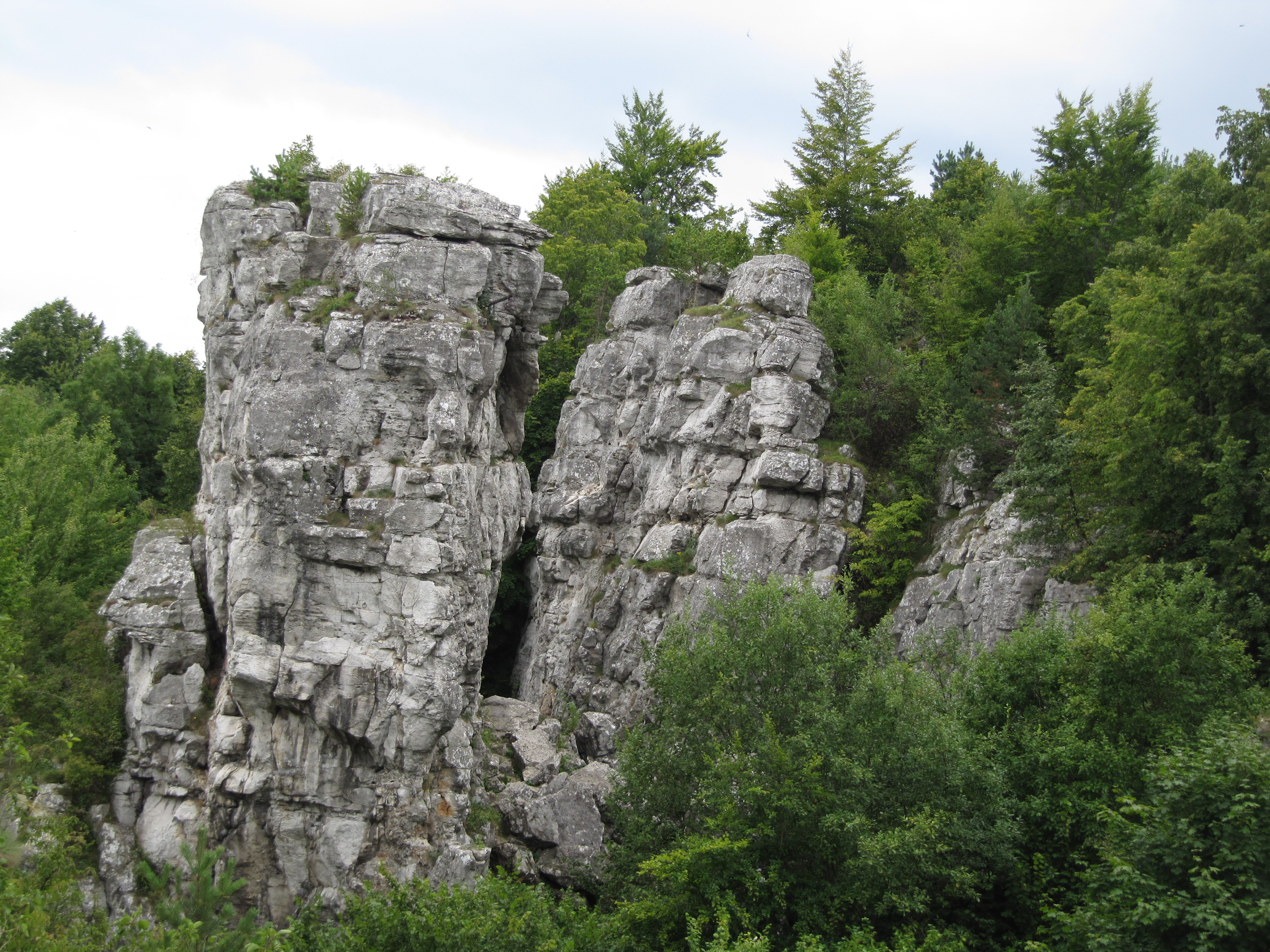
- Interactive map of Dreveník
- 48.984217°N 20.772483°E
- Location: Žehra and Spišské Podhradie
- Region: Košice Region and Prešov Region

Dreveník is a mesa-shaped travertine mound in the Hornád Basin and a national nature reserve. It is located on the border of the districts of Spišská Nová Ves and Levoča. This area, with an area of 1,018,186 m², has been protected since 1925. Together with the nearby Spiš Castle, it has been included in the World Heritage Site of UNESCO since 1993. It is also the largest travertine massif in Slovakia.

== History ==
In 1925, the State Land Office in Prague issued a decision to return the land to the Csáky family owners of the Hodkovce estate, on the condition that they ensure the declaration of a protected area. This was the first step on the path of a century-long history of protecting the largest travertine formation in Slovakia. In 1994, Dreveník was declared as a national nature reserve.

== Geology ==
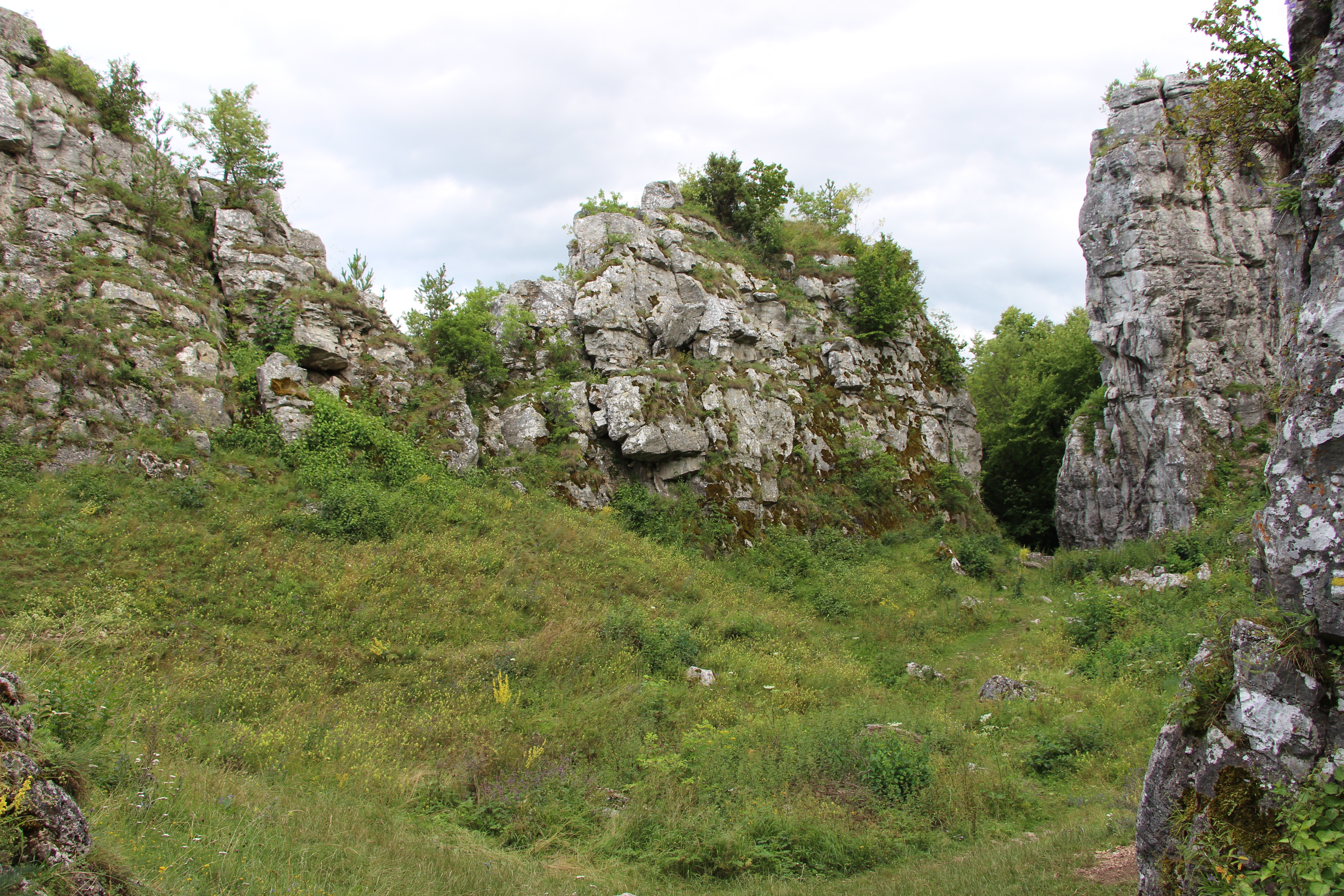
Dreveník

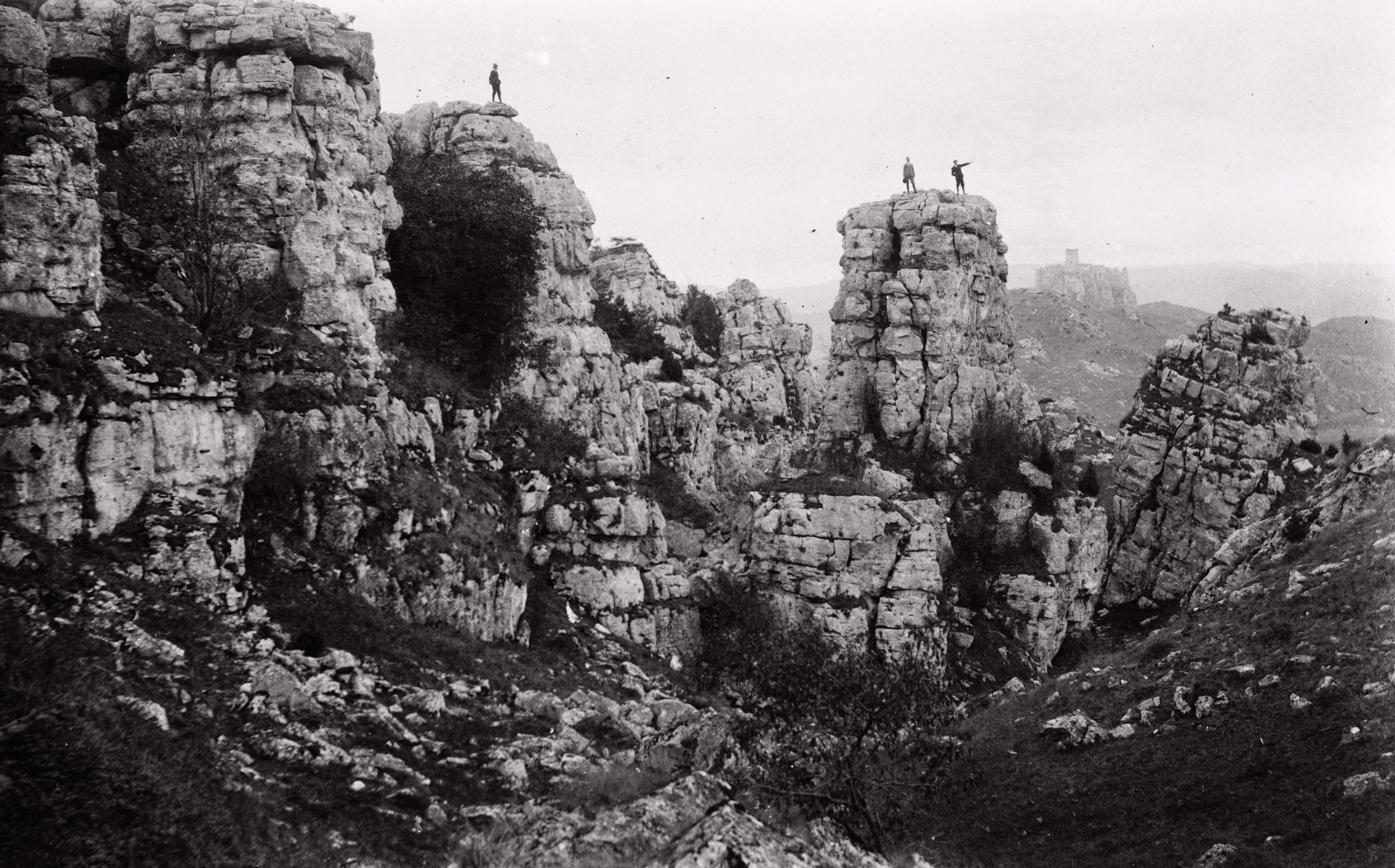
A photo of Dreveník taken in 1928

The Dreveník massif was formed in the Tertiary period. The mound was created from mineral water springs in a tectonic quarry. It was formed by the connection of several limestone-travertine mounds (Pažie, Kozia, Ostrá hura). It is the oldest formation of its type in the vicinity of Spišské Podhradie and the largest travertine area in Slovakia. Among the large number of rock formations is the gorge "Hell" or the rock town "Stone Paradise".

== Findings ==
The first evidence of human presence in this place dates back to prehistoric times, more precisely to the Stone Age. In the past, remains of human and animal skeletons were found in Dreveník, as well as fossils of plants and animals, which are classified as the oldest findings of the initial settlement of eastern Slovakia. The finds included: a petrified egg of a common plover, mastodons and a mammoth. In 2006, jewelry from the period 1,500 BC were discovered in the clay sediments, at the mouth of one of the caves in Dreveník, as well as ceramics and human bones.
