= Spišské Podhradie =

- Municipality
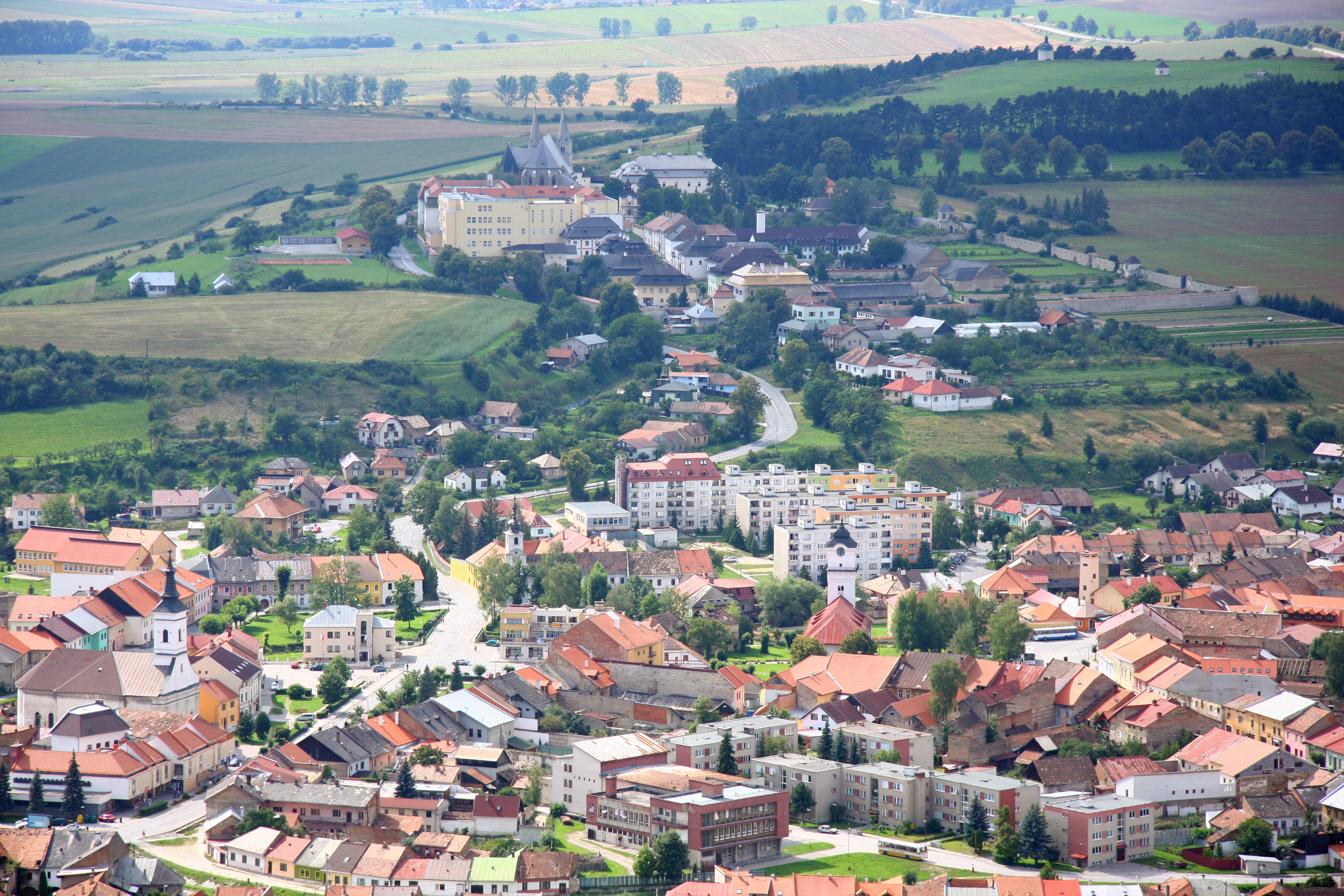
- View of Spišské Podhradie from the Spiš Castle

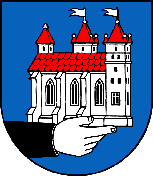
- Flag Coat of arms

- Location of Spišské Podhradie in the Prešov Region Location of Spišské Podhradie in Slovakia
- Coordinates: 49.00°N 20.75°E
- Country: Slovakia
- Region: Prešov Region
- District: Levoča District
- First mentioned: 1249

Government
  - Mayor: MVDr. Michal Kapusta

Area
  - Total: 24.94 km^{2} (9.63 sq mi)
- Elevation: 448 m (1,470 ft)

Population (2025)
  - Total: 3,715
- Time zone: UTC+1 (CET)
  - Summer (DST): UTC+2 (CEST)
- Postal code: 530 4
- Area code: +421 53
- Vehicle registration plate (until 2022): LE
- Website: www.spisskepodhradie.sk

Spišské Podhradie (German: Kirchdrauf, Hungarian: Szepesváralja) is a town in Spiš in the Prešov Region of Slovakia. Its population is 3,775.

Spišské Podhradie is situated at the foot of the hill of Spiš Castle. It had a Zipser German settlement, with its own church and priest, in 1174. Just above, and adjacent to, the town is the ecclesiastical settlement of Spišská Kapitula (hence an old German name Kirchdorf, meaning "church town"). The town contains a number of Renaissance merchants' houses. It also has one of the few remaining synagogue buildings (now disused) in the region. The Sivá Brada cold water spring is located nearby.

== Geography ==
The municipality lies at an altitude of 448 metres (1,470 ft) and covers an area of 24.94 km^{2} (9.63 sq mi) (2025).

== Population ==
Population statistic (10 years)
Year	1995	2005	2015	2025
Count	3685	3871	4020	3715
Difference		+5.04%	+3.84%	−7.58%

Population statistic
Year	2024	2025
Count	3730	3715
Difference		−0.40%

It has a population of 3715 people (31 December 2025).

=== Ethnicity ===
Census 2021 (1+ %)
Ethnicity	Number	Fraction
Slovak	3425	90.34%
Romani	363	9.57%
Not found out	232	6.11%
Rusyn	51	1.34%
Total	3791	

In year 2021 was 3791 people by ethnicity 3425 as Slovak, 363 as Romani, 232 as Not found out, 51 as Rusyn, 12 as Czech, 5 as Chinese, 5 as Hungarian, 4 as Polish, 4 as German, 2 as Russian, 2 as Other, 1 as Irish, 1 as Canadian and 1 as Albanian.

Note on population: The difference values of population numbers in the table "Population statistic" and in the sections "Ethnicity" & "Religion" is caused by the use of various statistical methods.

=== Religion ===
Census 2021 (1+ %)
Religion	Number	Fraction
Roman Catholic Church	2823	74.47%
None	390	10.29%
Not found out	329	8.68%
Greek Catholic Church	122	3.22%
Evangelical Church	41	1.08%
Christian Congregations in Slovakia	39	1.03%
Total	3791	

In year 2021 was 3791 people by religion 2823 from Roman Catholic Church, 390 from None, 329 from Not found out, 122 from Greek Catholic Church, 41 from Evangelical Church, 39 from Christian Congregations in Slovakia, 10 from Other, 10 from Ad hoc movements, 5 from Eastern Orthodox Church, 4 from Calvinist Church, 3 from Other and not ascertained christian church, 3 from Islam, 3 from Apostolic Church, 2 from Jehovah's Witnesses, 2 from Czechoslovak Hussite Church, 1 from Hinduism, 1 from United Methodist Church, 1 from Seventh-day Adventist Church, 1 from Church of Jesus Christ of Latter-day Saints and 1 from Buddhism.

== Twin towns — sister cities ==
Spišské Podhradie is twinned with:

- Głogów Małopolski, Poland
- Pinetop-Lakeside, Arizona, United States
- Show Low, Arizona, United States
- Vrbové, Slovakia

== Dreveník ==
Dreveník is a mesa-shaped travertine mound in the Hornád Basin and a national nature reserve. It is located on the border of the districts of Spišská Nová Ves and Levoča. This area, with an area of 1,018,186 m², has been protected since 1925. Together with the nearby Spiš Castle, it has been included in the World Heritage Site of UNESCO since 1993. It is also the largest travertine massif in Slovakia.

== Gallery ==
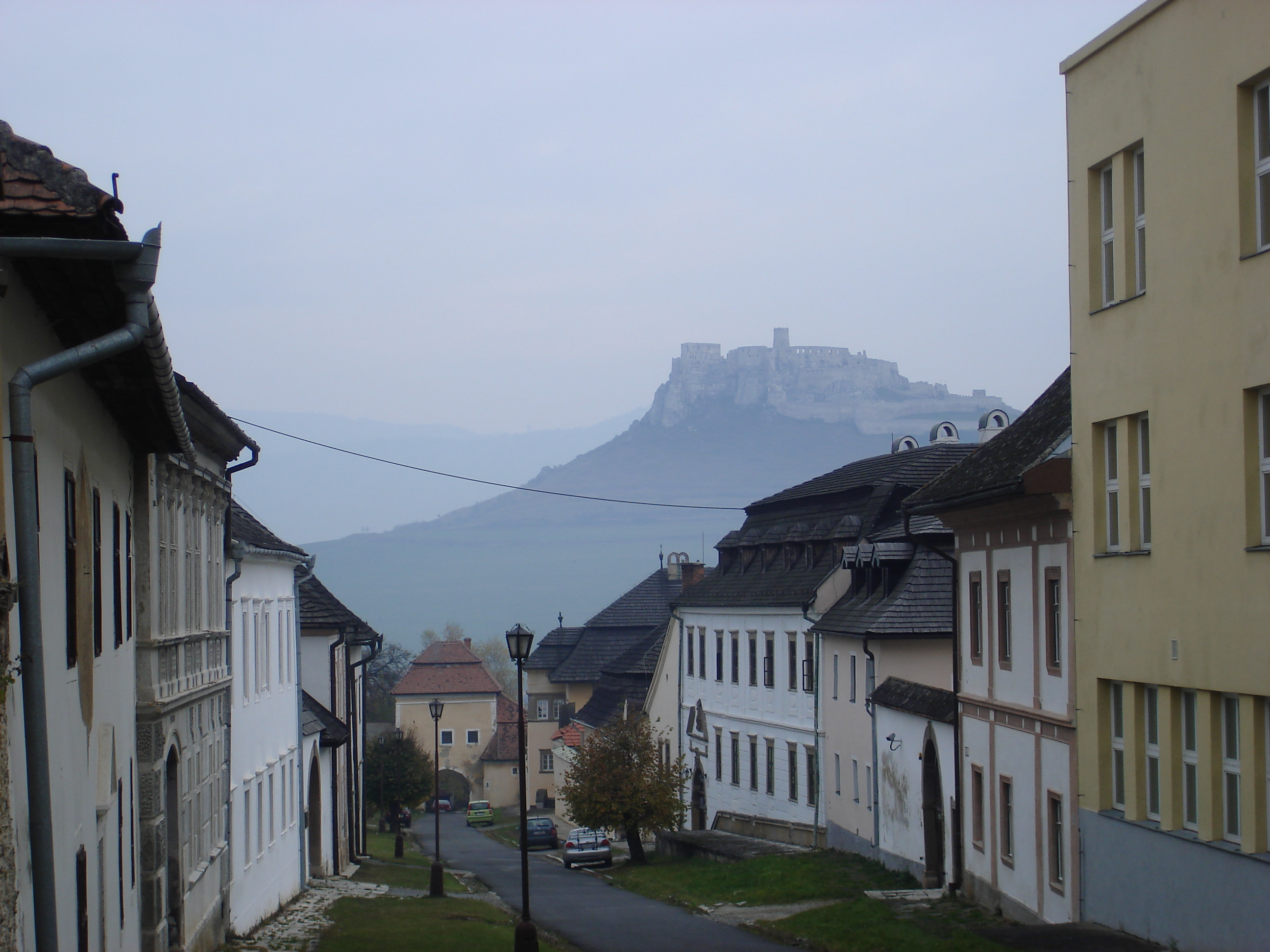
Road in Spišská Kapitula with Spiš Castle above

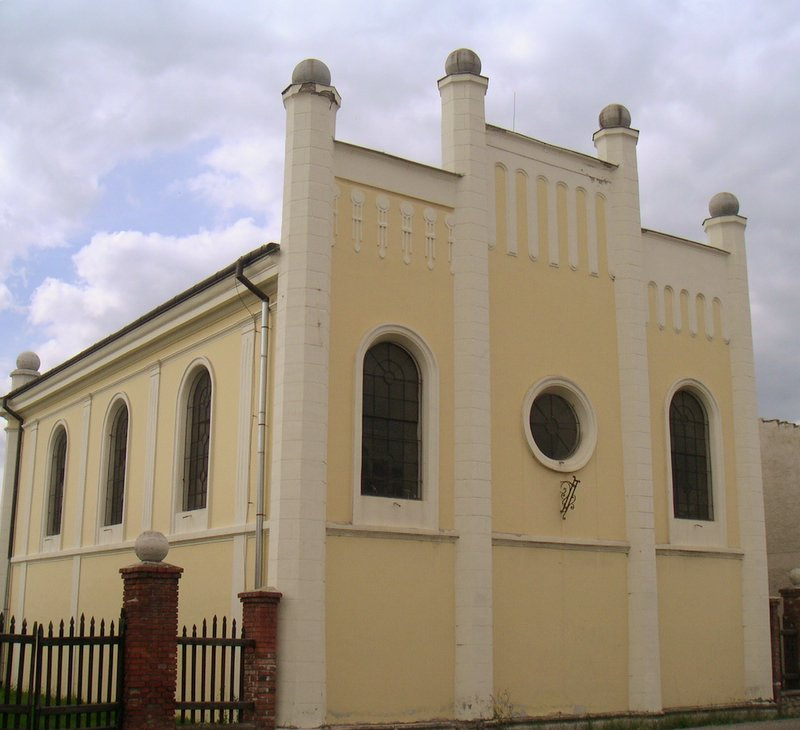
Synagogue at Spišské Podhradie

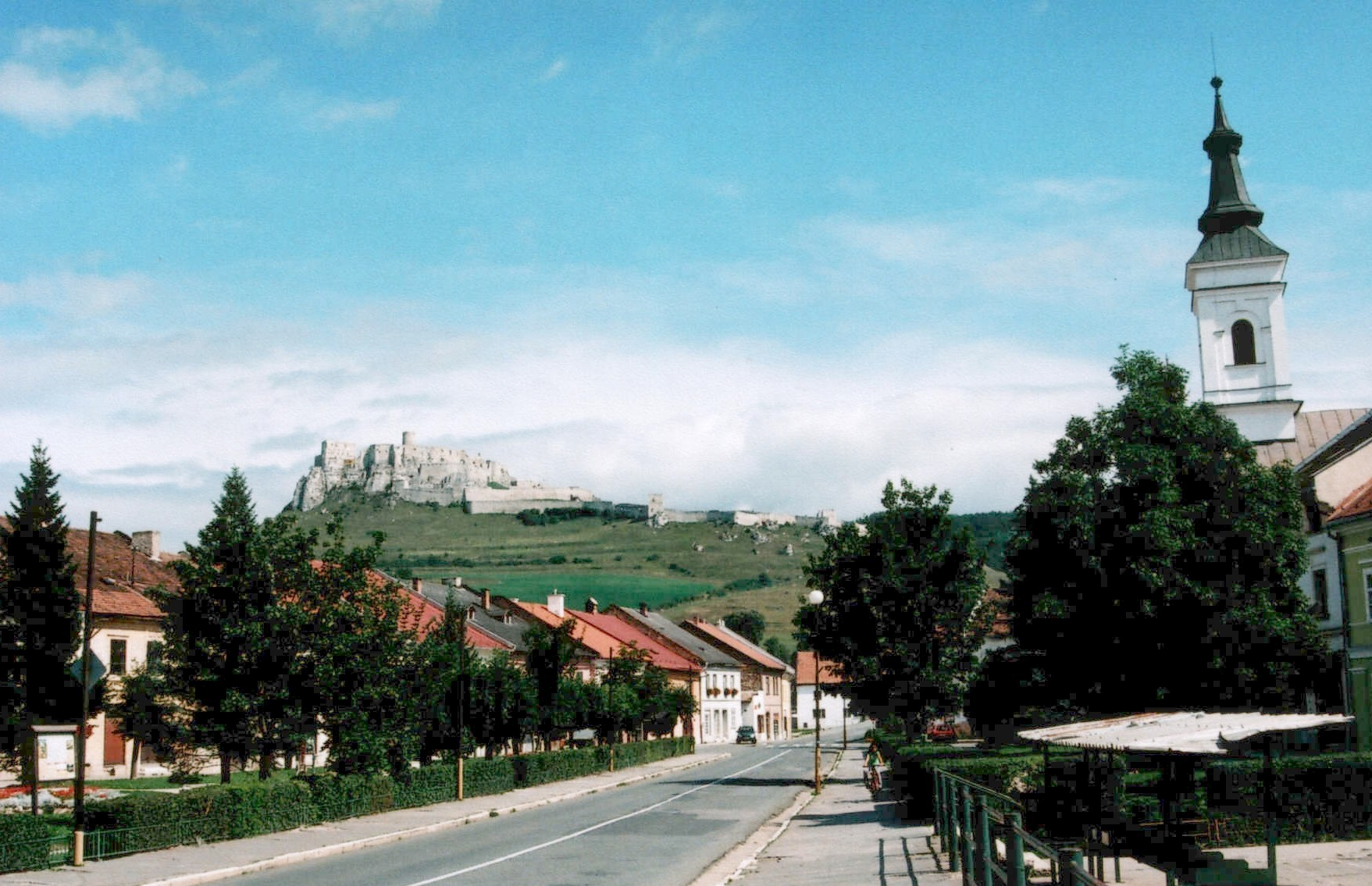
Town center and Spiš Castle above

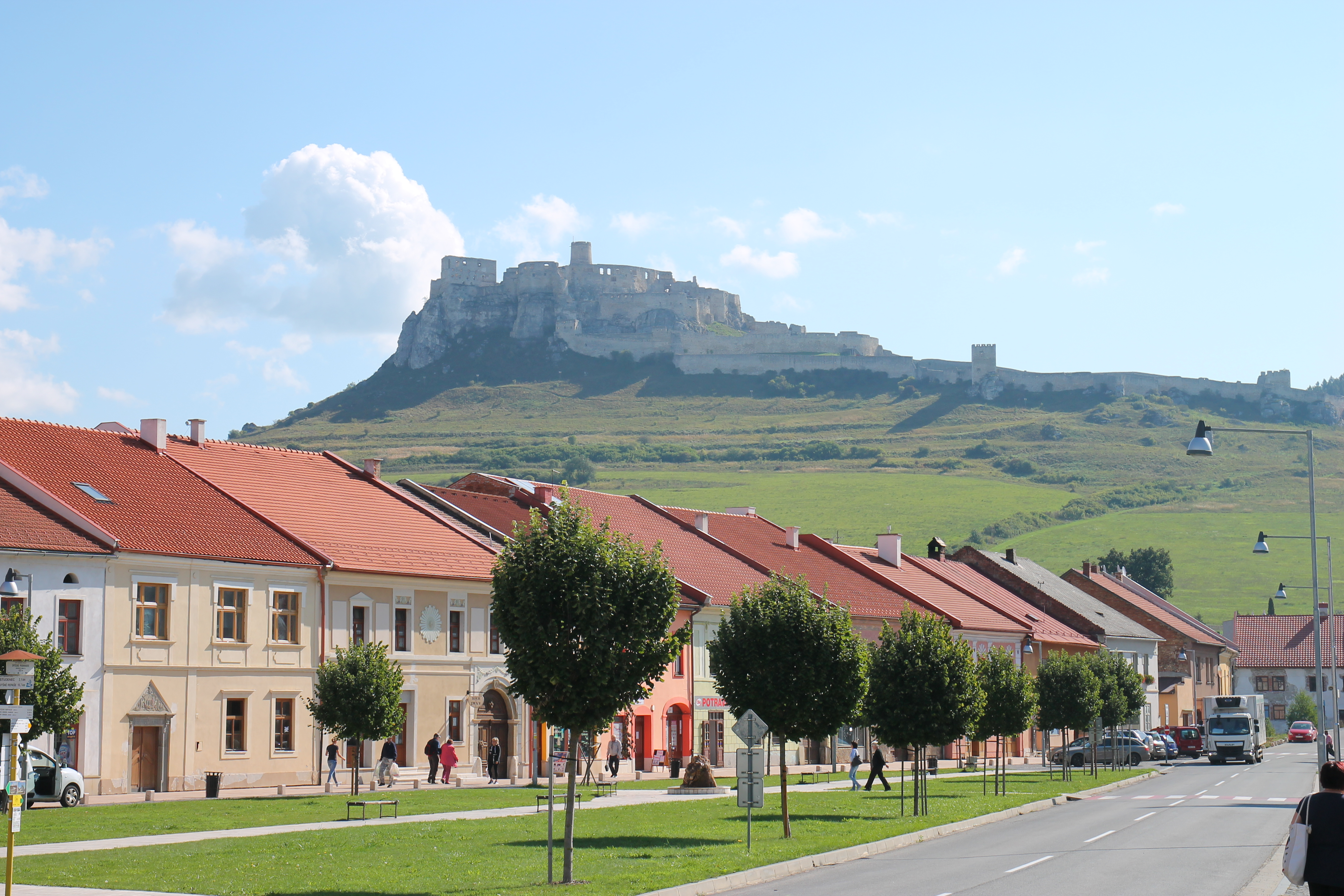
View of Spišské Podhradie and Spiš Castle in the background

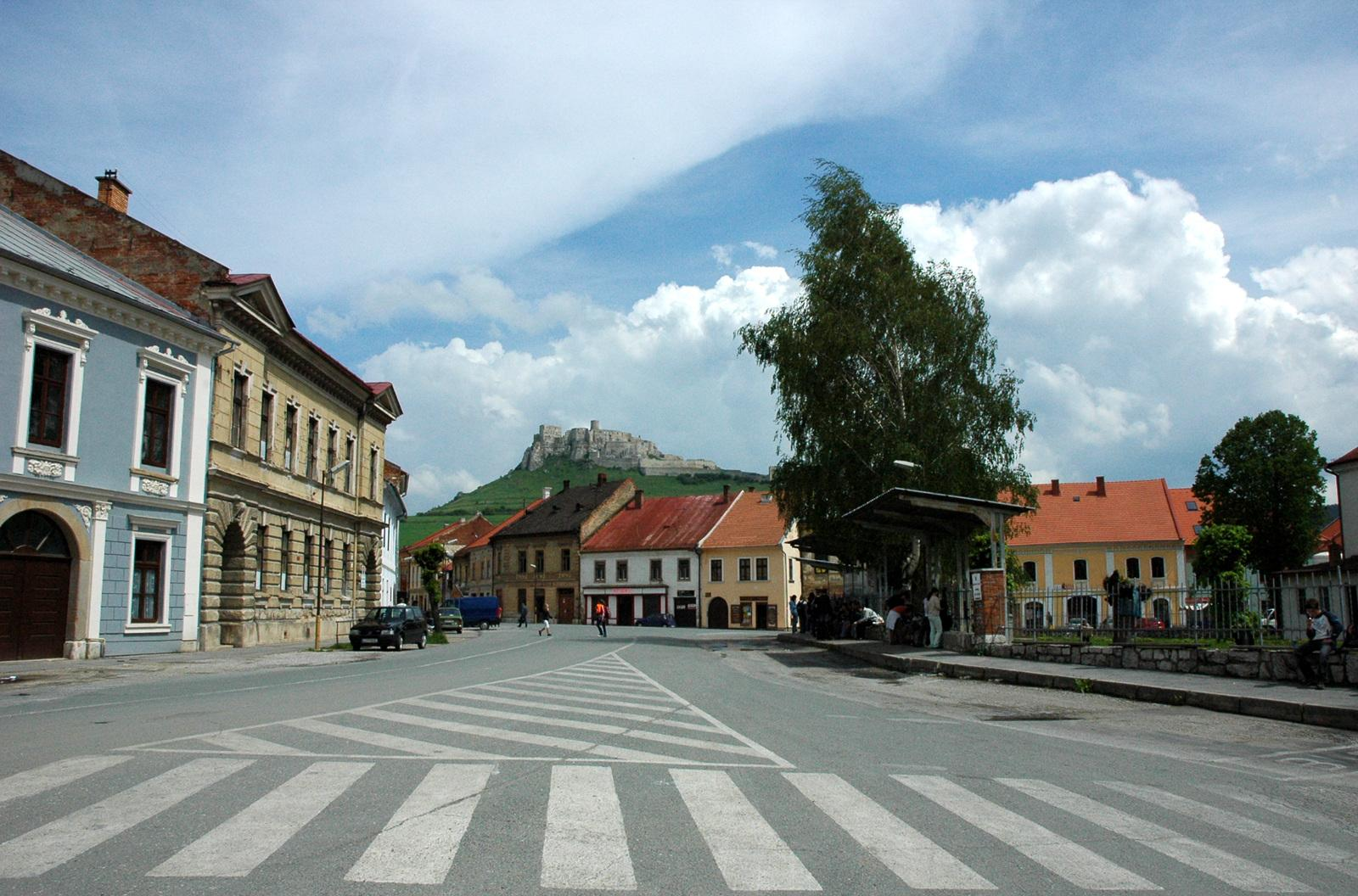
A street in Spišské Podhradie
