= Hodkovce =

Village and municipality in Slovakia

Hodkovce Hatkóc
- Municipality
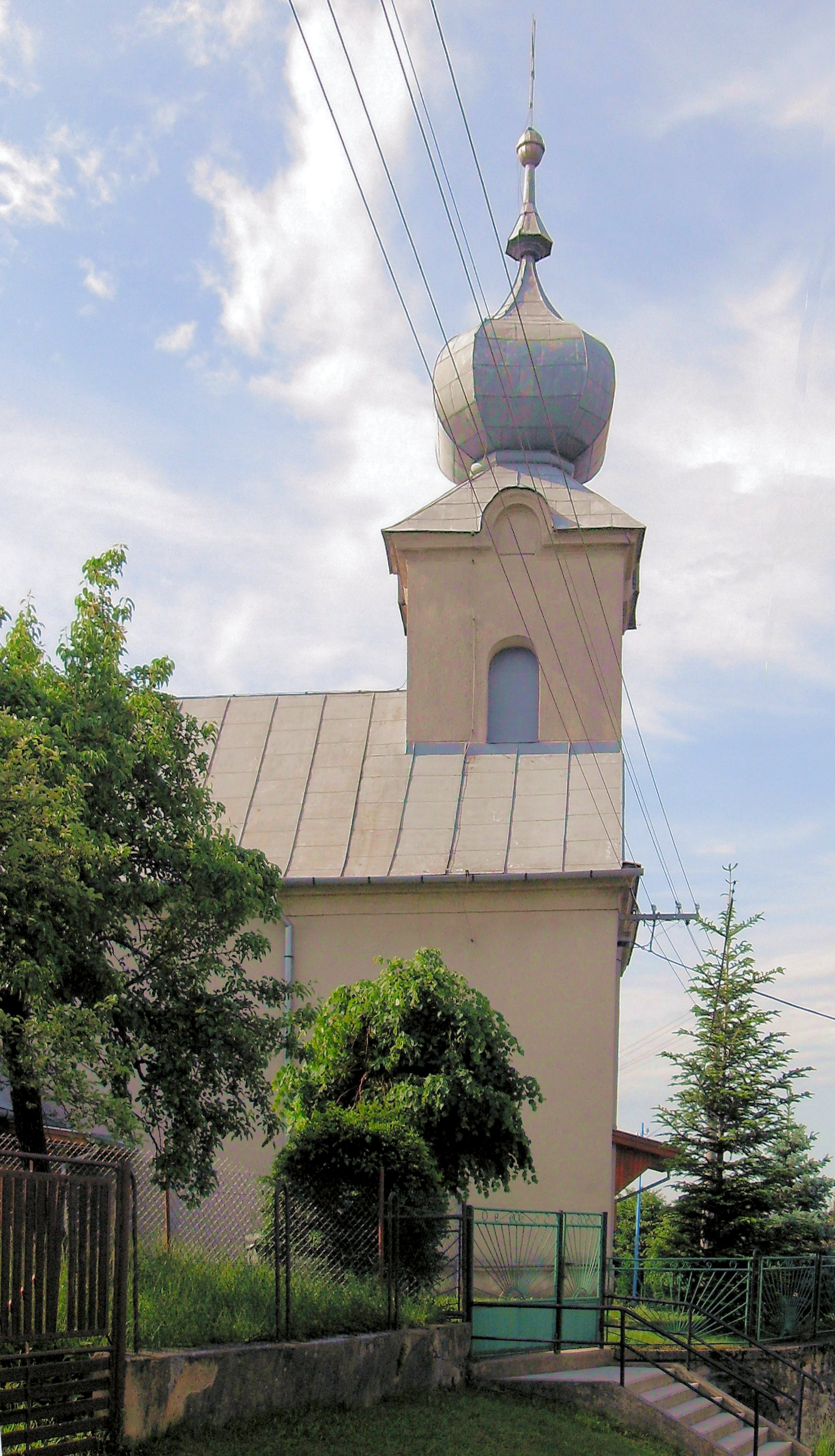

- Flag

- Location of Hodkovce in the Košice Region Location of Hodkovce in Slovakia
- Coordinates: 48.68°N 21.10°E
- Country: Slovakia
- Region: Košice Region
- District: Košice-okolie District
- First mentioned: 1318

Area
  - Total: 7.58 km^{2} (2.93 sq mi)
- Elevation: 323 m (1,060 ft)

Population (2025)
  - Total: 416
- Time zone: UTC+1 (CET)
  - Summer (DST): UTC+2 (CEST)
- Postal code: 442 1
- Area code: +421 55
- Vehicle registration plate (until 2022): KS
- Website: hodkovce.eu

Hodkovce (Hungarian: Hatkóc) is a village and municipality in Košice-okolie District in the Kosice Region of eastern Slovakia.

== History ==
The village was first mentioned in 1318.

== Geography ==
The municipality lies at an altitude of 323 metres (1,060 ft) and covers an area of 7.58 km^{2} (2.93 sq mi) (2025).

== Population ==
Population statistic (10 years)
Year	1995	2005	2015	2025
Count	254	246	299	416
Difference		−3.14%	+21.54%	+39.13%

Population statistic
Year	2024	2025
Count	411	416
Difference		+1.21%

It has a population of 416 people (31 December 2025).

=== Ethnicity ===
Census 2021 (1+ %)
Ethnicity	Number	Fraction
Slovak	330	97.34%
Not found out	7	2.06%
Total	339	

In year 2021 was 339 people by ethnicity 330 as Slovak, 7 as Not found out, 2 as Czech, 2 as Rusyn, 2 as English, 1 as German and 1 as Hungarian.

Note on population: The difference values of population numbers in the table "Population statistic" and in the sections "Ethnicity" & "Religion" is caused by the use of various statistical methods.

=== Religion ===
Census 2021 (1+ %)
Religion	Number	Fraction
Roman Catholic Church	240	70.8%
None	55	16.22%
Greek Catholic Church	10	2.95%
Not found out	8	2.36%
Evangelical Church	7	2.06%
Other	5	1.47%
Total	339	

In year 2021 was 339 people by religion 240 from Roman Catholic Church, 55 from None, 10 from Greek Catholic Church, 8 from Not found out, 7 from Evangelical Church, 5 from Other, 3 from Calvinist Church, 3 from Islam, 3 from Ad hoc movements, 2 from Eastern Orthodox Church, 2 from Christian Congregations in Slovakia and 1 from United Methodist Church.

== Culture ==
Hodkovce has a single Roman Catholic church, built in 1832 in Classical style with Baroque motifs. It contains a few relics from the nineteenth century, for example, an oil painting of the Lord's sacrifice (Karol Völck, 1820) and a sculpture of St. Anna, Virgin Mary and Baby Jesus (polychrome, woodcarving).

== Genealogical resources ==
Records for genealogical research are available at the Statny Archiv (state archive) in Kosice, Slovakia.

- Roman Catholic church records (births/marriages/deaths): 1761–1907 (parish B)
- Greek Catholic church records (births/marriages/deaths): 1870–1902 (parish B)

== See also ==
- List of municipalities and towns in Slovakia
