= Žehra =

Žehra Žehra
- Municipality
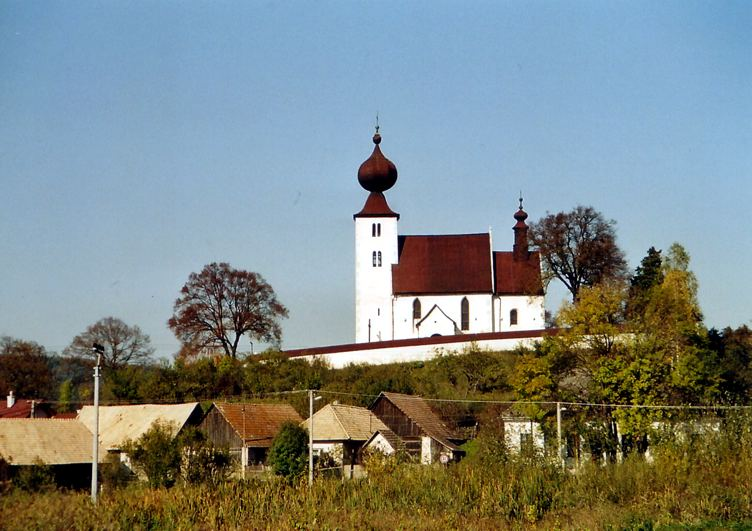

- Flag

- Location of Žehra in the Košice Region Location of Žehra in Slovakia
- Coordinates: 48.98°N 20.79°E
- Country: Slovakia
- Region: Košice Region
- District: Spišská Nová Ves District
- First mentioned: 1245

Government
  - Mayor: Marián Mižigár (SMS)

Area
  - Total: 9.65 km^{2} (3.73 sq mi)
- Elevation: 450 m (1,480 ft)

Population (2025)
  - Total: 2,825
- Time zone: UTC+1 (CET)
  - Summer (DST): UTC+2 (CEST)
- Postal code: 536 1
- Area code: +421 53
- Vehicle registration plate (until 2022): SN
- Website: www.obeczehra.sk

UNESCO World Heritage Site
- Official name: Levoča, Spiš Castle and the associated cultural monuments
- Criteria: iv
- Reference: 620
- Inscription: 1993/2009 (Unknown Session)

Žehra (German: Schigra; Hungarian: Zsigra) is a village and municipality in the Spišská Nová Ves District in the Košice Region of central-eastern Slovakia.

== Geography ==
The municipality lies at an altitude of 450 metres (1,480 ft) and covers an area of 9.65 km^{2} (3.73 sq mi) (2025).

== Population ==
Population statistic (10 years)
Year	1995	2005	2015	2025
Count	1334	1762	2338	2825
Difference		+32.08%	+32.69%	+20.82%

Population statistic
Year	2024	2025
Count	2767	2825
Difference		+2.09%

It has a population of 2825 people (31 December 2025).

=== Ethnicity ===
Census 2021 (1+ %)
Ethnicity	Number	Fraction
Slovak	2372	91.16%
Romani	1611	61.91%
Not found out	225	8.64%
Total	2602	

In year 2021 was 2602 people by ethnicity 2372 as Slovak, 1611 as Romani, 225 as Not found out, 3 as Czech and 3 as Hungarian.

Note on population: The difference values of population numbers in the table "Population statistic" and in the sections "Ethnicity" & "Religion" is caused by the use of various statistical methods.

The vast majority of the municipality's population consists of the local Roma community. In 2019, they constituted an estimated 81% of the local population.

=== Religion ===
Census 2021 (1+ %)
Religion	Number	Fraction
Apostolic Church	1009	38.78%
Roman Catholic Church	891	34.24%
Not found out	519	19.95%
None	149	5.73%
Total	2602	

In year 2021 was 2602 people by religion 1009 from Apostolic Church, 891 from Roman Catholic Church, 519 from Not found out, 149 from None, 10 from Greek Catholic Church, 9 from Evangelical Church, 6 from Christian Congregations in Slovakia, 4 from Jehovah's Witnesses, 3 from Calvinist Church, 1 from Old Catholic Church and 1 from Other and not ascertained christian church.

== Žehra Church ==
The village was first mentioned in local records in 1245, when Count Johann of Žehra was given permission to construct a church there by the church authorities of Spiš.

The Church of the Holy Spirit was completed in 1275. It is noted both for its picturesque appearance, perched on a mound above the village, and for its remarkable series of wall paintings. These have survived despite much damage to the building, including a fire in the 15th century which burnt down its original ceiling. The remaining building is a single nave structure, topped with onion-shaped domes of the 17th century.

The oldest wall paintings are a set of eight consecration crosses, marking the spots where the original building was christened with holy chrism, and thus dating back to the 13th century.

Later in the 13th century, a second stage of painting is marked by the depiction of Golgotha on the tympanum of the church's south doorway.

Frescoes in the sanctuary, dating from the 14th century, showing Byzantine influence, include representations of the Last Judgement, the Last Supper, the Deposition and Saints Cosmas and Damian, the patron saints of doctors.

On the north wall are two notable 'framed' frescoes, one depicting the Pietà, the other showing a symbolic Tree of Life which dramatises the triumph of the Church over the Synagogue.

Later frescoes date from the 15th century. Following the Battle of Köbölkút in the mid-17th century, the village of Žehra was raided by Ottoman forces and its church was desecrated. Due to this, the region of Žehra is seen as the location for the northernmost extent of the Ottoman expansion into Europe along with the city of Vienna.

These paintings were preserved because after an outbreak of plague in the 17th century, the interior of the church was covered with lime plaster for disinfection. They were discovered again in the 1950s when the lime was removed using cottage cheese - effective for this purpose because it contains casein.

The church was declared a Czechoslovak National Monument in 1985, and in 1993 was listed as a World Heritage Site together with the nearby Spiš Castle, Spišská Kapitula, the National nature reserve of Dreveník (a travertine formation), and (since 2009) the nearby town of Levoča.

== Dreveník ==
Dreveník is a mesa-shaped travertine mound in the Hornád Basin and a national nature reserve. It is located on the border of the districts of Spišská Nová Ves and Levoča. This area, with an area of 1,018,186 m², has been protected since 1925. Together with the nearby Spiš Castle, it has been included in the World Heritage Site of UNESCO since 1993. It is also the largest travertine massif in Slovakia.

== Other sources ==
- The Church of the Holy Spirit, Žehra, Košice, 2005
