= Winter sports in Slovakia =

Overview of winter sports practiced in Slovakia

Ski and winter sports in Slovakia are very prominent and popular given the mountainous topography of the region and the fact that much of the country is covered by snow for a long part of the year.

== Downhill Skiing ==
In spite of its small area, which is mostly hilly, Slovakia is densely interwoven by a net of ski-tows and ski-lifts. More than 1000 ski-tows and 40 ski-lifts are in operation and their number is growing. From the top the terminal stations there are hundreds of down-hill pistes, from the very gentle – for beginners, to the most demanding, which comply with the international criteria for master competitions.

At present, approximately 50 Slovak ski resorts make snow.

== Snowboarding ==
Snowboarding is the fastest developing winter sport in the world. Slovakia is no exception - the number of snowboarders has been increasing every year, partly due to the type of terrain available in ski resorts. Well equipped board parks at the larger resorts offer excellent jumps, ramps and rail-slides. This is especially true of Jasna which is the largest resort in Central Europe and very boarder friendly.

== Ski-Alpinism ==
Ski-alpinism is a combination of cross-country skiing, mountaineering and alpine skiing. Its fans seek new opportunities for testing own stamina and strength in the extreme conditions of winter alpine nature. The Slovak mountains provide very good conditions for pursuing this sport, and ski-alpinism fans recommend Jasenská dolina in the Veľká Fatra Mts., the area of Chopok and Ďumbier in the Low Tatras, Malá Studená dolina and Veľká Studená dolina and Skalnatá dolina in the High Tatras, Roháče and Žiarska dolina in the Western Tatras, and the well known Vrátna dolina in the Malá Fatra Mts.

== Cross-country skiing ==
Bigger ski resorts offer well kept cross-country paths, but skier made paths can be found virtually by any village or tourist centre. Slovakia is rather small, so there is not much of "cross country".

== Ski jumping ==
Ski jumping is not a popular sport in Slovakia. However, some jumping hills exist.

== See also ==
- List of ski areas and resorts in Slovakia
