= Spiš Castle =

Large castle site in eastern Slovakia

- Spišský hrad
- Spišská Nová Ves, Spiš in Slovakia
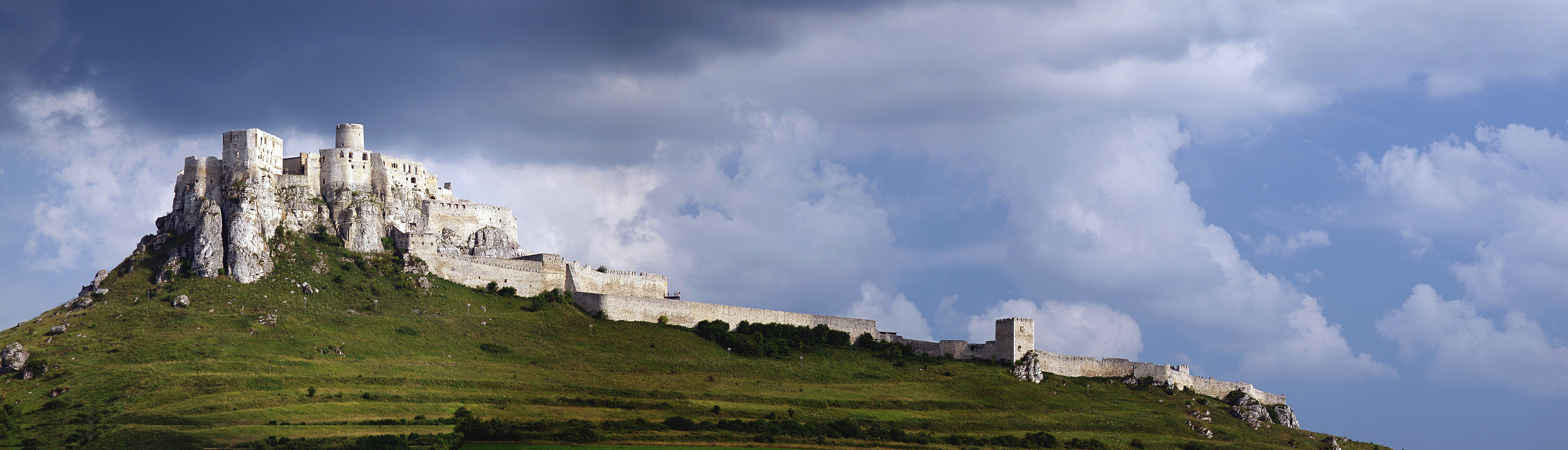
- Spiš Castle

Site information
- Type: Castle
- Website: www.spisskyhrad.com/english/spis-castle/

Location
- Location of Spiš Castle in Slovakia
- Location within Slovakia
- Coordinates: 49°00′02″N 20°46′06″E
- Area: 41,426 m^{2} (10.237 acres)

Site history
- Built: Twelfth century
- Materials: Masonry

The ruins of Spiš Castle (Slovak: Spišský hrad,; Hungarian: Szepesi vár; Polish: Zamek Spiski; German: Zipser Burg) in eastern Slovakia form one of the six largest castle sites in Slovakia. The castle is situated above the town of Spišské Podhradie and the village of Žehra, in the region known as Spiš (Hungarian: Szepes, German: Zips, Polish: Spisz, Latin: Scepusium). It was included in the UNESCO list of World Heritage Sites in 1993 (together with the adjacent locations of Spišská Kapitula and Žehra). The area of the castle is 3.9 ha (9.6 acres) It is administered by the Spiš Museum at Levoča, a division of the Slovak National Museum.

== History ==
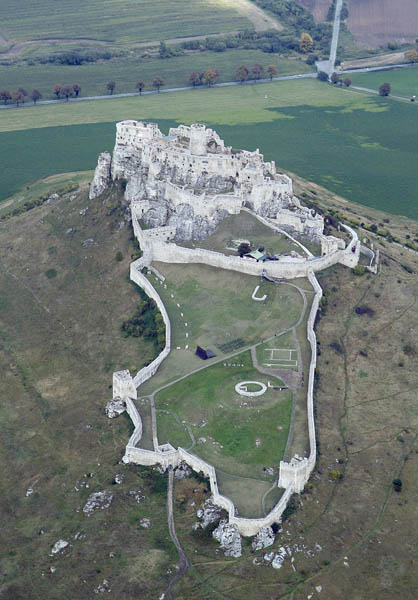
Aerial photograph of the castle

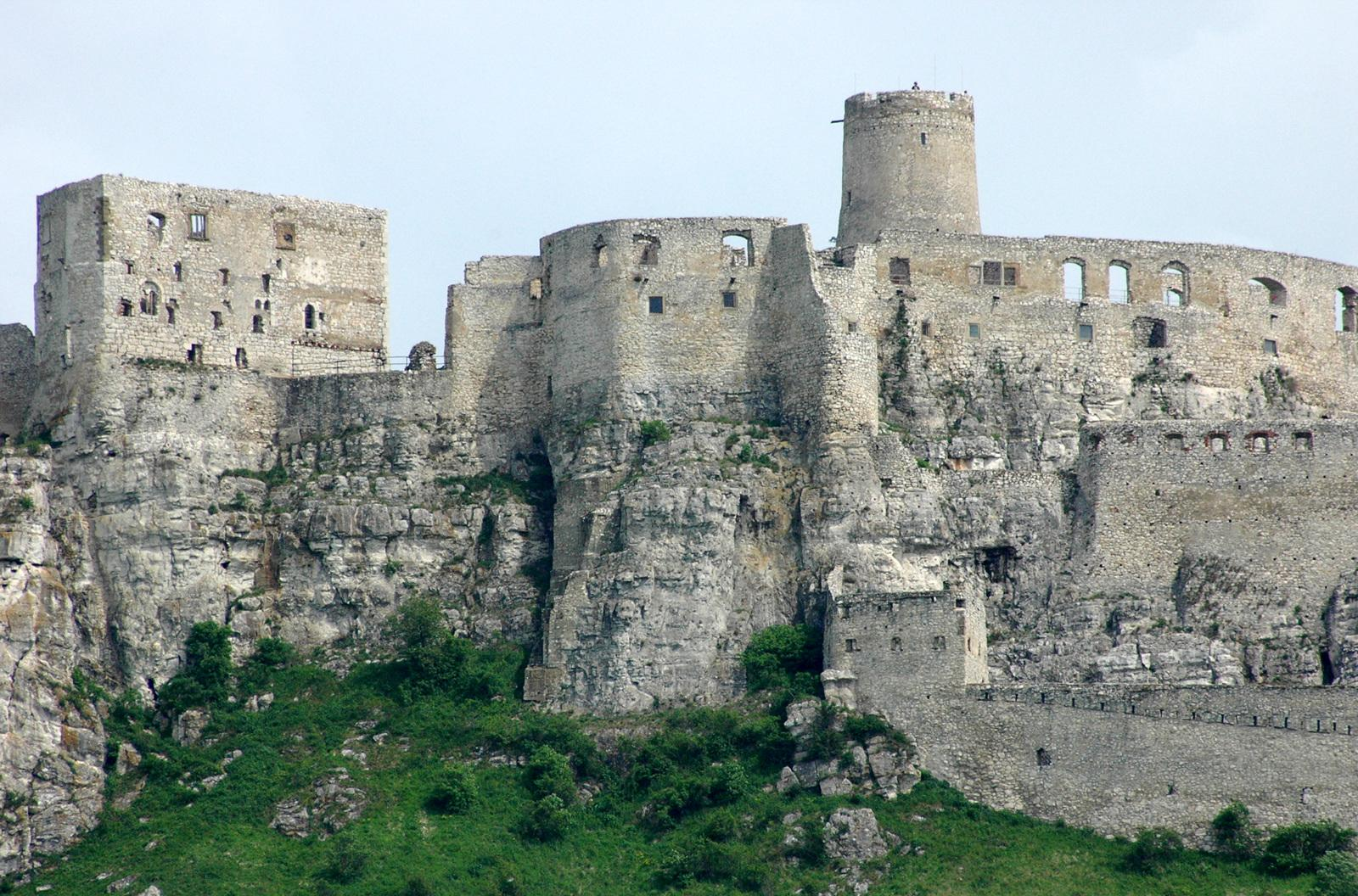
Spiš castle - the central part

=== Origins ===
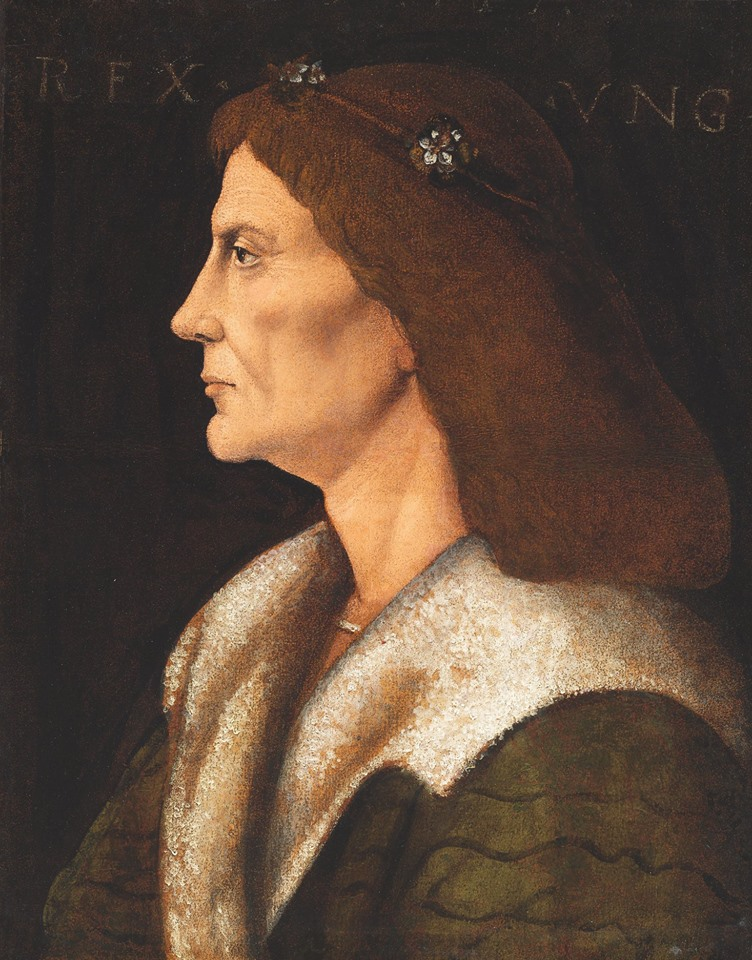
Matthias Corvinus, the last royal owner

Construction of the medieval castle on a travertine (limestone) hill dates back to the beginning of the 12th century. The oldest written reference to the castle is from 1120. At the beginning it was a boundary fort placed at the northern frontier of Kingdom of Hungary. Afterwards, it became the seat of the head of Szepes county for many centuries. It was the political, administrative, economic and cultural center of Szepes County of the Kingdom of Hungary. Before 1464, it was owned by the kings of Hungary, until the time of King Matthias Corvinus, then (until 1528) by the Zápolya family, the Thurzó family (1531–1635), the Csáky family (1638–1945), and (since 1945) by the state of Czechoslovakia and then Slovakia.

Originally a Romanesque stone castle with fortifications, a two-story Romanesque palace and a three-nave Romanesque-Gothic basilica were constructed by the second half of the thirteenth century. A second extramural settlement was built in the fourteenth century, by which the castle area was doubled. The castle was completely rebuilt in the fifteenth century; the castle walls were heightened and a third extramural settlement was constructed. A late Gothic chapel was added around 1470. The Zápolya clan performed late Gothic transformations, which made the upper castle into a comfortable family residence, typical of late Renaissance residences of the sixteenth and seventeenth centuries.

=== Decline and reconstruction ===
The last owners of the Spiš Castle, the Csáky family, abandoned the castle in the early eighteenth century because they considered it too uncomfortable to live in. They moved to the newly built nearby village castles/palaces in Hodkovce near Žehra and Spišský Hrhov.

In 1780, the castle was destroyed in a fire. The cause of the blaze is unknown, but there are a few theories. One is that the Csáky family purposefully burned it down to reduce taxes as at the time additional taxes applied to roofed buildings. Another is that it was struck by lightning, which started the fire. A third is that some soldiers in the castle were making moonshine and in the process accidentally started the fire. Whatever the case, after the fire, the castle was no longer occupied and began to fall into disrepair.

The castle was partly reconstructed in the second half of the twentieth century, and extensive archaeological research was carried out on the site. The reconstructed sections house displays of the Spiš Museum, which is responsible for managing the castle, and artefacts such as torture devices formerly used in the castle. As of 2026 the castle is closed for reconstruction.

== Image gallery ==
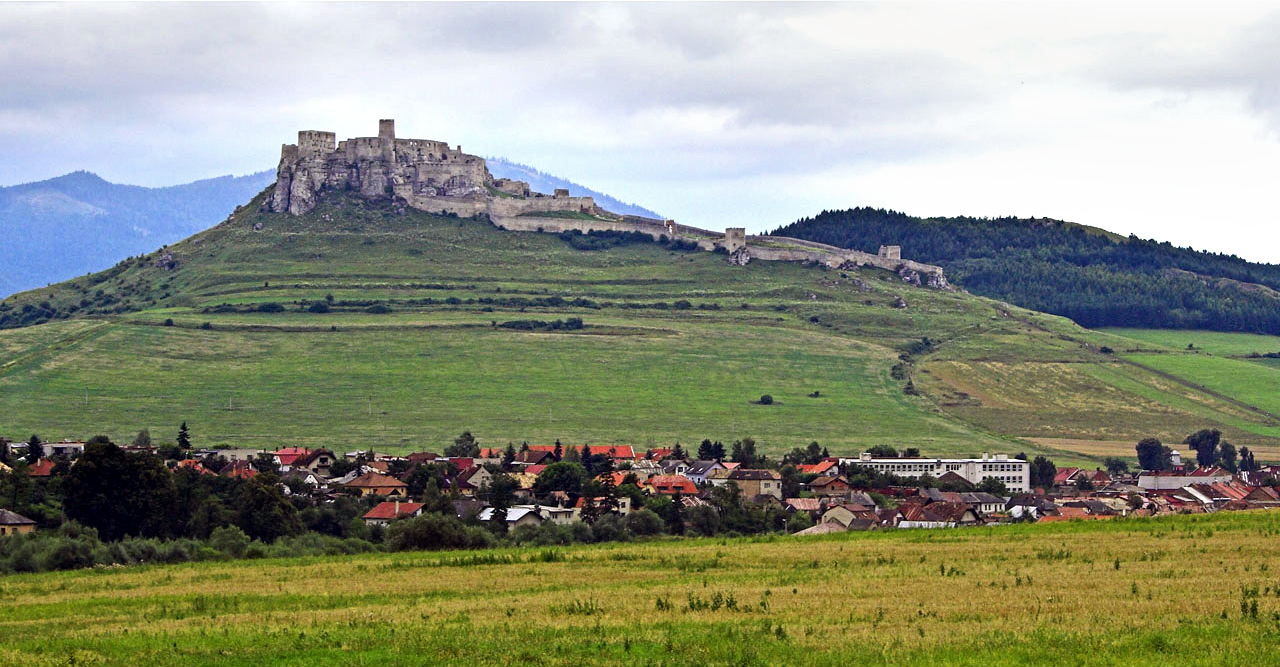
Overall view of the castle

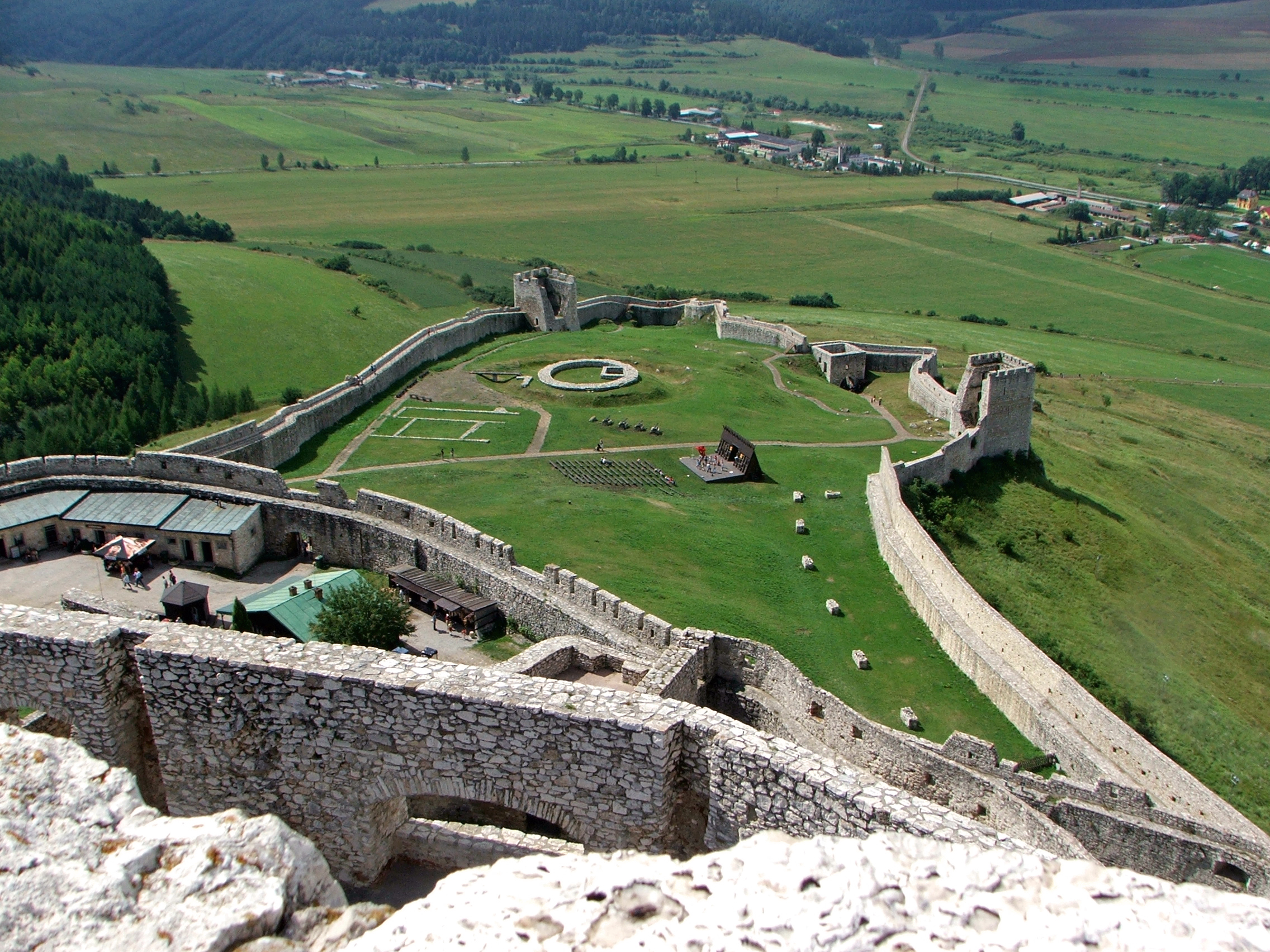
Lower fortifications

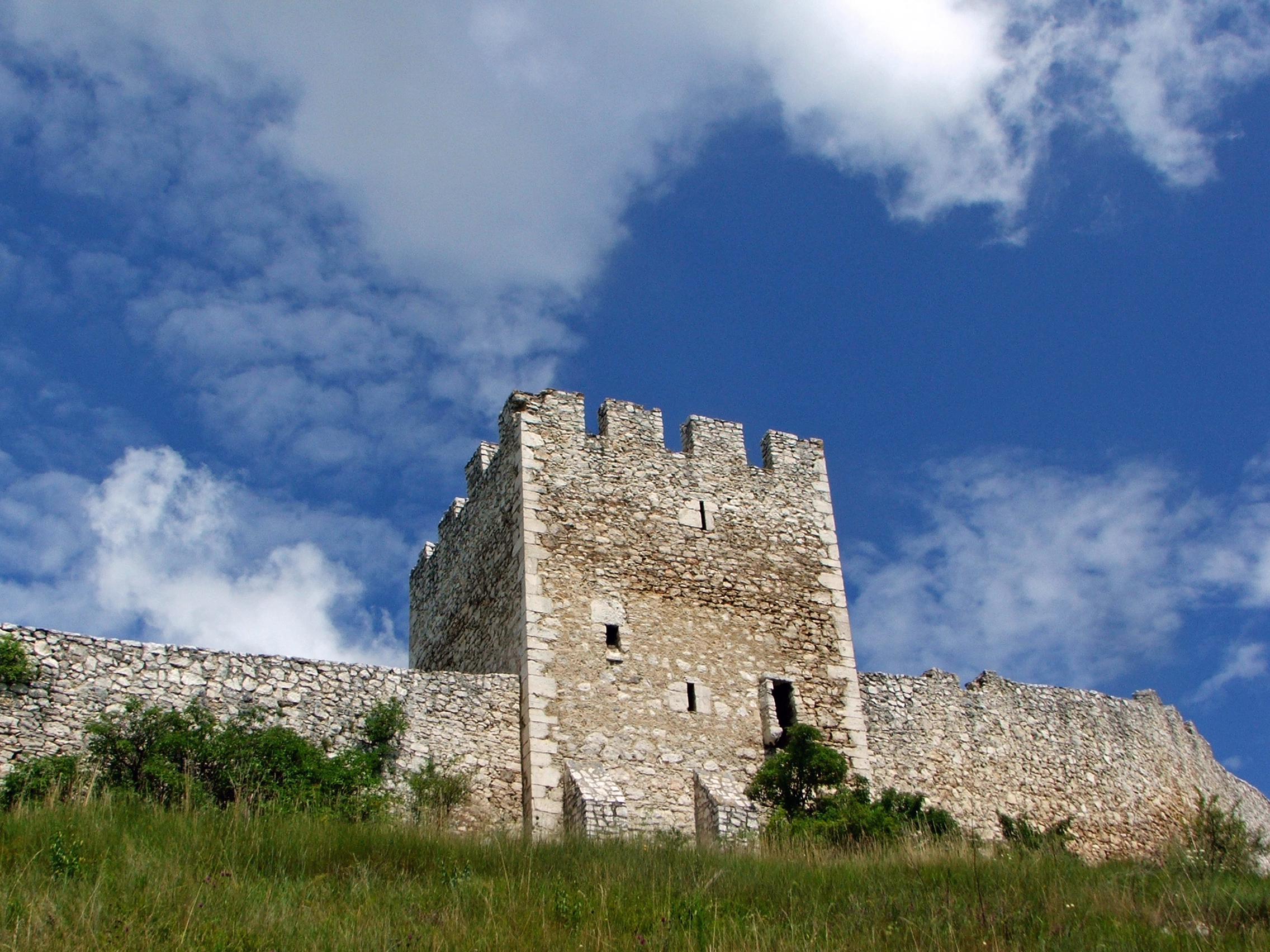
Wall and tower

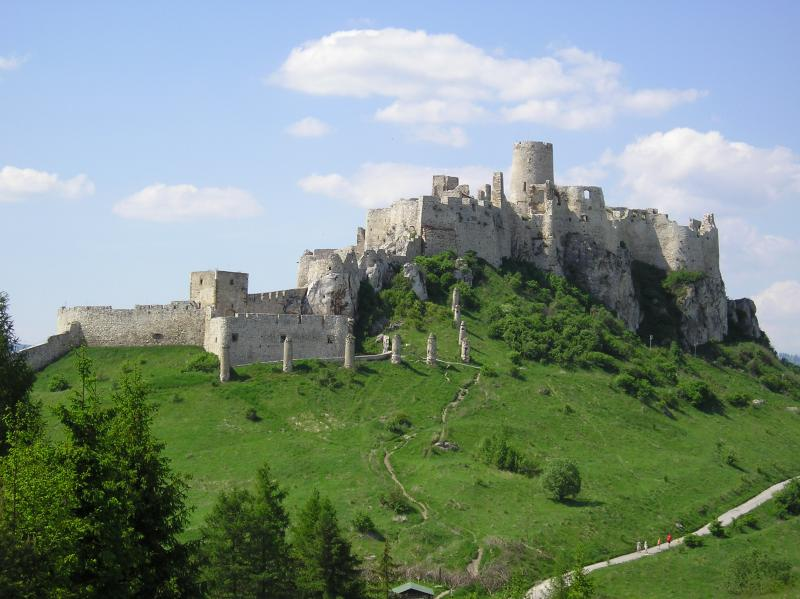
View from east

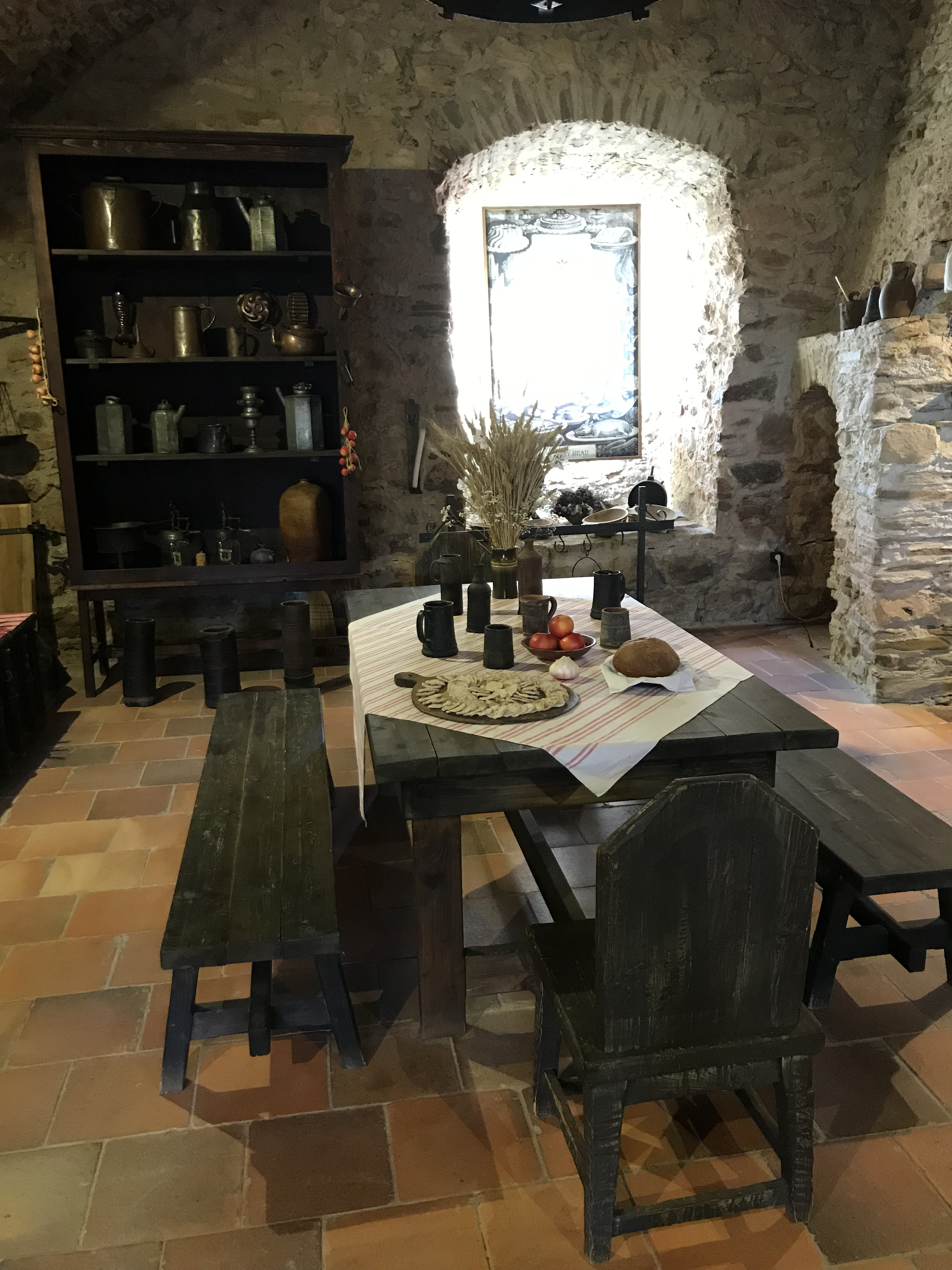
Museum exposition in castle
