= Protected areas of Hungary =

The Protected areas of Hungary include 10 national parks, 35 landscape protection areas and 145 minor nature reserves. The national policy for governing and management of the protected areas is implemented by the Minister of Agriculture (State Secretary for the Environment). The first national park in Hungary at the Great Hungarian Plain is Hortobágy National Park, established in 1973.

Types of protected areas:

- National Park (Hungarian: Nemzeti park; abbr. NP)
- Protected Landscape Area (Hungarian: Tájvédelmi körzet; abbr. TK)
- National Nature Reserve or nature conservation area (Hungarian: Természetvédelmi terület; abbr. TT)

== National Parks ==
Location of the National Parks of Hungary

There were 10 national parks in Hungary (IUCN Category II) as of 2014.

World Heritage Site or part of a World Heritage Site

Name	Area (km²)	Established	Seat	Link
Hortobágy	809.572	1973	Debrecen	hnp.hu
Kiskunság	506.410	1975	Kecskemét	knp.nemzetipark.gov.hu
Bükk	422.834	1977	Eger	bnpi.hu
Aggtelek	201.837	1985	Jósvafő	anp.hu
Fertő-Hanság	238.913	1991	Sarród	ferto-hansag.hu
Danube-Drava	497.516	1996	Pécs	ddnp.hu
Körös-Maros	512.465	1997	Szarvas	kmnp.hu
Balaton Uplands	570.190	1997	Csopak	bfnp.hu
Danube-Ipoly	606.760	1997	Esztergom / Budapest	dunaipoly.hu
Őrség	440.483	2002	Őriszentpéter	orseginemzetipark.hu

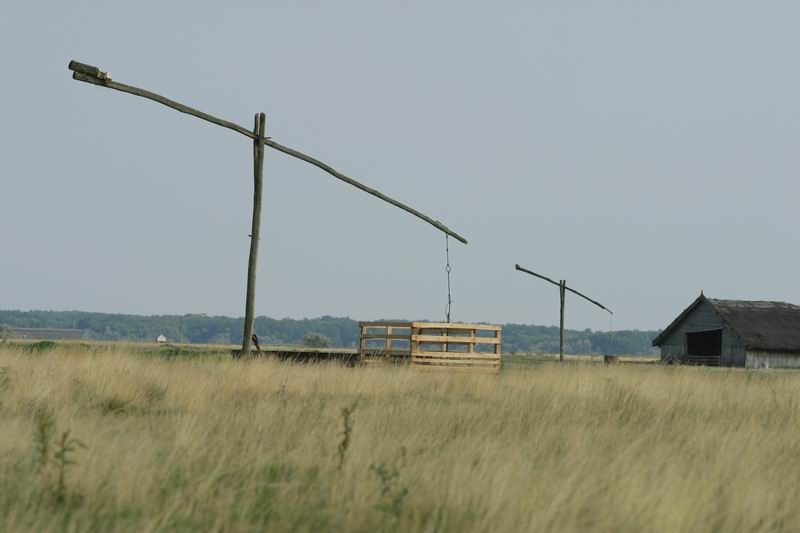
Hortobágy NP

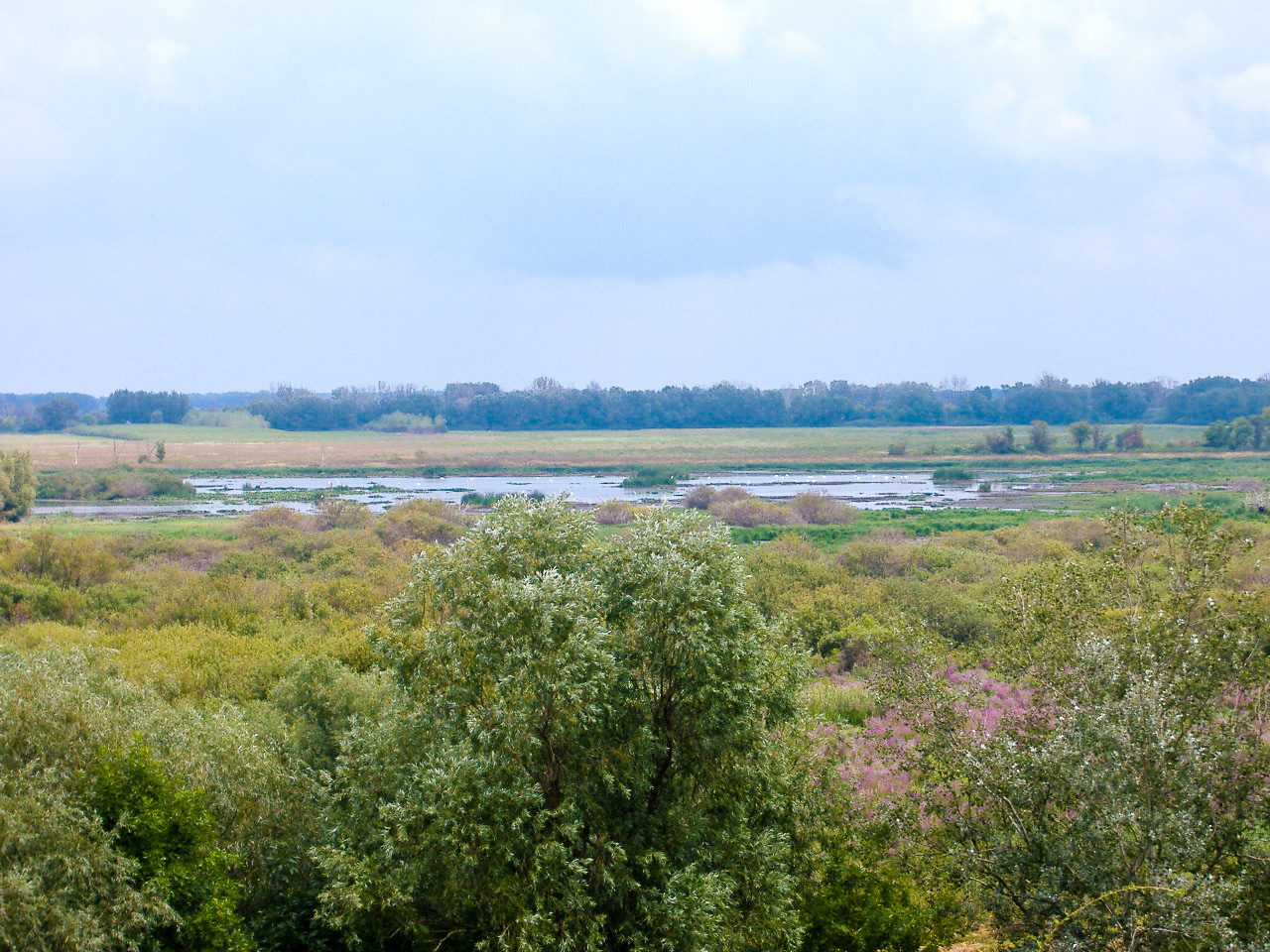
Kiskunság NP

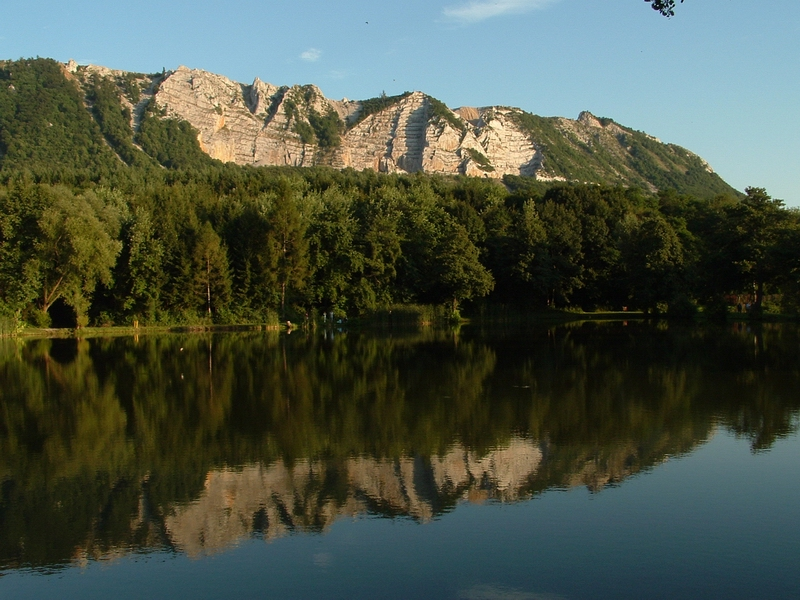
Bükk NP

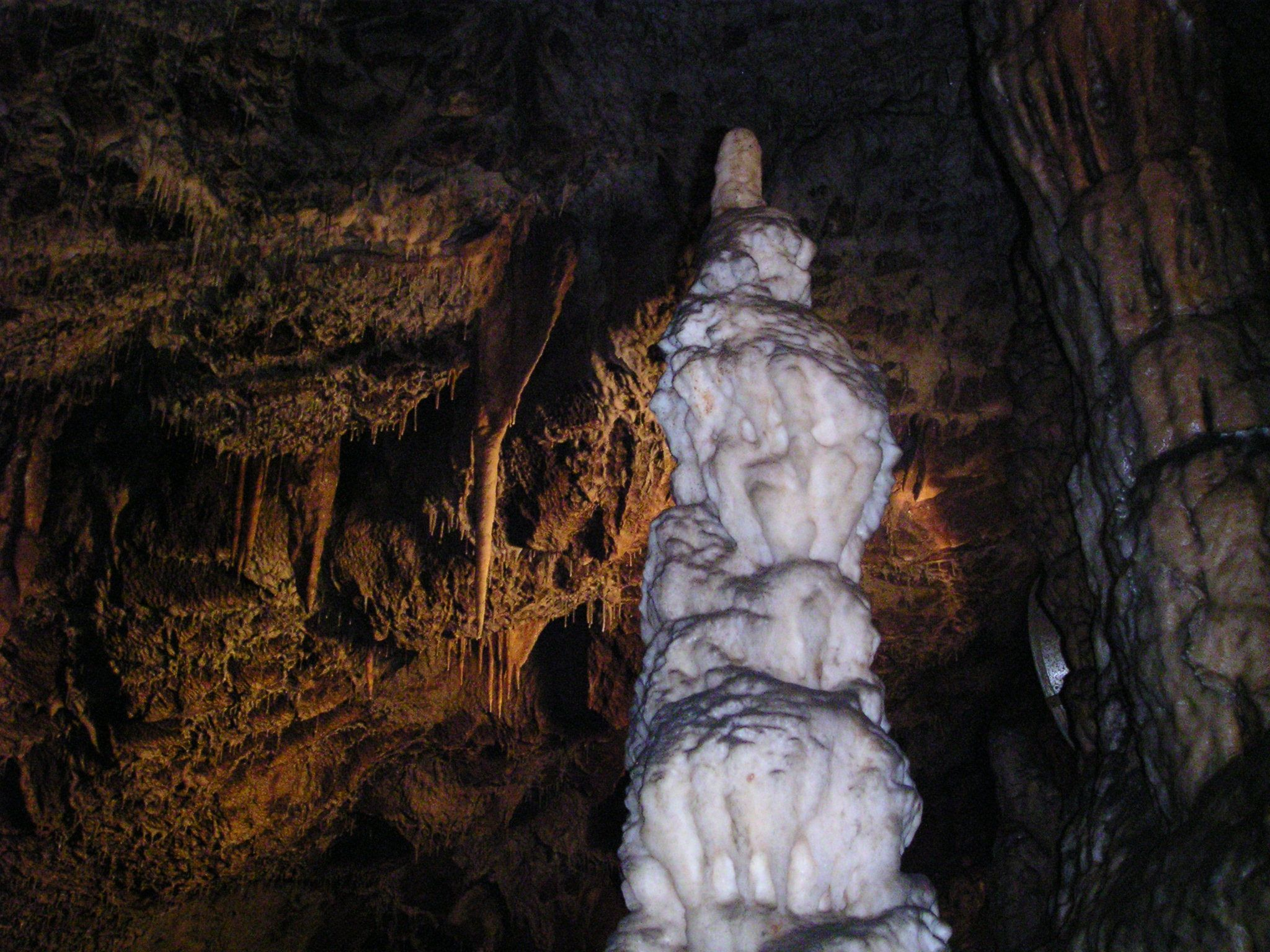
Aggtelek NP

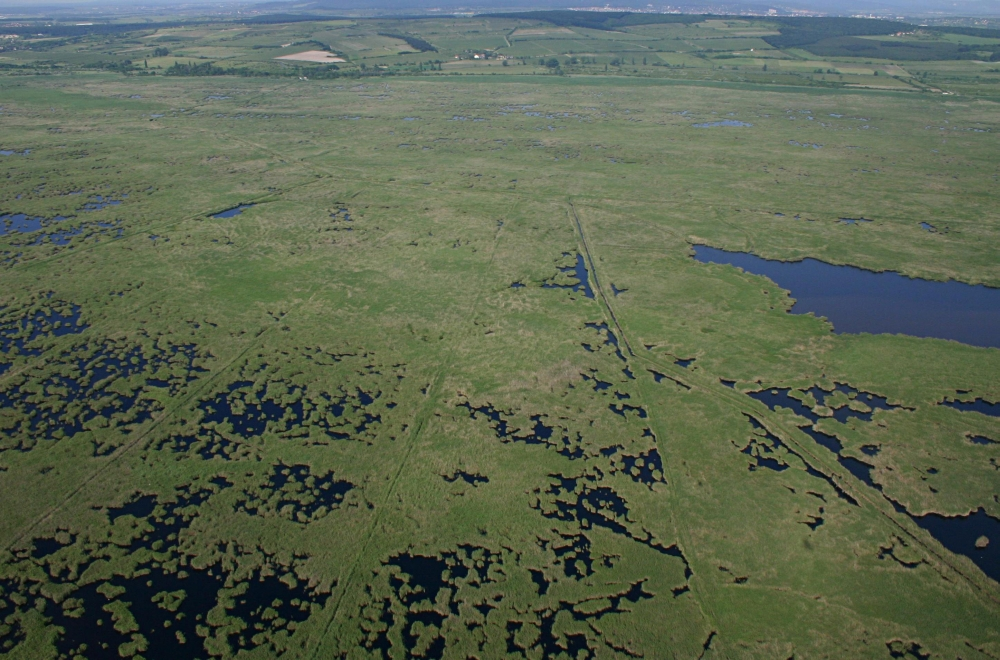
Fertő-Hanság NP

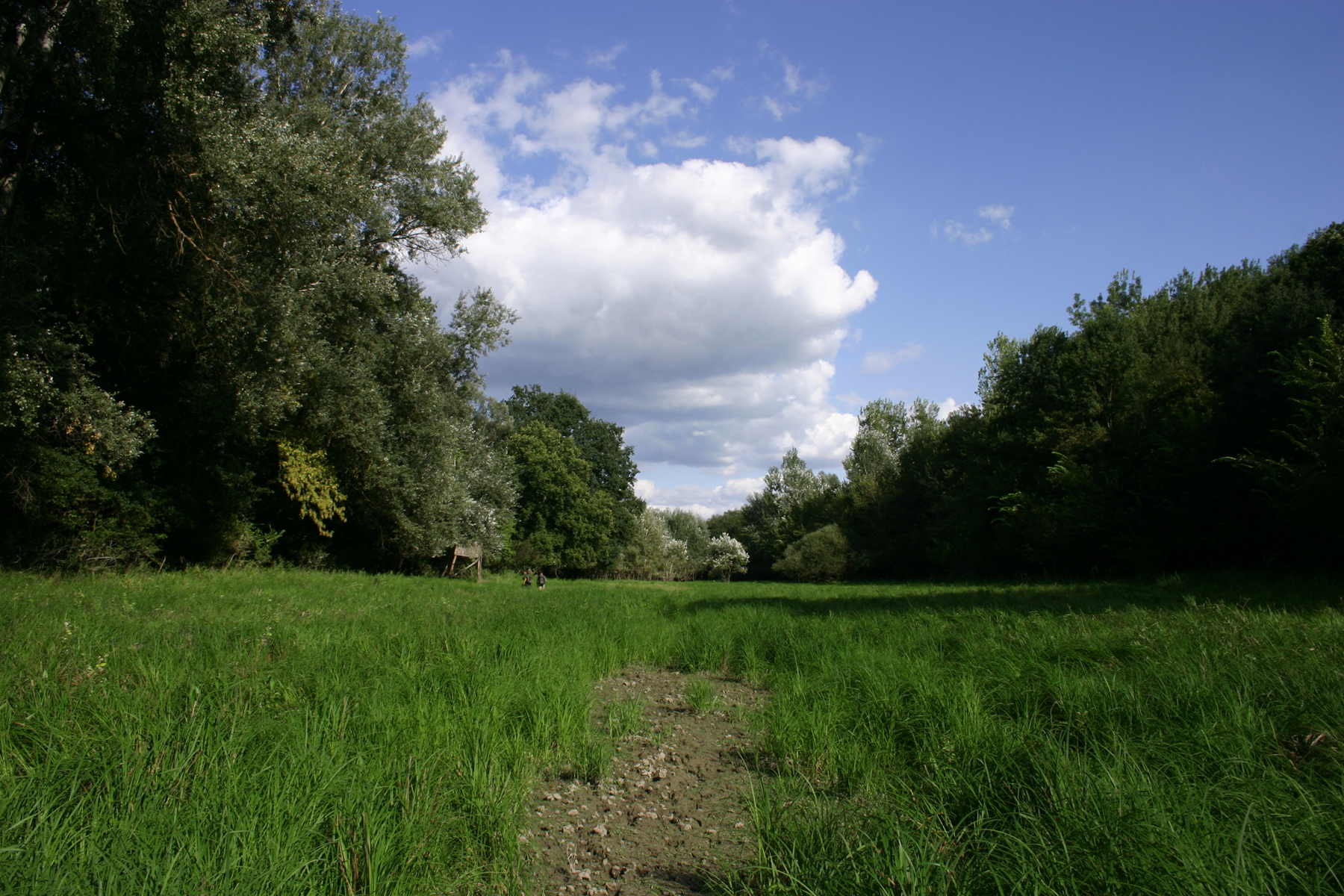
Danube-Drava NP

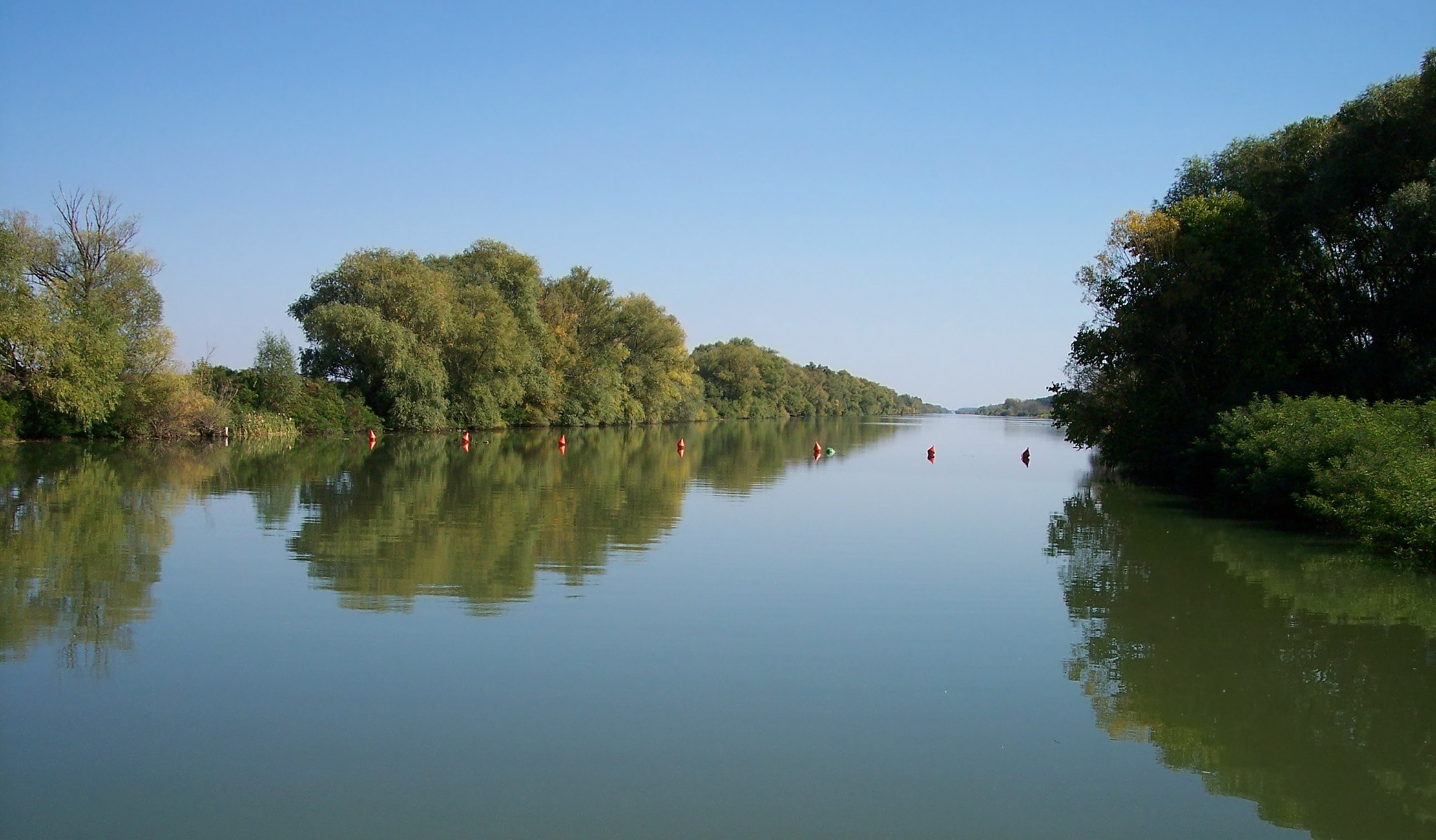
Körös-Maros NP

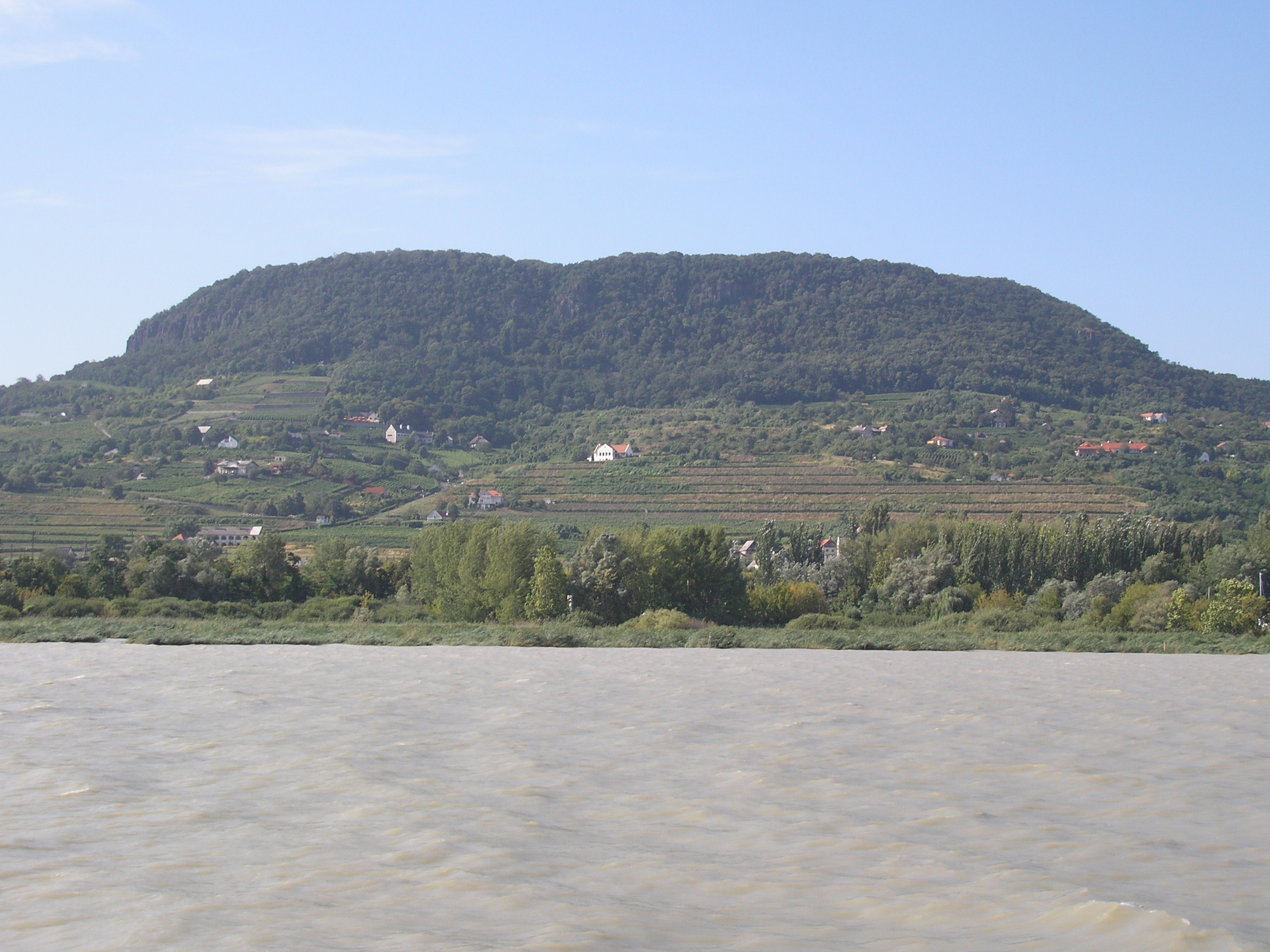
Balaton Uplands NP

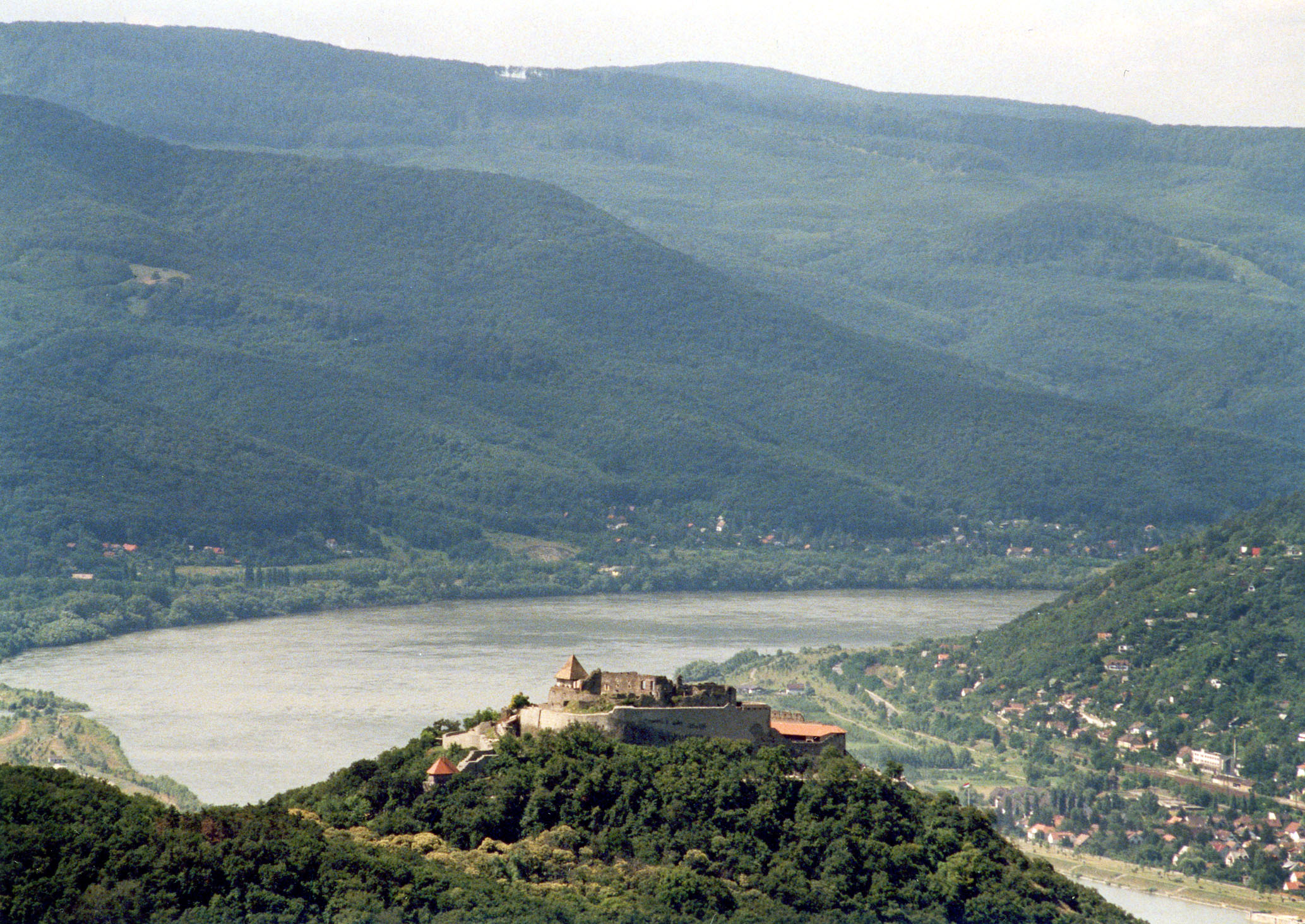
Danube-Ipoly NP

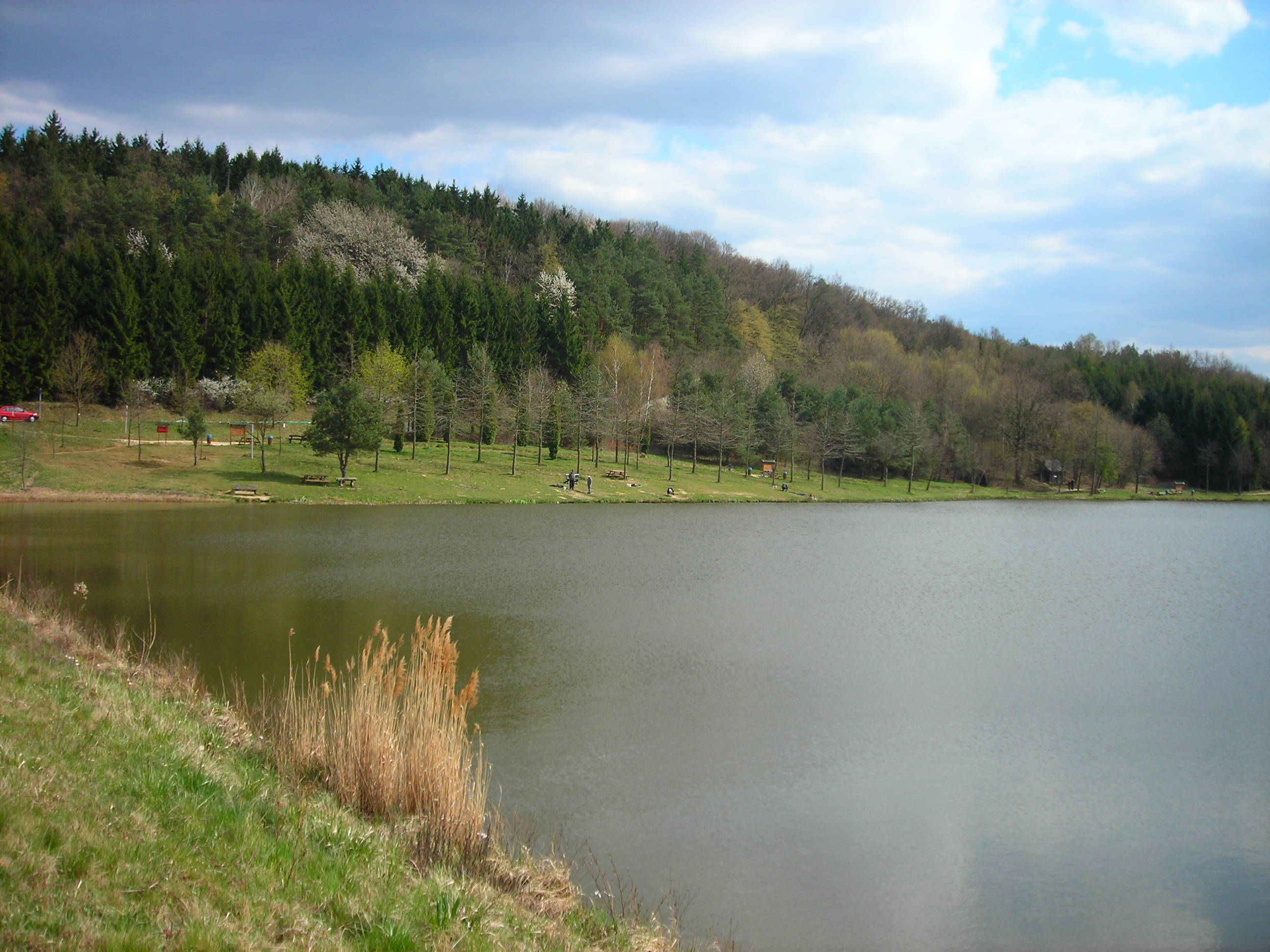
Őrség NP

== Protected Landscape Area ==
Hungary has 35 Landscape Protection Areas in Hungary (IUCN Category V) as of 2014.

Name	Area (ha)	Established	City/Municipality	National Park
Tokaj-Bodrogzug	4,242	1986	Tokaj	Aggtelek
Zemplén	26,496	1984	Gönc, Hollóháza	Aggtelek
High Bakony	8,753	1991	Bakonybél, Zirc	Balaton Uplands
Mura area	1,904	2007	Letenye	Balaton Uplands
Somló Hill	585	1983	Somlószőlős	Balaton Uplands
Borsodi Mezőség	17,932	1989	Mezőkövesd	Bükk
Heves steppes	15,805	1993	Poroszló, Füzesabony	Bükk
Hollókő	150	1977	Hollókő	Bükk
Karancs-Medves	6,619	1989	Salgótarján	Bükk
East Cserhát	7,425	1989	Pásztó	Bükk
Kesznyéten	6,084	1990	Kesznyéten	Bükk
Lázbérc	4,054	1975	Lázbérc	Bükk
Mátra	12 179	1985	Parád, Gyöngyös	Bükk
Tarna area	9,570	1993	Pétervására	Bükk
Boronka	8,232	1989	Marcali	Danube-Drava
South Mezőföld	7,547	1999	Cece	Danube-Drava
East Mecsek	9,348	1977	Bonyhád, Pécsvárad	Danube-Drava
West Mecsek	10,316	2009	Abaliget, Pécs	Danube-Drava
Zselic	8,337	1976	Kaposvár	Danube-Drava
Buda	10,528	1978	Pilisszentiván	Danube-Ipoly
Gerecse	8,739	1977	Tata	Danube-Ipoly
Gödöllő Hills	11,801	1990	Gödöllő	Danube-Ipoly
Ócsa	3,575	1975	Ócsa	Danube-Ipoly
Sárrét	2,211	1986	Csór, Székesfehérvár	Danube-Ipoly
Sárvíz (Sió) Valley	3,650	1997	Soponya, Székesfehérvár	Danube-Ipoly
Tápió-Hajta region	4,515	1998	Nagykáta, Farmos	Danube-Ipoly
Vértes	15,000	1976	Csákvár, Székesfehérvár	Danube-Ipoly
Pannonhalma	8,272	1992	Pannonhalma	Fertő-Hanság
Sopron	4,891	1977	Sopron, Ágfalva, Harka	Fertő-Hanság
Szigetköz	9,157	1987	Lipót, Mosonmagyaróvár	Fertő-Hanság
Bihar plane	17,095	1998	Berettyóújfalu, Komádi	Hortobágy
Hajdúság	7,000	1988	Vámospércs, Debrecen	Hortobágy
Upper Tisza	9,294	1978	Nagykörű, Szolnok, Tiszaug	Hortobágy
Szatmár-Bereg plane	22,931	1982	Füzesgyarmat, Tarpa	Hortobágy
Mártély	17,095	1971	Mártély, Hódmezővásárhely	Kiskunság
Pusztaszer	22,151	1976	Ópusztaszer, Sándorfalva	Kiskunság
Kőszeg	4,200	1980	Kőszeg	Őrség
Ság Hill	235	1975	Celldömölk	Őrség

=== National Nature Reserve ===
- Aggtelek NP (5):
  - Abaújkéri Sóstói-legelő TT
  - Edelényi Nőszirmos TT
  - Keleméri Mohos-tavak TT
  - Long-erdő TT
  - Rudabányai Őshominoidea Lelőhely TT
- Balaton Uplands NP (27):
  - Atyai-láprét TT
  - Bakonygyepesi Zergebogláros TT
  - Balatonfüredi-erdő TT
  - Balatonkenesei Tátorjános TT
  - Darvas-tói Lefejtett Bauxitlencse TT
  - Devecseri Széki-erdő TT
  - Farkasgyepűi kísérleti erdő TT
  - Fenyőfői ősfenyves TT
  - Hévízi-tó TT
  - Hódoséri ciklámenes TT
  - Keszthelyi Kastélypark TT
  - Látrány-puszta TT
  - Nagybereki Fehérvíz TT
  - Nyirádi Sár-álló TT
  - Sárosfői Halastavak TT
  - Somlóvásárhelyi Holt-tó TT
  - Somogyvári Kupavár-hegy TT
  - Sümegi Fehér kövek TT és erdőrezervátum
  - Sümegi Mogyorós-domb TT
  - Szentgáli Tiszafás TT
  - Tapolcafői Láprét TT
  - Tapolcai-Tavasbarlang felszíne
  - Úrkúti-Őskarszt TT
  - Uzsai Csarabos TT
  - Várpalotai Homokbánya TT
  - Zalakomári Madárrezervátum TT
  - Zirc Arboretum TT
