= Kinga Székely =

Hungarian speleologist, geographer and cartographer (born 1945)

Kinga Székely (born 27 September 1945) is a Hungarian speleologist, geographer and cartographer. She is responsible for numerous maps and discoveries of Hungarian caves and the creation of databases to inventory and study them. She was instrumental in the declaration by the United Nations that made the Aggtelek Karst and the Slovak Karst World Heritage Sites.

== Biography ==
Székely was born in Pécs, Hungary, on 27 September 1945, and graduated from the Móricz Zsigmond Gymnasium in Budapest in 1964. She graduated from the Faculty of Geography and Cartography of Eötvös Loránd University in 1976. In 1973, she spent an academic year at Jagiellonian University in Krakow, where she studied karst geomorphology. From 1968 to 1978, she worked as the secretary of the Hungarian Karst and Speleological Society. From 1978, she was an employee of the Speleological Institute (Department) operating within the Nature Conservation Office. Beginning in 1986, she was its deputy head, and from 1990 until her retirement in 2002, she was its head. She has been a member of the Hungarian Karst and Speleological Society since 1960 and has been an honorary member of the Society since 2012.

== Scientific career ==
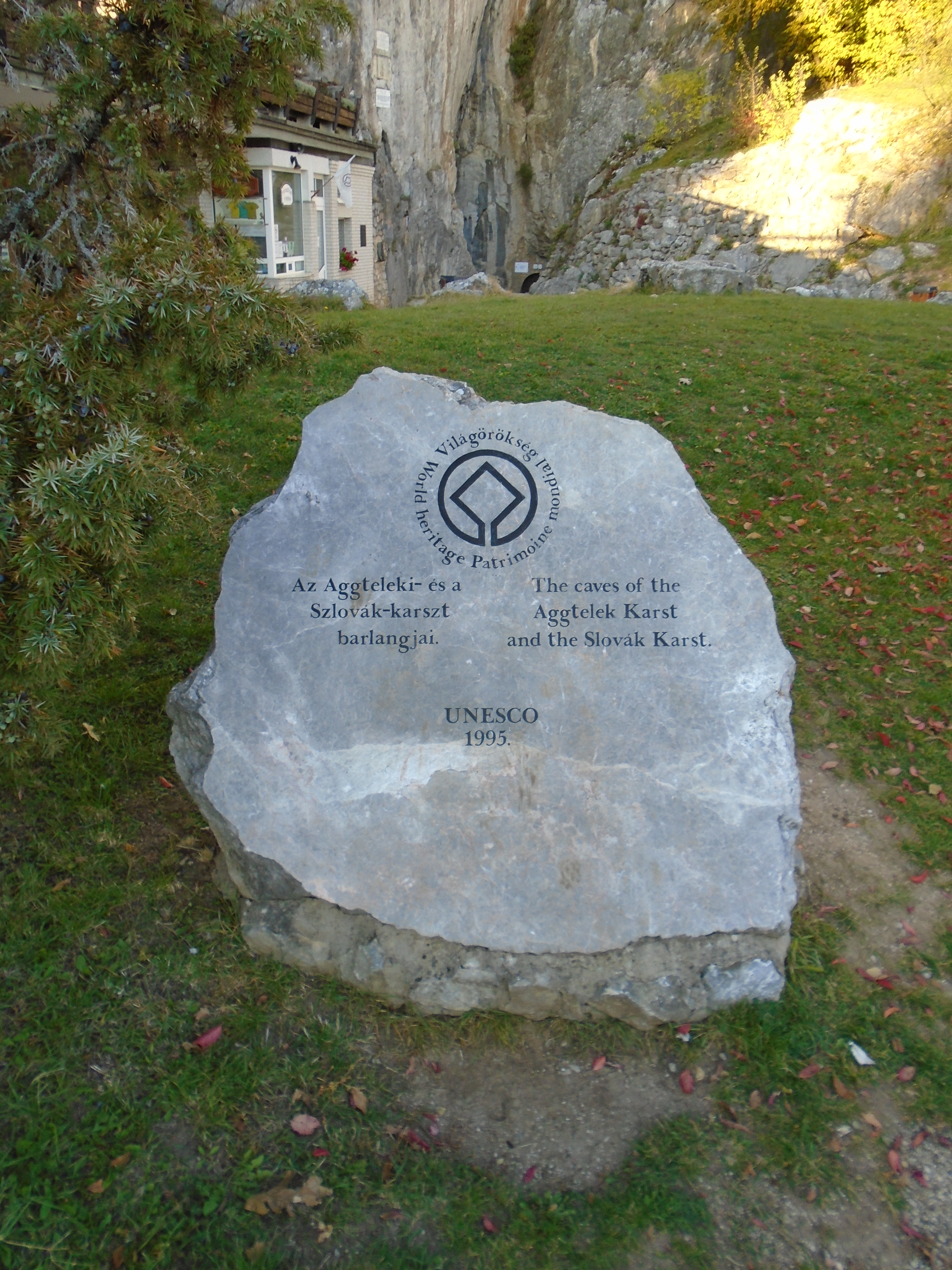
World Heritage memorial for Aggtelek Karst

Among other things, she participated in the excavation of the Lower Mountain caves in the 1960s. In 1968, she was one of the surveyors of the Szabó-Pallagi caves. In 1981, she developed and maintained the national cave registry system and managed its database for more than two decades. She also created the computer database of the Hungarian speleological bibliography, which today contains more than 10,000 entries. She helped to prepare the groundwork for laws dealing with cave protection published since 1982, and in the acceptance of the justification for the proposal necessary for declaring the Aggtelek Karst and the Slovak Karst as United Nations World Heritage Sites. She advocated for the recognition of the right to build structures inside caves to protect visitors and the development of technical standards related to caves. She supervised the reconstruction of caves built for tourism on the same principles.

From 1968 to 1993, she was the editor of Karst and Cave. She also edited the publication Speleotéka, which was published for the first and only time in 1990. Her co-editor was Sándor Hadobás.

She published almost 200 educational and professional papers dealing with the caves of Hungary, the protection of caves, the history of speleology, and the biographies of speleologists. In 1989, she organized an exhibition entitled Caves in the Arts at the Kiscell Museum in Budapest, featuring drawings and paintings by renowned artists from Hungary, the Czech Republic and Slovakia. She was a member of several international speleological expeditions (Lake Baikal in 1988, Kyrgyzstan 1989, Far East 1990).

== Personal life ==
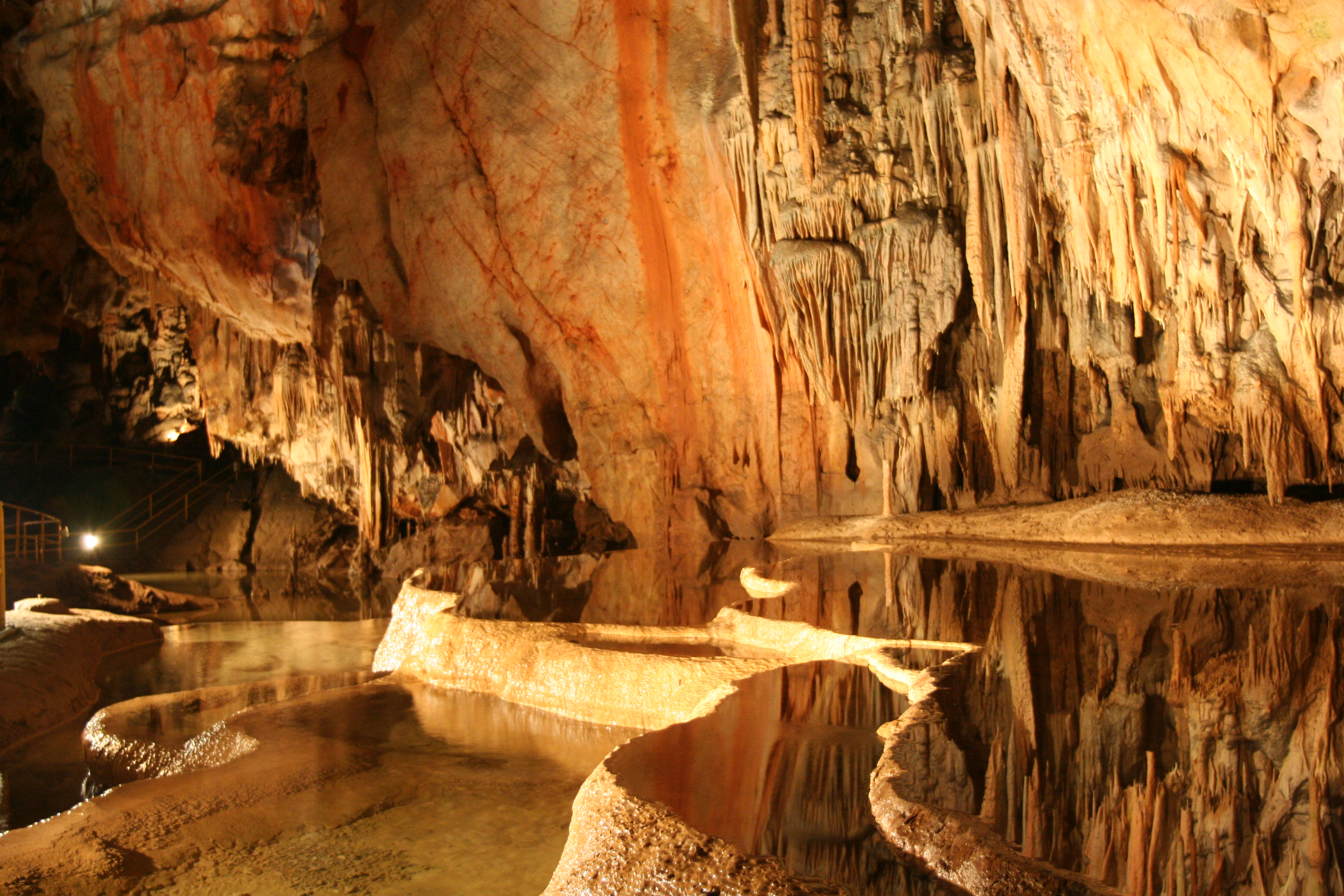
Baradla Cave, studied by Kinga Székely

Székely has remained active and in 2023 gave a public lecture about Sándor Petőfi's visit to the Baradla Cave.

== Selected honors ==
- Life-Saving Memorial Medal government award (1969) for work in the Cave Rescue Service
- Otto Herman Medal (1978)
- Commemorative plaque of the Association of Technical and Natural Science Associations (1992) for activities in the Hungarian Karst and Speleological Society
- Commemorative Medal of the Slovak Museum of Speleology and Nature Conservation (1995) for historical research into caves
- Pro Natura Award (2001) for cave protection
- Dénes Balázs Memorial Plaque (2004) for her assistance in establishing the Hungarian Geographical Museum
- István Schönvisner Memorial Medal (2008)
- Hungarian Republic Golden Cross of Merit (2009)
- Ferenc Papp Medal (2010)
- Kadić Ottokár Medal (2018)
