= List of national parks of Hungary =

Hungary has ten national parks which cover approximately 10 percent of the country's territory. The parks are managed by the National Parks of Hungary government agency (Hungarian: Nemzeti park igazgatóság).

World Heritage Site or part of a World Heritage Site

Photo	Name	Established	Area	Seat	Map	Symbol
	Hortobágy National Park	1973 (January 1)	809.572 km^{2} (312.577 sq mi)	Debrecen	List of national parks of Hungary is located in Hungary	Common crane
	Kiskunság National Park	1975 (January 1)	506.410 km^{2} (195.526 sq mi)	Kecskemét	List of national parks of Hungary is located in Hungary	Sand dune landscape
	Bükk National Park	1977 (January 1)	422.834 km^{2} (163.257 sq mi)	Eger (Felnémet)	List of national parks of Hungary is located in Hungary	Carlina acaulis
	Aggtelek National Park	1985 (January 1)	201.837 km^{2} (77.930 sq mi)	Jósvafő	List of national parks of Hungary is located in Hungary	Fire salamander
	Fertő-Hanság National Park	1991 (January 1)	238.913 km^{2} (92.245 sq mi)	Sarród	List of national parks of Hungary is located in Hungary	Great egret
	Danube-Drava National Park	1996 (January 1)	497.516 km^{2} (192.092 sq mi)	Pécs	List of national parks of Hungary is located in Hungary	Flora, Danube and Drava
	Körös-Maros National Park	1997 (January 16)	512.465 km^{2} (197.864 sq mi)	Szarvas	List of national parks of Hungary is located in Hungary	Great bustard
	Balaton Uplands National Park	1997	570.190 km^{2} (220.152 sq mi)	Csopak	List of national parks of Hungary is located in Hungary	Butte, Primula farinosa and Water
	Danube-Ipoly National Park	1997	606.760 km^{2} (234.271 sq mi)	Budapest and Esztergom	List of national parks of Hungary is located in Hungary	Rosalia longicorn
	Őrség National Park	2002	440.483 km^{2} (170.071 sq mi)	Őriszentpéter	List of national parks of Hungary is located in Hungary	Western capercaillie and Daphne cneorum

== See also ==
- Protected areas of Hungary
