= Domica Cave =

Cave and archaeological site in Slovakia

UNESCO World Heritage Site
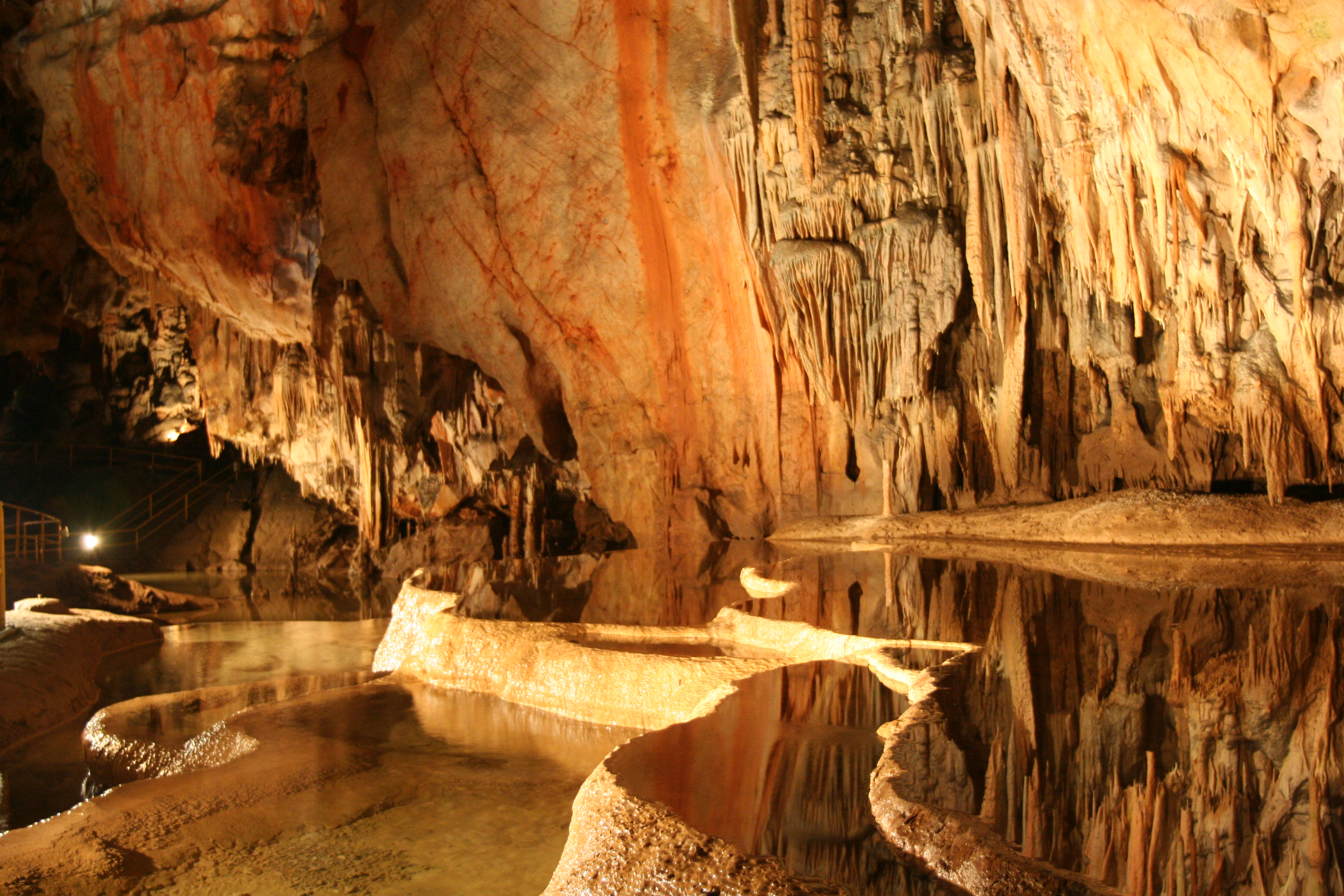

- Location within Košice Region Location within Slovakia
- Location: Rožňava District, Slovakia
- Part of: Caves of Aggtelek Karst and Slovak Karst
- Criteria: Natural: (viii)
- Reference: 725ter
- Inscription: 1995 (19th Session)
- Extensions: 2000, 2008
- Coordinates: 48°28′36″N 20°28′21″E

Ramsar Wetland
- Official name: Domica
- Designated: 2 February 2001
- Reference no.: 1051

The Domica cave is a karst cave situated on the south-western border of the Silicka planina Plateau 10 km (6.2 mi) south-east of Plesivec in the Rožňava District of the Košice Region in southern Slovakia. In combination with the Baradla cave, it makes up the most significant section of the Aggtelek Karst and Slovak Karst cross-border cave network that continues into the Aggtelek National Park in Hungary. The cave is well known for its complex structure and high density of speleothems.

These vast limestone passages, that had formed during the Middle Triassic and are rich in speleothems were discovered in 1926 by Ján Majko. A 1,600 m (5,200 ft) section of its total length of 5,140 m (16,860 ft) has been publicly accessible since 1932.

As an element of the Caves of Aggtelek Karst and Slovak Karst the site was listed as a UNESCO World Heritage Site list in 1995 because of the diversity of cave features found within it and its record of both tropical and temperate effects on karst cave formation.

== Exploration ==
The site belongs to a complex variety of karstic formations that include 712 caves, many of which were well known among the local population for centuries. Bartholomeides, a priest from Ochtiná, documented his first systematic excursions into the Certova diera Cave in 1801. His conclusions that a number of the local caves are simply parts of a bigger entity were corroborated by the explorer I.Vass, who surveyed the Baradla cave in 1821. E.Nyari took up archaeological work in 1881 and suggested a connection of the Certova diera and Baradla Cave as did K. Siegmenth in 1891. Only the extensive work of Jan Majko in 1926 confirmed the interconnection of several local caves and lead to the discovery of the Domica cave on October 3, 1926. J. Majko penetrated from its bottom through a 15 m deep abyss into large underground spaces in 1926 where plenty of archaeological discoveries were made later.

== Description ==
The Domica Cave is situated in the Slovak karst and consists of light limestone of the Middle Triassic. The passages were shaped by the waters of an underground river, called Styx. Speleothem decoration is omnipresent and very impressive, including cascades of stalactite lakes, variously shaped stalactites domed temples and notably bat guano, that had diffused into sinter crusts accounts for unique forms and textures of surface decoration.

Karst processes have over tens of millions of years created diverse structures and habitats that date back to the Late Cretaceous. Subsequent periods of temperate, glacial, subtropical and tropical climatic conditions excellently demonstrate karst formation under varying conditions. Biologists, geologists and paleontologists are confronted with a rich set of various conditions, that affect sedimentation, evolution and fossilization in a geological time frame.

=== Gallery ===
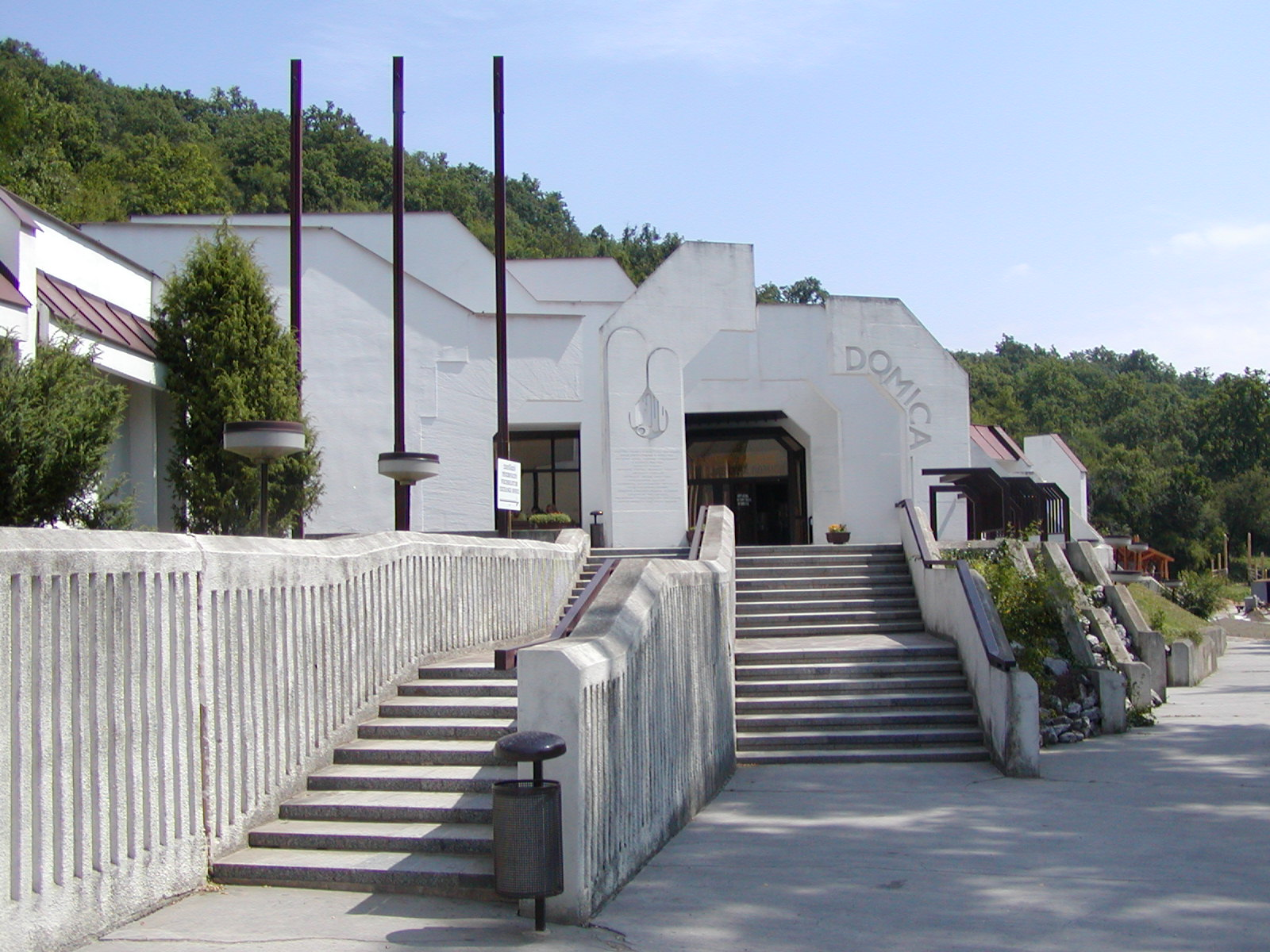
Entrance

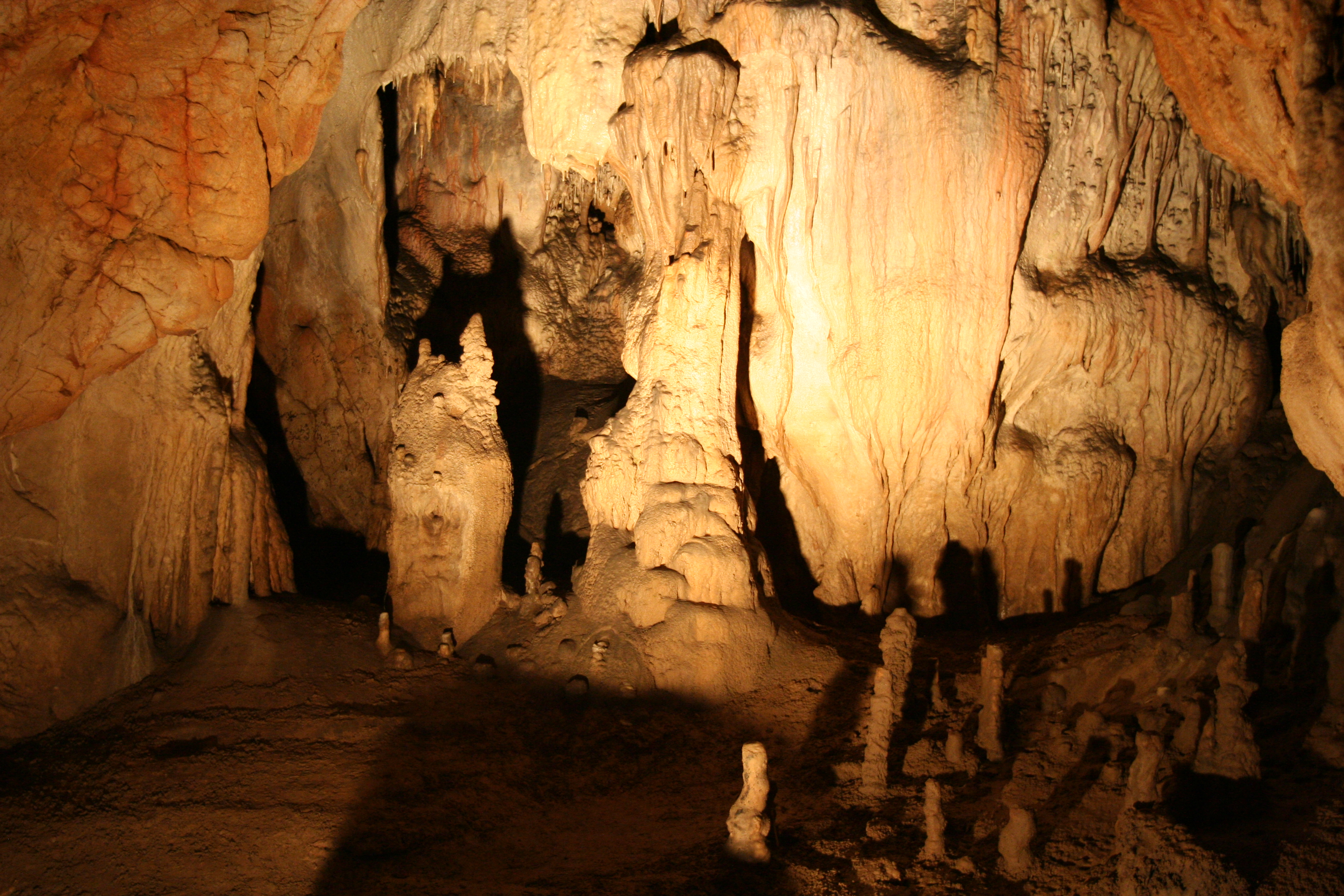
Speleothems

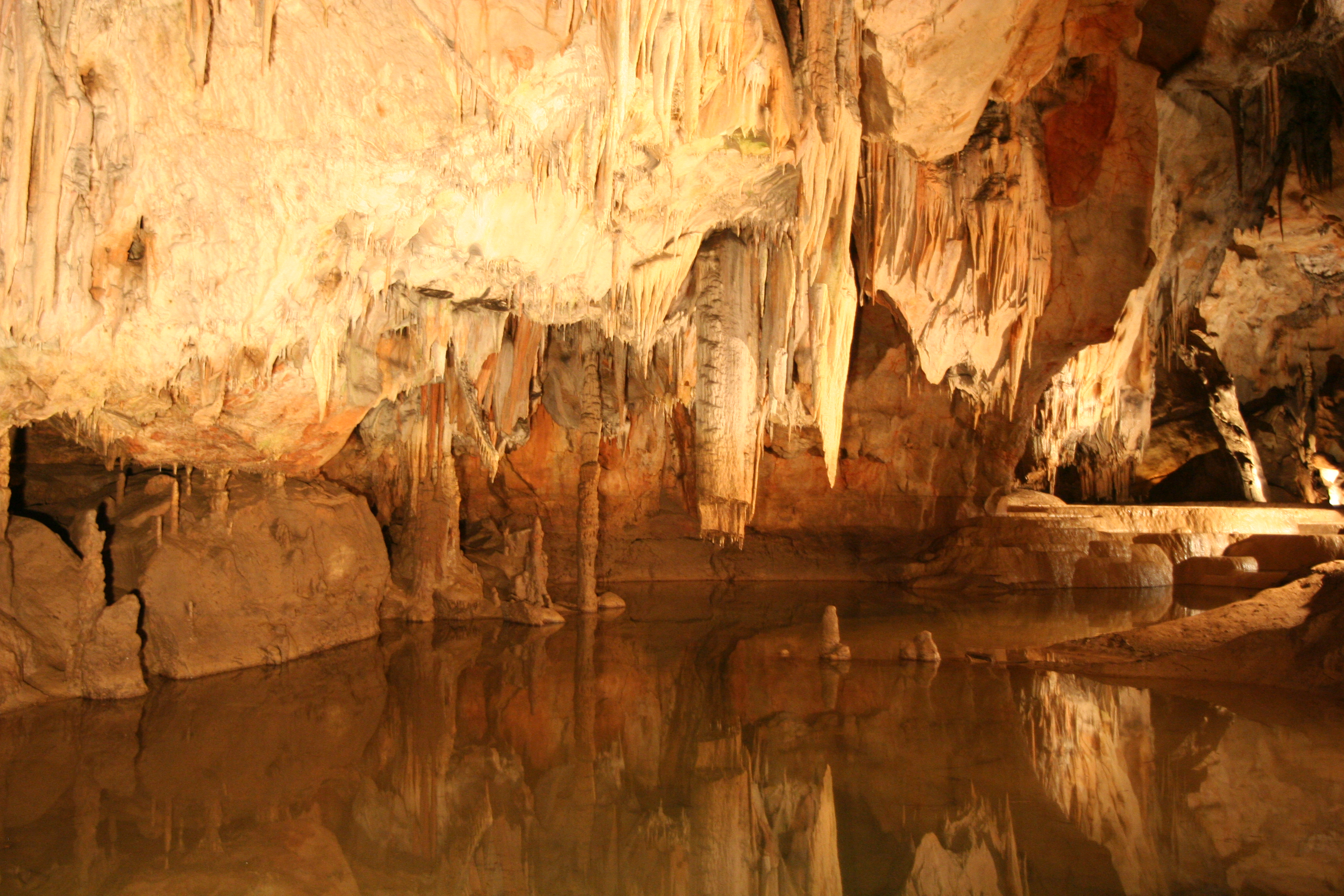
limestone cascades

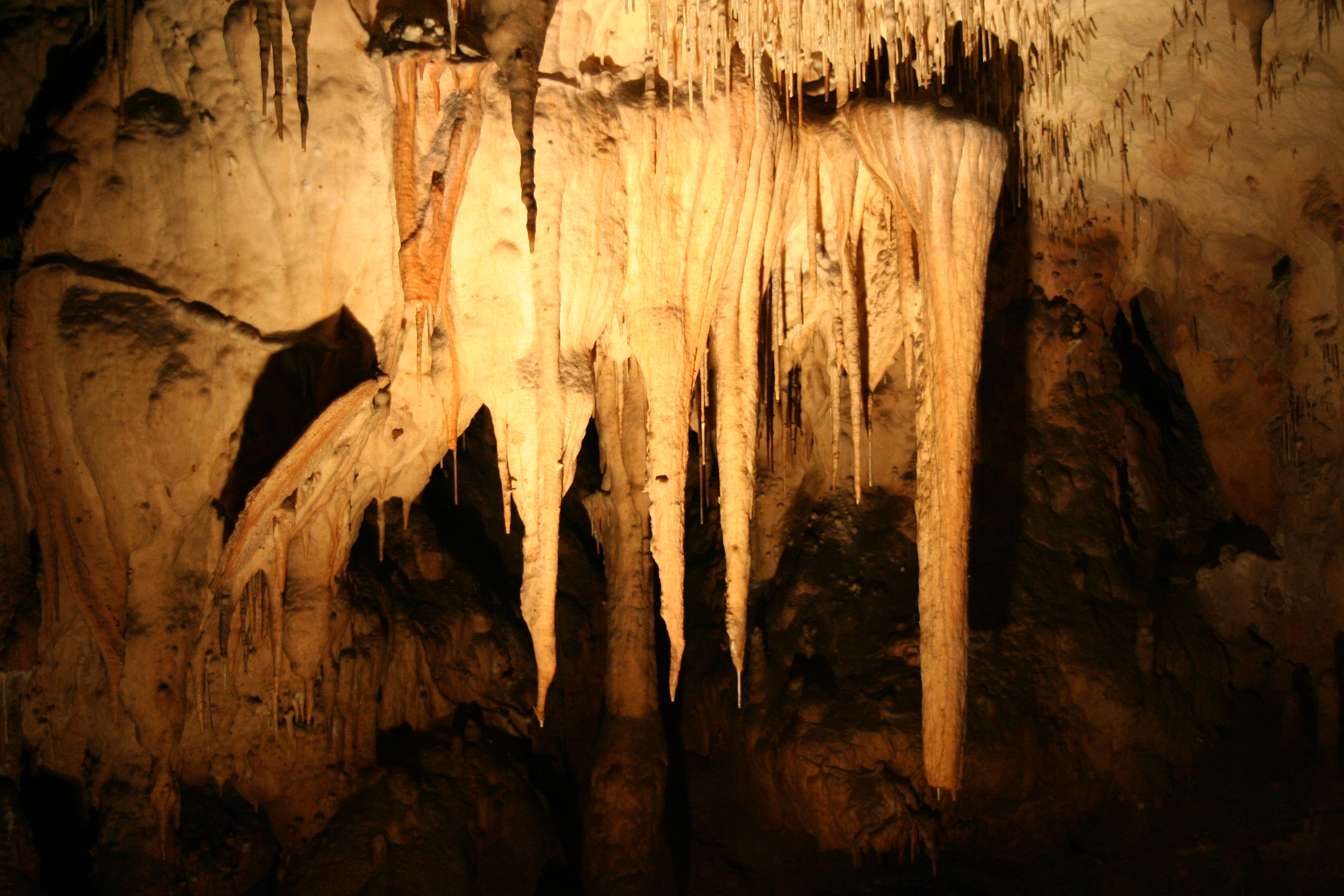
Stalactites

Boat

== Human occupation ==
Jaroslav Böhm directed excavations during the 1930s. Human presence has been documented dating back to the Paleolithic. The cave had presumably been a casual refuge for the oldest Neolithic inhabitants of Eastern Slovakia. However, the cave has been frequented by Neolithic humans of the Bükk culture, who might even have manufactured their distinct thin-walled pottery inside the cave. The original entrance of the Domica Cave was blocked by debris after Paleo-humans had abandoned it and the cave became inaccessible.

Post holes from dwelling objects and fireplaces were discovered in several places of the cave. More than 200 reconstructed containers from sherds as well as a terrace-dug slope in a fine-grained loam on the Styx bank with imprints of stone axes are evidences of ceramics manufacture in the cave. Irons, awls, arrows, the oldest comb in Europe, ring, decorated cylinder bracelet and fishhook represent the peak of Neolithic processing of bones. Also pendants from shells and animal teeth were preserved.

== See also ==
- Krásnohorská Cave
- Škocjan Caves in Slovenia
