= Aggtelek National Park =

National park of Hungary

- IUCN category II (national park)
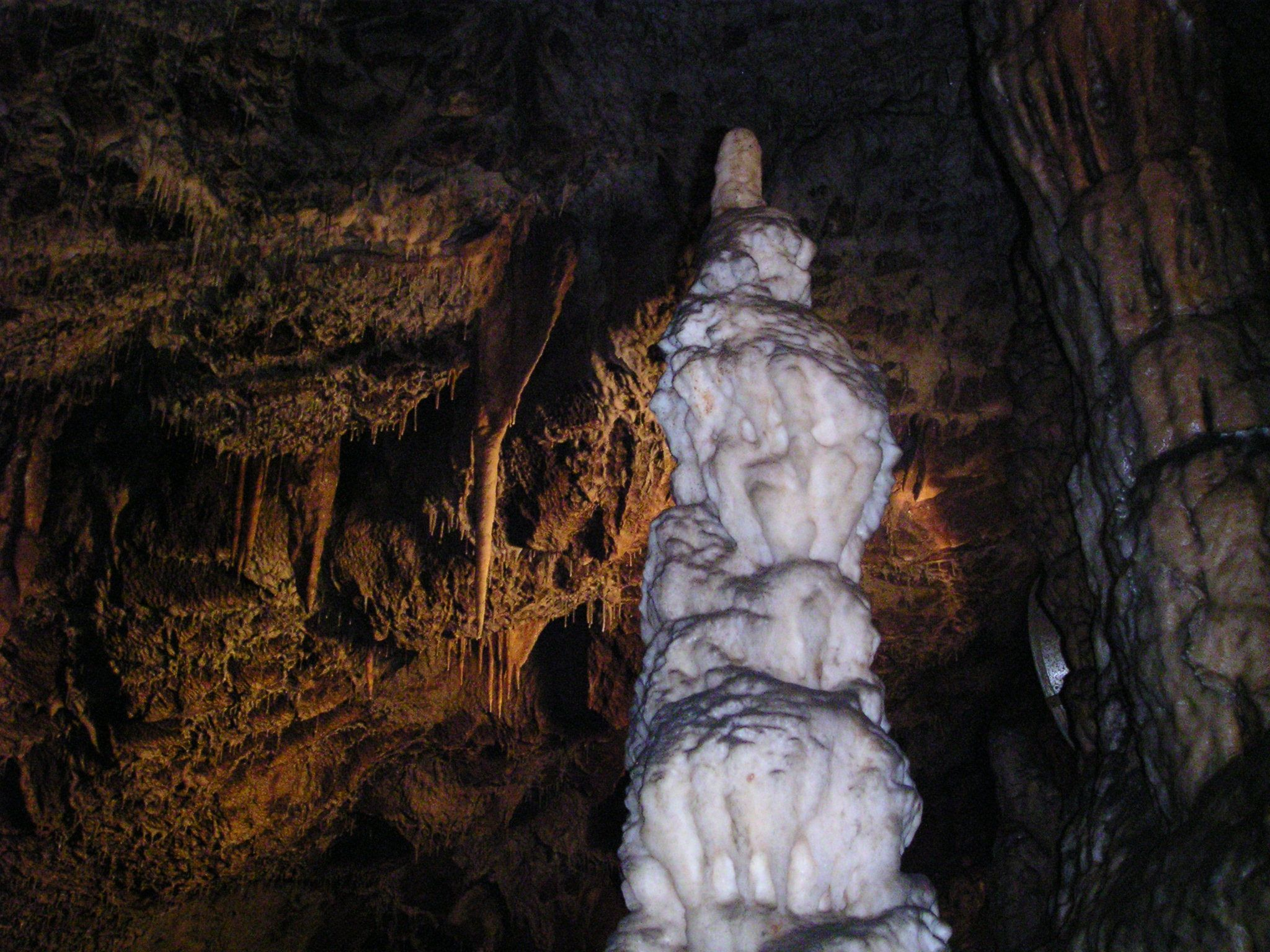
- Stalagmite in the Baradla cave
- Interactive map of Aggtelek National Park
- Location: Hungary
- Coordinates: 48°28′32.628″N 20°29′12.732″E
- Area: 198.92 km^{2} (76.80 sq mi)
- Established: 1985

UNESCO World Heritage Site
- Type: Natural
- Criteria: viii
- Designated: 1995
- Reference no.: 725
- Region: Eastern Europe

Aggtelek National Park (Hungarian: Aggteleki Nemzeti Park) is a national park in Northern Hungary, in the Aggtelek Karst region. The most significant values of the national park are the special surface formations and caves in this limestone landscape.

== Description ==
The park consists of 280 caves with different sizes. It covers a total area of 198.92 km^{2} of which 39.22 km^{2} are under increased protection. The largest stalactite cave of Europe is situated in this area: the Baradla cave (26 km long, of which 8 km is in Slovakia, known under the name of Domica). Several of the caves have different specialities. For example, the Peace Cave has a sanatorium which help treating people suffering from asthma.

== History ==
The first written documentation of the caves can be dated back to 1549. Since 1920 it has been used as a tourist attraction. The Aggtelek National Park itself was founded in 1985. It has been part of the UNESCO World Heritage since 1995 along with the Slovak Karst caves.

== Fauna ==
Animals present in the Aggtelek National Park included the fire salamander, hucul pony, common buzzard, eastern imperial eagle, European copper skink, white-throated dipper, red deer, Eurasian lynx, gray wolf, wild boar, crested tit, goldcrest, Eurasian bullfinch, hazel grouse, common kingfisher, red-backed shrike, old World swallowtail, scarce swallowtail and the saga pedo.

== Gallery ==
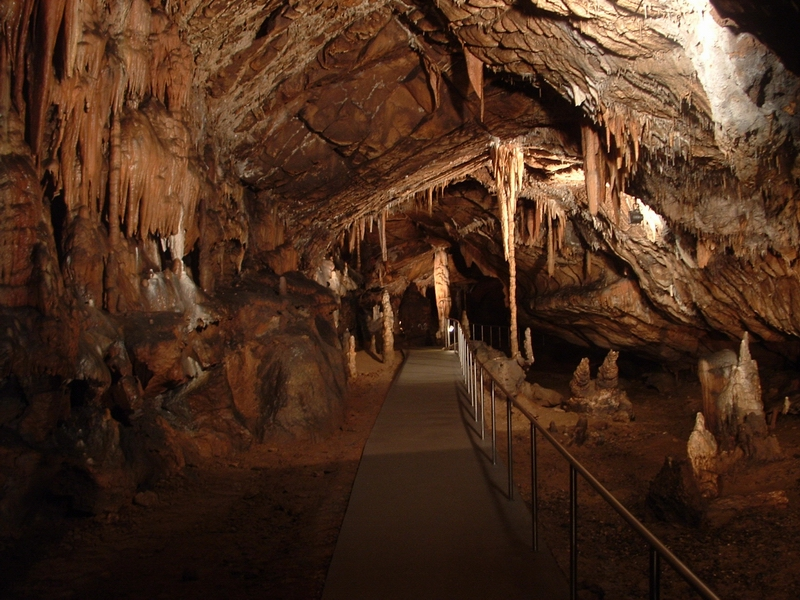
Baradla Cave in Aggtelek

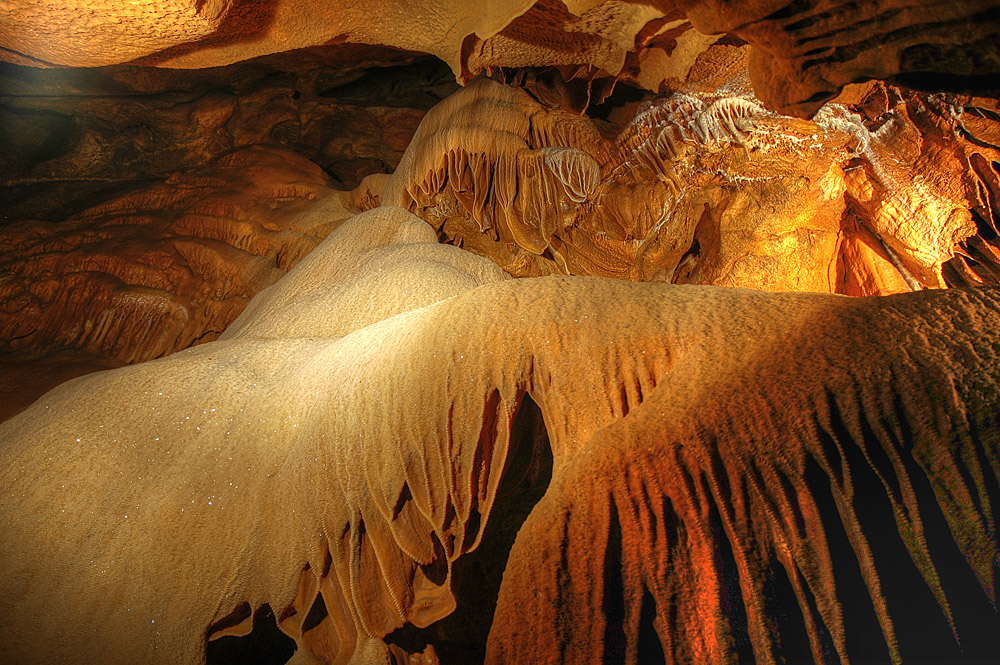
Vass Imre Cave in Jósvafő

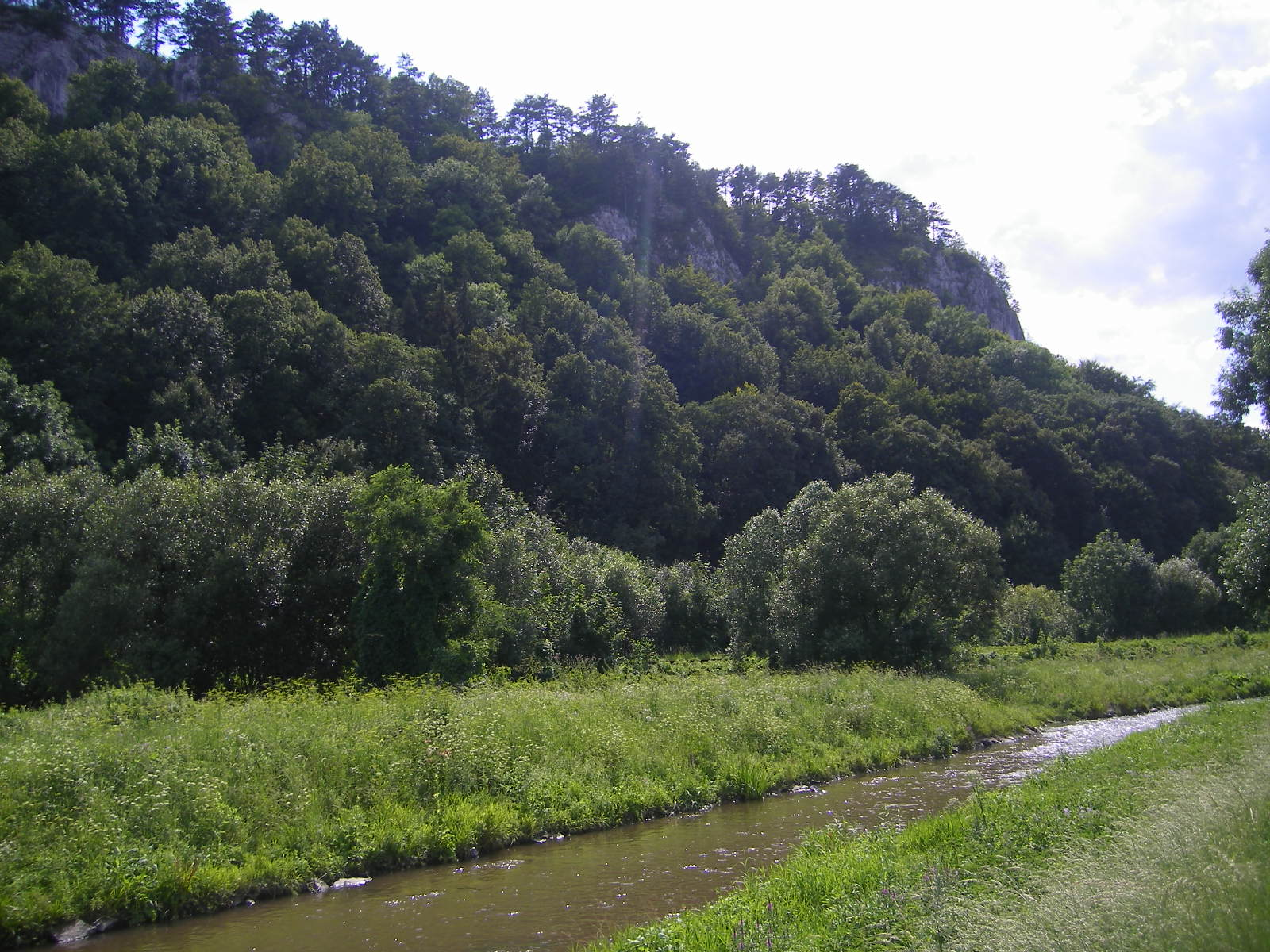
The Bódva river

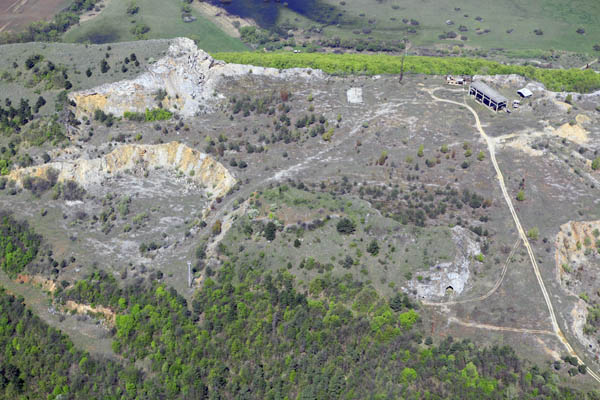
Aerial photo of Esztramos-hegy

== See also ==
- Caves of Aggtelek Karst and Slovak Karst UNESCO World Heritage Site
- List of national parks of Hungary
