= Aggtelek Karst =

Coordinates: 48.5°N 20.5°E

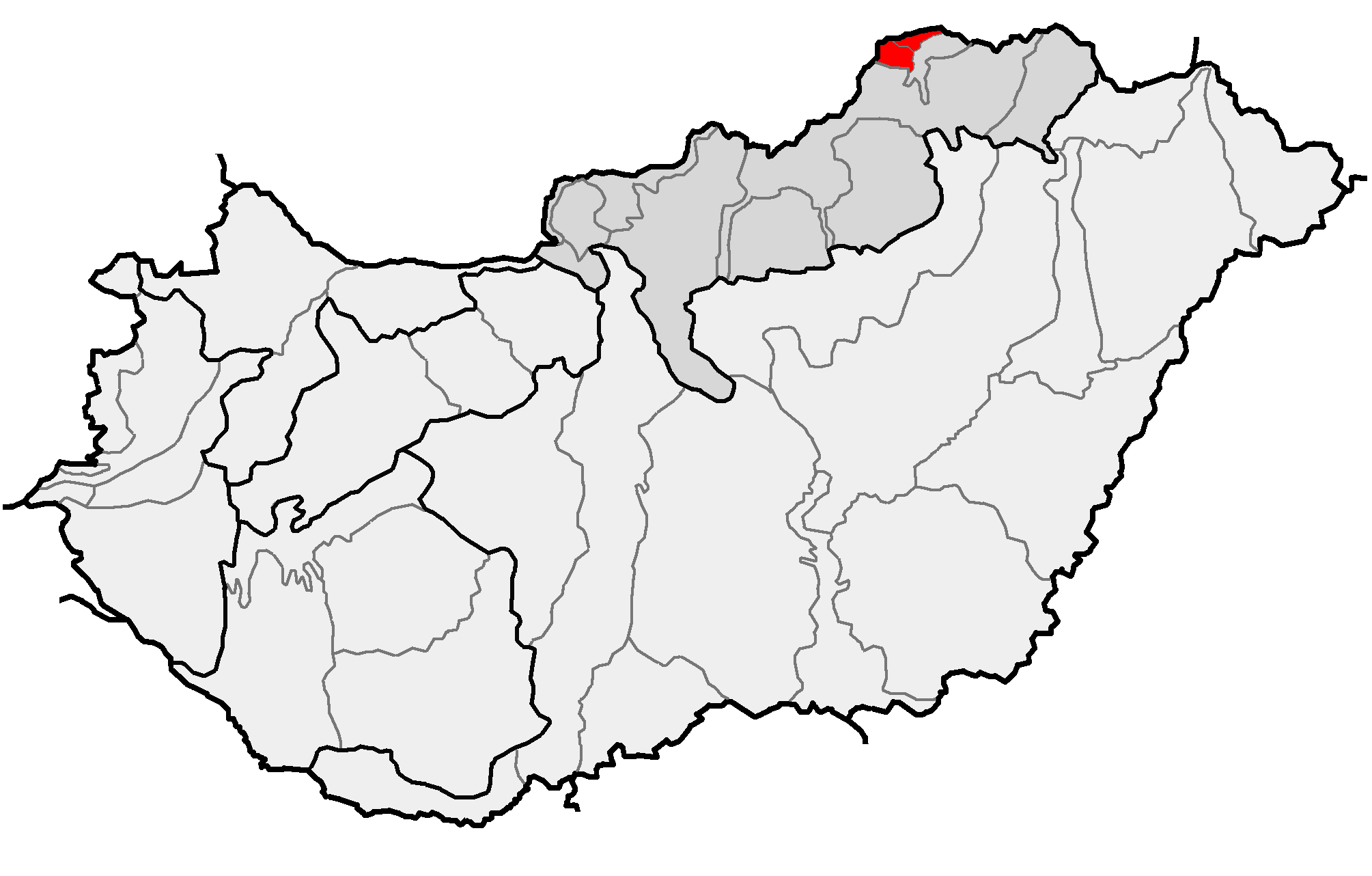
Location of Aggtelek Karst (in red) within physical subdivisions of Hungary

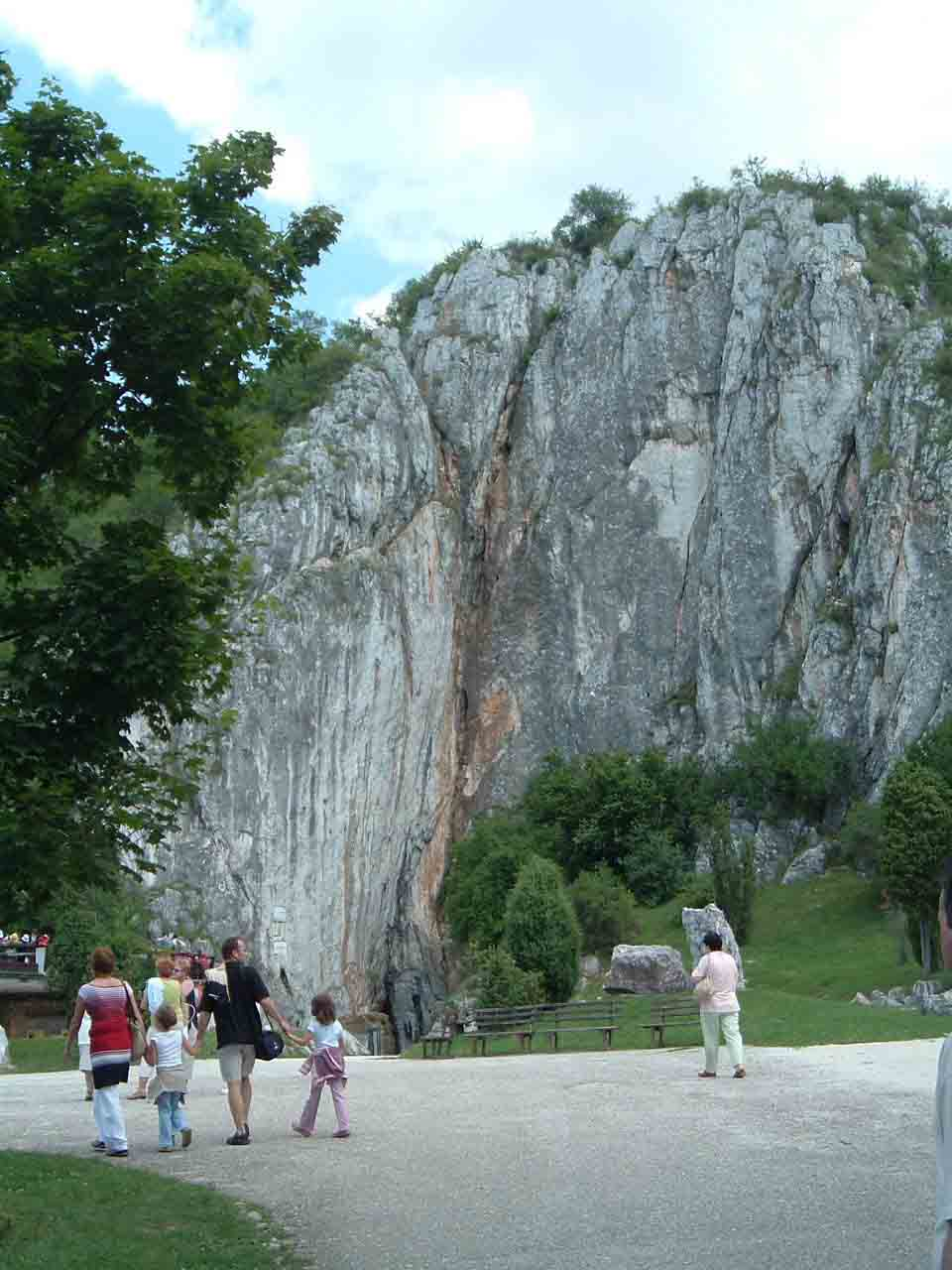
Limestone cliffs at the entrance to the cave Aggtelek

Aggtelek Karst is a karst area in northern Hungary.

The area is especially well known for its abundance of caves, which were recorded together with those in neighboring Slovakia in 1995 to the list of World Heritage Site under the name of the Caves of Aggtelek Karst and Slovak Karst.

The Aggtelek National Park (Hungarian: Aggteleki Nemzeti Park) is a national park in Northern Hungary, founded in 1985. It contains 198.92 km² (of which 39.22 km² are under increased protection). It has been part of the UNESCO World Heritage since 1995. The largest stalactite cave of Europe is situated in this area: the Baradla Cave (26 km long, of which 8 km is in Slovakia, known under the name of Domica).
