= Körös-Maros National Park =

National park of Hungary

Coordinates: 46°34′23″N 21°07′02″E

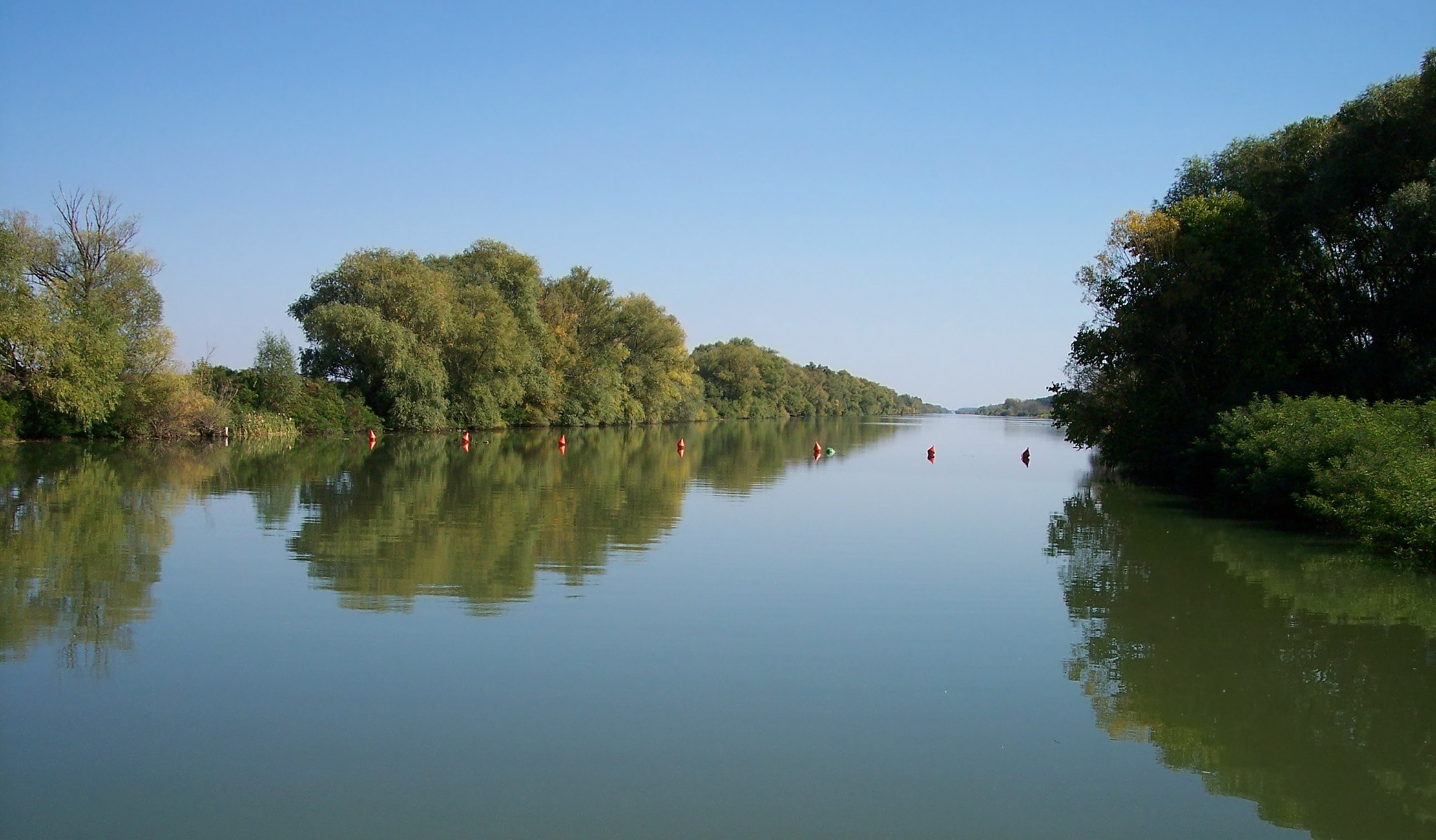
Kettős-Körös River

Körös-Maros National Park is one of the 10 national parks in Hungary (area 501.34 km^{2}), located in Békés county, in the Southern Great Plain. The park was created in 1997 for the protection of birds.

Körös-Maros National Park has a number of regions such as Kis-Sárrét swamp, Fáspuszta, Mágor-puszta or Kardoskúti Fehértó. It features a bustard reserve established in 1975. The major towns of the area are Szarvas and Dévaványa.

The great flocks of birds that can be seen during the autumn migration season at Lake Fehér near Kardoskút. The lake is used as a resting place and nesting site by tens of thousands of plovers, cranes and wild ducks. The reserve at Dévaványa is a refuge for the great bustard, the ostrich of the Hungarian puszta.
