= Őrség National Park =

National park of Hungary

Coordinates: 46°52′N 16°25′E

- Hungarian: Őrségi Nemzeti Park
- IUCN category II (national park)
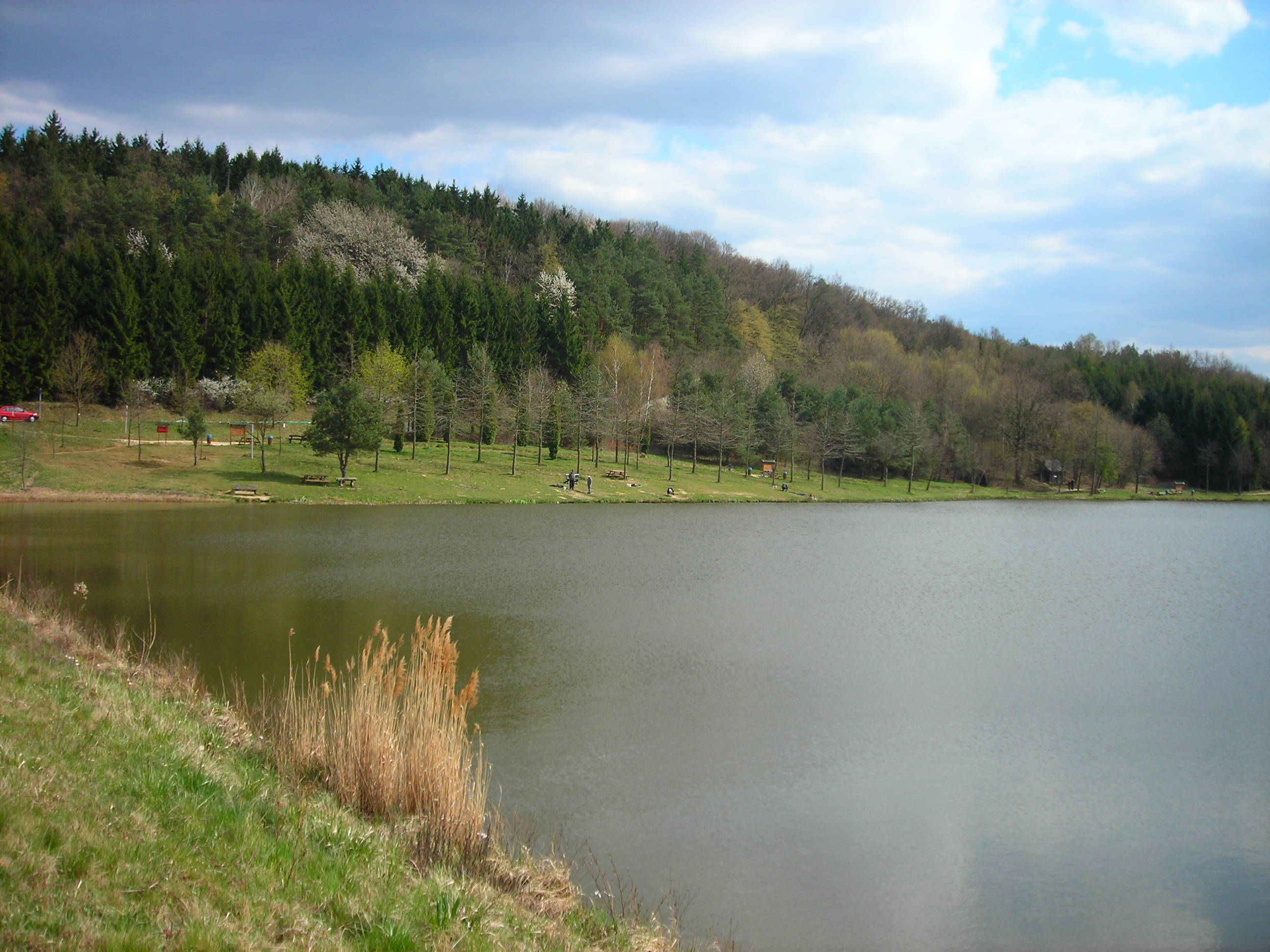
- Area: 440 km^{2} (170 sq mi)
- Established: 2002
- Website: Official website

Őrség National Park (Hungarian: Őrségi Nemzeti Park) is a Hungarian National Park established in 2002 with a total area of 440 km^{2} (110,000 acres; 170 sq mi).

The region takes its name Őrség (meaning 'watch post') from the Magyars, who in order to defend the western gates, built watch posts across this land. Over the centuries, the landscape has been shaped by farming on small sections keeping harmony in relations with nature and maintaining diversity.
