= Baradla Cave =

Cave system in Hungary and Slovakia

UNESCO World Heritage Site
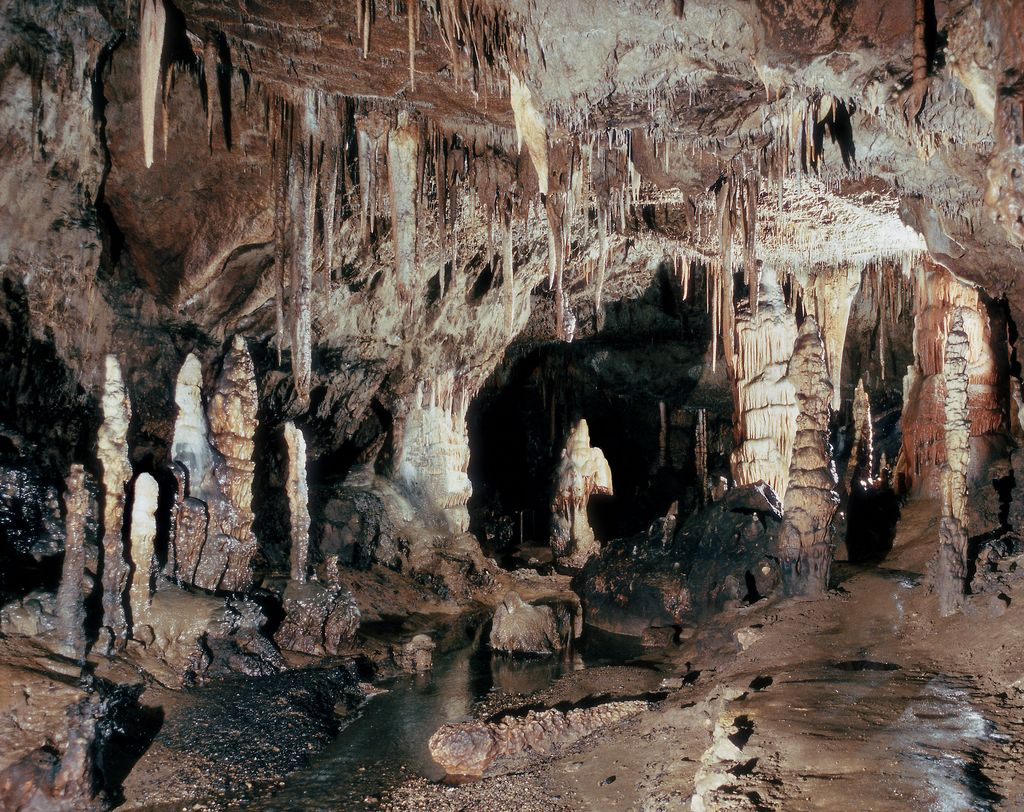

- Location within Hungary Location within Slovakia
- Location: Hungary and Slovakia
- Part of: Caves of Aggtelek Karst and Slovak Karst
- Criteria: Natural: (viii)
- Reference: 725ter
- Inscription: 1995 (19th Session)
- Extensions: 2000, 2008
- Coordinates: 48°28′N 20°30′E

The Baradla Domica cave system is a large cave system in northern Hungary. As part of the Aggtelek Karst, it extends more than 25.5 km (25,500 m) and includes the 5.3 km (3.3 mi) Domica Cave. Much of the cave is decorated with stalactites of varied colors and shapes.

The cave system has been visited and researched for centuries because of its famous ornate speleothems. Natural entrances to the cave have been open from ancient times, and there are traces of Neolithic occupation. However, the first written mention of the cave dates from 1549. The first survey was conducted in 1794 by Joseph Sartory. In 1825 it was only known to be 1.8 km (1.1 mi) in length. This section was surveyed in 1802 and the first map published. In 1825 the engineer, Imre Vass explored the cave a further 5 km (3.1 mi) along the main branch, producing an accurate map and a description. His work, published in Hungarian and German was published in 1831. In order to facilitate cave visits, the first tourist walks were installed in 1806. In 1890 the Red Lake entrances were established and further exploration and extension was conducted between 1927 and 1928.

== Description ==
The cave has a natural entrance at Aggtelek, at the foot of a high white cliff that overlooks the edge of the village. It has an articulated, meandering main channel 7 km (4.3 mi) long, with a rock tunnel, on average, 10 m (33 ft) wide and 7 to 8 m (23 to 26 ft) high with a few giant caverns (one of which is large enough to hold 1000 people at once. The main branch has several short and long connecting side branches. Subterranean river waters run through the main branch at times of flood. The world's largest known stalagmite, at 37.2 m (122 ft) tall, is found within the Baradla-Domica cave system.

Over 500 species of troglodytes (cave-dwelling animals), including 21 species of bats are found within the cave system.

== Tourism and conservation ==
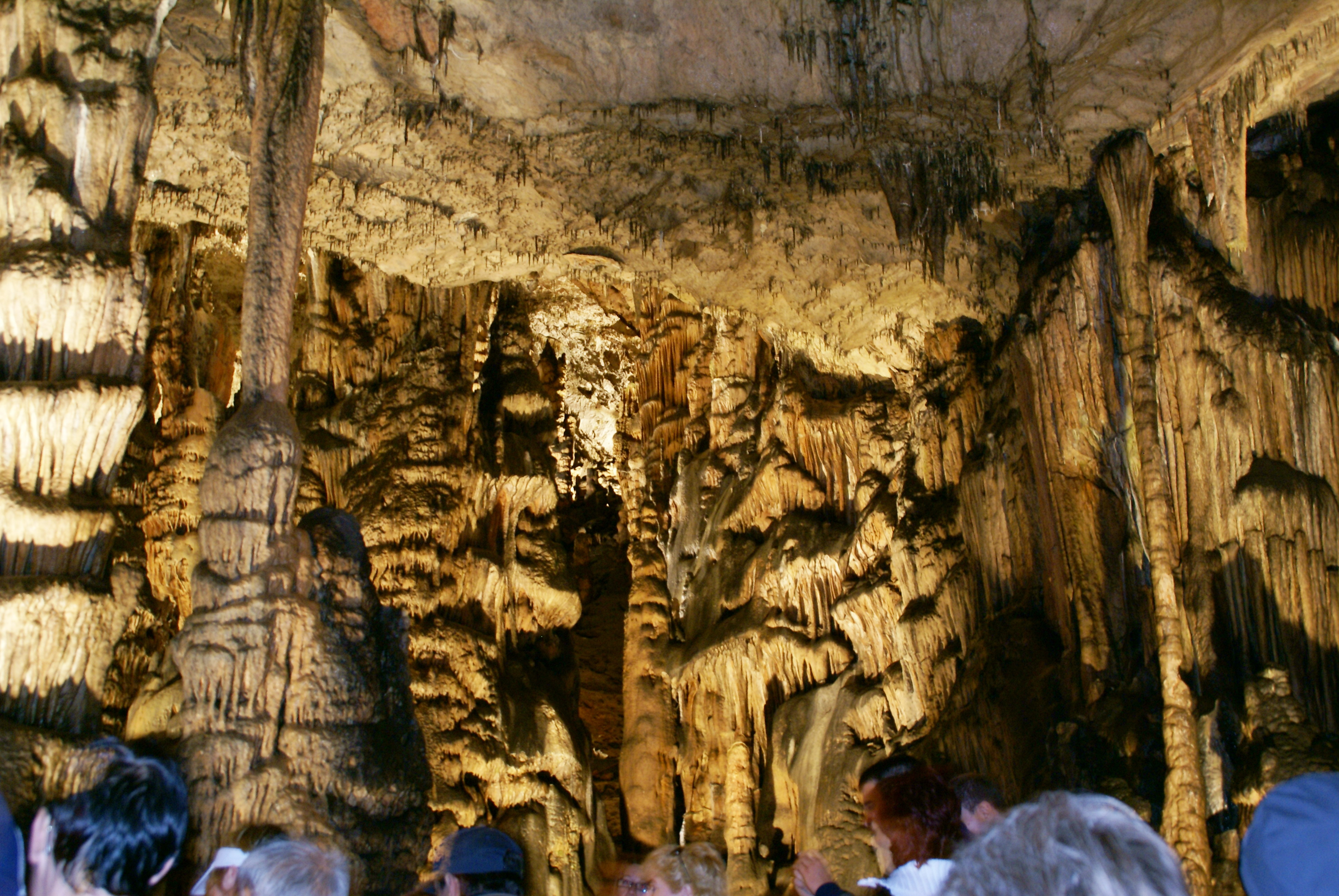
Baradla Cave

Because of its spectacular cave structures and rare testimony to both tropical and temperate effects on karst landscapes, Baradla and other caves of the Aggtelek Karst and Slovak Karst were declared as a UNESCO World Heritage Site in 1995. The entire cave system and the catchment areas - with the nearby Domicával wetlands of international importance were subject to protection in 2001. The Aggtelek National Park is an appealing attraction all year round, popular with visitors, who can choose from several hiking trails.

== See also ==
- List of caves
