= Csopak =

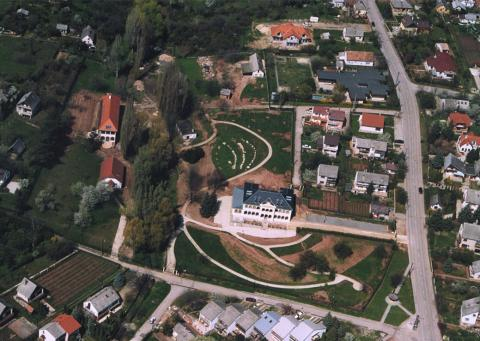
- Aerial view of Csopak

- Flag Coat of arms

- Location of Csopak
- Coordinates: 46.97829°N 17.91877°E
- Country: Hungary
- County: Veszprém

Area
  - Total: 23.98 km^{2} (9.26 sq mi)

Population (2017)
  - Total: 1,752
  - Density: 73.06/km^{2} (189.2/sq mi)
- Time zone: UTC+1 (CET)
  - Summer (DST): UTC+2 (CEST)
- Postal code: 8229
- Area code: 87
- Website: https://csopak.hu/

Csopak is a village in Veszprém county, Hungary at Lake Balaton. There is a beach in the village.

== Economy ==
Csopak is famous for its wine, usually and traditionally made of olaszrizling: since July 2020, Csopak or Csopaki wine has become a European protected designation of origin (PDO). For folklore and tourism purposes, the wine days are celebrated each year in August.

== Twin towns – sister cities ==
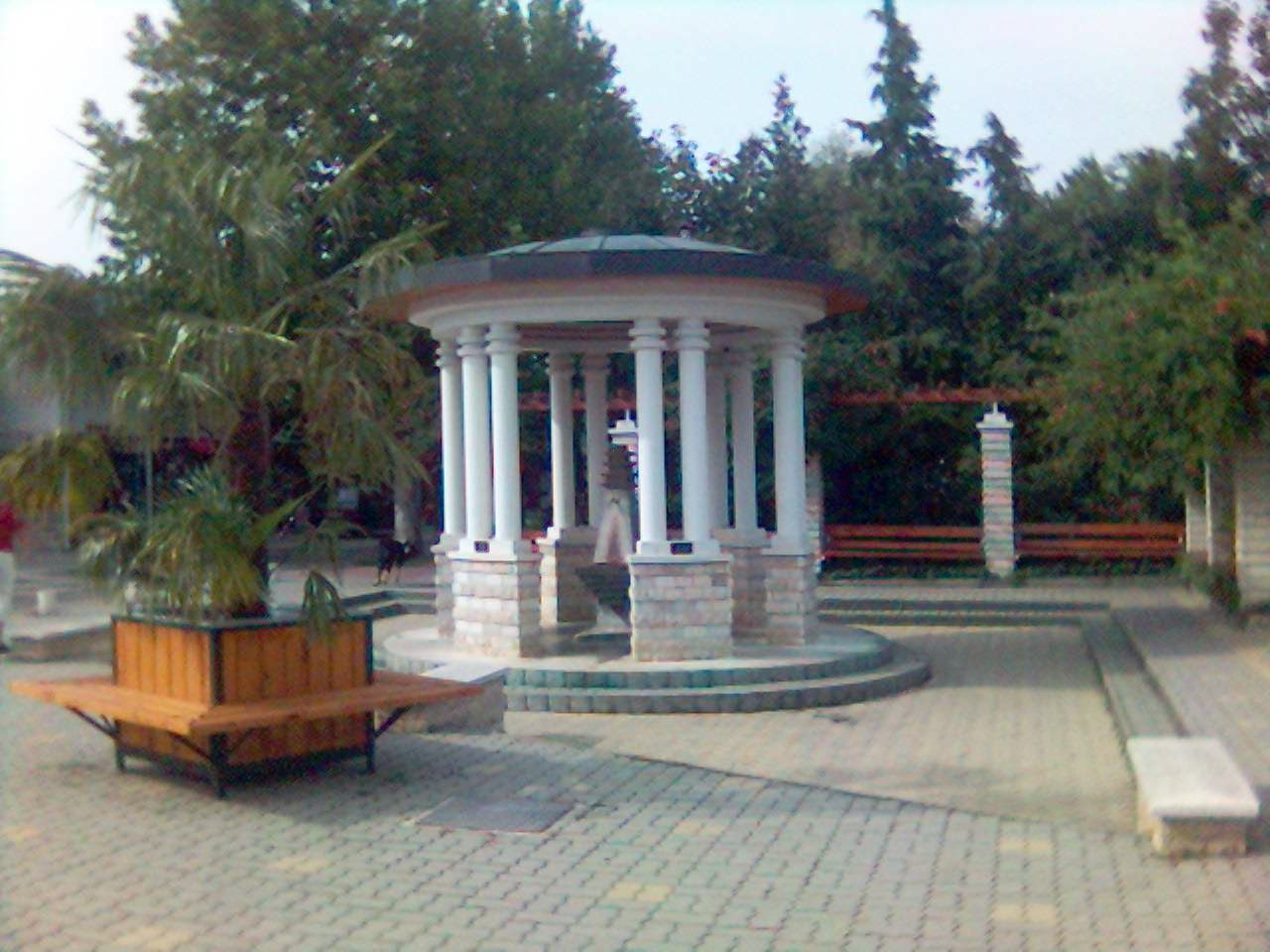

Csopak is twinned with:

- Kavarna, Bulgaria
- Myślenice, Poland
- Ortovero, Italy
- Sovata, Romania
