= Bükk culture =

Archaeological culture in Europe

Light green - Bükk Culture (Eastern Linear Pottery culture)

Bükk culture (Hungarian: Bükki kultúra, Slovak: Bukovohorská kultúra, Ukrainian: Буковогірська культура) may have belonged to a dense pocket of Cro-Magnon type people inhabiting the Bükk mountains of Hungary (inner western Carpathians) and the upper Tisza and its tributaries. The surrounding Neolithic was mainly of a more gracile Mediterranean type, with a Cro-Magnon admixture as another possibility. As to whether the Cro-Magnons were a remnant squeezed into this pocket, there is no sign of conflict there and the Cro-Magnons were doing rather well in the obsidian trade. They were, so to speak, the wealthy men of the European Neolithic.

The Cro-Magnons did acquire the Neolithic from the Starčevo culture to the south. In the Szatmár culture prior to 5500 BC, the Cro-Magnons modified their Mesolithic ways and took on Starcevan artifact types and pottery styles, and the same can be said of the succeeding Tiszadob culture of roughly 5200–5000. By 5000 the LBK had replaced the Starcevo in the surrounding region and it influenced the Cro-Magnons in the Bükk culture.

Bükk pottery is the finest ware of the LBK. It has a larger variety of forms: tall stands, jars with feet, globular bowls, and so on. Their fabric is tempered with sand, as opposed to the chaff of the western LBK. The walls of the pots are thin and delicate. Decoration consists of LBK patterns composed of bands that are both painted and engraved with fine lines. Colors are white, red and yellow, just the ones to brighten and make warm a successful household. The patterns are more complex, more regular and evidence more care in their execution. Some of the patterns are probably symbols. The Cro-Magnons also owned abstract human figurines, in which geometric forms represent people. These are covered with symbols.

The source of Bükk culture wealth is the fine obsidian of which the mountains are an abundant source. The Cro-Magnons probably encouraged each other to settle there and take up the ethnic trade. Workshops for the manufacture of obsidian tools are common. They are identified by the hundreds of tools littering the floor of the site, which must have been a shed. These workshops were near homes. They probably represent a family business. In some cases jars of knives stand ready for export. The knives are sorted by size. An abundance of spondylus shells in the graves suggests that this collectible was used for currency. Their ultimate source was the Mediterranean. These Cro-Magnons, as opposed to the Mesolithics of the Atlantic coast, are probably best regarded as men of the world, dominating the market for stone tools from their mountain retreats.

The Bükk people lived a very different life from the residents of the long houses. Bükk homes are individual and rectangular, a few meters wide and about twice as long. Many are dug into the earth as wholly or partly subterranean. Others are wholly above ground, wattle and daub construction. The Bükk people sited their homes on hills, slopes, or in ravines. They used caves for sacred purposes, but may have lived there as well.

When not engaged in manufacture and trade, the Bükk people shared the same garden economy as the western variant. To the light game of the open forests they added the fierce aurochs. When death came they buried the deceased in the village, sometimes under the house. Such a custom implies a belief in spiritual continuity and lends to the family a dimension in time as well as space. In the village resided simultaneously both the living family and the spirits of their deceased.

== Genetics ==
In a 2017 genetic study published in Nature, the remains of five individuals ascribed to the Bükk culture was analyzed. Of the three samples of Y-DNA extracted, one belonged to I2a2a1b1, one belonged to I2a2a, and one belonged to H. mtDNA extracted were various subclades of U, H, J and HV.

== See also ==
- Old Europe (archaeology)

== Sources ==
- Lipson, Mark (November 16, 2017). "Parallel palaeogenomic transects reveal complex genetic history of early European farmers". Nature. 551 (7680). Nature Research: 368–372. Bibcode:2017Natur.551..368L. doi:10.1038/nature24476. PMC 5973800. PMID 29144465.
- Narasimhan, Vagheesh M. (September 6, 2019). "The formation of human populations in South and Central Asia". Science. 365 (6457) eaat7487. American Association for the Advancement of Science. bioRxiv 10.1101/292581. doi:10.1126/science.aat7487. PMC 6822619. PMID 31488661.
