= List of World Heritage Sites in Slovakia =

Locations of World Heritage Sites in Slovakia. Blue dots mark the Wooden Churches of the Slovak part of the Carpathian Mountain Area. Grey dots mark the sites of the Slovak Karst.

The United Nations Educational, Scientific and Cultural Organization (UNESCO) World Heritage Sites are places of importance to cultural or natural heritage as described in the UNESCO World Heritage Convention, established in 1972. Cultural heritage consists of monuments (such as architectural works, monumental sculptures, or inscriptions), groups of buildings, and sites (including archaeological sites). Natural heritage consists of natural features (physical and biological formations), geological and physiographical formations (including habitats of threatened species of animals and plants), and natural sites which are important from the point of view of science, conservation, or natural beauty. The Slovak Republic ratified the convention on 31 March 1993, making its historical sites eligible for inclusion on the list.

As of 2021, there are eight World Heritage Sites in Slovakia. The first three sites in Slovakia were added to the list in 1993. These sites were Vlkolínec, Historic Town of Banská Štiavnica and the Technical Monuments in its Vicinity, and Spišský Hrad. The latter site was extended in 2009 to include Levoča and the associated cultural monuments. The most recent site added to the list was the Danube Limes, in 2021. Six sites in Slovakia are cultural and two are natural. Three sites are transnational, the Caves of Aggtelek Karst and Slovak Karst are shared with Hungary, the Danube Limes is shared with Germany and Austria, and the Ancient and Primeval Beech Forests of the Carpathians and Other Regions of Europe are shared with 17 other countries. In addition, Slovakia has 12 sites on the tentative list.

== World Heritage Sites ==
UNESCO lists sites under ten criteria; each entry must meet at least one of the criteria. Criteria i through vi are cultural, and vii through x are natural.

* Transnational site

World Heritage Sites
Site	Image	Location	Year listed	UNESCO data	Description
Historic Town of Banská Štiavnica and the Technical Monuments in its Vicinity	Town square with the monument dedicated to Holy Trinity	Banská Bystrica Region	1993	618rev; iv, v (cultural)	Banská Štiavnica is the oldest mining town in Slovakia. While mining activities in the area already took place in the Bronze Age, the town itself was founded in the 13th century. The rich deposits of polymetallic ores, containing also gold and silver, brought wealth to the town, resulting in construction of several representative buildings, such as palaces, churches, and castles. In 1762, the first Mining and Forestry Academy in Europe was founded here. The mining activities declined in the 19th century due to the depletion of the ore deposits.
Levoča, Spišský Hrad and the Associated Cultural Monuments	Castle ruins on the top of the hill	Prešov and Košice Regions	1993	620bis: iv (cultural)	The Spiš Castle is one of the largest castles in the region and includes well-preserved buildings from the 13th and 14th centuries, in Romanesque and Gothic styles. In 2009, the site was expanded to include the town of Levoča, with its 14th century Basilica of St. James, home to the Late Gothic altar by Master Paul, as well as the associated sites in Spišské Podhradie, Spišská Kapitula, and Žehra, that also feature urban ensembles from the same period.
Vlkolínec	Village street with wooden houses on both sides	Žilina Region	1993	622rev; iv, v (cultural)	Vlkolínec represents a traditional European rural settlement in a mountainous area, and is the best preserved ensemble of that type in the region. The village comprises 43 traditional log houses which mostly date to the 19th century, a church with a bell tower, and a school.
Caves of Aggtelek Karst and Slovak Karst*		Košice Region	1995	725ter; viii (natural)	The site comprises 712 caves in Slovakia and Hungary. They represent a typical temperate-zone karstic system. The sediments and fossils in the caves show geological records of the subtropical and tropical climatic conditions from the Late Cretaceous and early Tertiary, as well as the Pleistocene glaciations. The original nomination listed the Domica, Gombasecká, Jasovská, Krásnohorská, and Ochtinská caves on the Slovak side, with Dobšiná Ice Cave added as an extension in 2000. A modification of the site boundaries on the Hungarian side took place in 2008.
Bardejov Town Conservation Reserve	Look at the town square from above	Prešov Region	2000	973; iii, iv (cultural)	The town of Bardejov is located close to an important trade route to Poland across the Carpathians. The city plan dates to the 13th and 14th century and included fortifications that were advanced for contemporary standards. Burghers' houses from the 15th century and the Gothic Basilica of St Giles surround the main square. Bardejov also includes a small Jewish quarter from the 18th century.
Ancient and Primeval Beech Forests of the Carpathians and Other Regions of Europe*	Forest scenery, trees and a small stream	Prešov Region	2007	1133quater; ix (natural)	This site comprises undisturbed examples of temperate forests that demonstrate the postglacial expansion process of European beech from a few isolated refuge areas in the Alps, Carpathians, Dinarides, Mediterranean, and Pyrenees. The site was originally listed in 2007 as the Primeval Beech Forests of the Carpathians, shared by Slovakia and Ukraine, extended in 2011 to include the Ancient Beech Forests of Germany, and further extended in 2017 and 2021 to include forests in a total of 18 countries. Four reserves in Slovakia are listed, Stužica – Bukovské vrchy, Rožok, Vihorlat, and Havešová. The modification of the boundaries of forests in Slovakia took place in 2021.
Wooden Churches of the Slovak part of the Carpathian Mountain Area	Large wooden church in Hronsek	Košice, Banská Bystrica, Žilina and Prešov Regions	2008	1273; iii, iv (cultural)	This site comprises eight wooden churches that were built in the Carpathian area of Slovakia between the 16th and the 18th centuries, as representative examples of wooden religious architecture at the area where communities of three different faiths coexist. Two churches are Roman Catholic, three are Protestant, and three are Greek Orthodox. The Wooden articular church of Hronsek is pictured.
Frontiers of the Roman Empire – The Danube Limes (Western Segment)*	Roman ruins	Bratislava and Nitra Regions	2021	1608rev; ii, iii, iv (cultural)	The Danubian Limes, a network of fortifications along the Danube river, protected the borders of the Roman Empire. The site is shared with Germany and Austria. Six sites at two locations, of military camps Celemantia and Gerulata (ruins pictured), are listed in Slovakia.

== Tentative list ==
In addition to sites inscribed on the World Heritage list, member states can maintain a list of tentative sites that they may consider for nomination. Nominations for the World Heritage list are only accepted if the site was previously listed on the tentative list. As of 2021, Slovakia recorded 12 sites on its tentative list.

Tentative World Heritage Sites
Site	Image	Location	Year listed	UNESCO criteria	Description
Gemer and Abov churches with the medieval wall paintings	Interior of an old church with frescos	Banská Bystrica and Košice Regions	1995	iv (cultural)	This nomination comprises ten churches in southern Slovakia. They feature well-preserved murals from the 14th and 15th centuries, painted by vagrant Italian painters of the Giotto school. The Lutheran church of Štítnik is pictured.
Tokaj Wine Region*	Vineyards, hills in the background	Košice Region	2002	ii, iii, v (cultural)	Tokaj Wine Region is a cultural landscape where wine has been produced since the prehistoric times. It borders the region of the same name in Hungary, that has been listed as a World Heritage Site since 2002, as Tokaj Wine Region Historic Cultural Landscape.
Original Meadow – Pasture Sites of Slovakia		62 locations	2002	v (cultural)	This nomination comprises 62 sites across Slovakia that preserve traditional forms of farming, a high landscape diversity, traditional wooden and other original dwellings, and demonstrate significant social and ecological value of the territory.
The Memorial of Chatam Sófer	A concrete memorial with a path leading to it	Bratislava Region	2002	iv, v, vi (cultural)	The Memorial of Chatam Sófer is the burial place of Moses Sofer, a prominent orthodox rabbi from the 19th century, built at the place of a 17th-century Jewish cemetery. The historical cemetery was mostly destroyed with the construction of the road tunnel under Bratislava Castle in 1943 but the graves of important rabbis were preserved.
System of Fortifications at the Confluence of the Rivers Danube and Váh in Komárno – Komárom*	Fortifications, look from above	Nitra Region	2002	i, ii, iv, v (cultural)	The cities of Komárno in Slovakia and Komárom in Hungary are located at the confluence of Danube and Váh rivers. Due to the strategic location, a fortification system has been developed around the area over the centuries. The Slovak part of the site comprises the central fortress, the Palatine line fortifications and the Váh line fortifications.
The concept of the lenticular historical town core of Košice City	Main street in Košice, with a monument and buildings around	Košice Region	2002	ii, iv, v (cultural)	The town of Košice was situated on an important trade route intersection, connecting the East Europe with the West Europe and the Baltic with the Black Sea. The market settlement was founded in the 13th century and grew in prominence in the 14th century. The medieval street plan is preserved, with the middle road gradually widening into the shape of a lens (thus, "lenticular"). A church is located in the widest part of the lens.
Natural Reserves of Tatras Mountain*	Lake Strbske Pleso with Tatra Mountains in the background	Žilina and Prešov Regions	2002	vii, viii, ix, x (natural)	The Tatras are the highest mountain range in the Carpathian Mountains and span the border between Slovakia and Poland. Though currently ice-free, they were covered by glaciers in the Pleistocene epoch. Several glacial landforms are visible, including moraines and glacial lakes. In Slovakia, the area is protected as the Tatra National Park.
Karst Valleys of Slovakia		several sites	2002	viii, ix, x (natural)	This nomination covers sites with karst topography in Slovakia. They are well-preserved, with little human impact, and rich in endemic flora and fauna.
Natural and Cultural Landscape of Danube Region		several sites	2002	(mixed)	This nomination covers sites along the Danube river. The natural component refers to the floodplains and wetland forests, which are important habitats for wildlife. From the cultural perspective, the area has been inhabited since the prehistoric times, with several cultures leaving archaeological remains and monuments.
Fungal Flora of Bukovské Hills	Beech and fir forest in Stuzica	Prešov Region	2002	x (natural)	Bukovské Hills are a flysch mountain range in north-eastern Slovakia. The forests, where the typical tree species are beech, fir, and maple, are rich in fungi and home to several rare species.
Herľany geyser	Geyser, located in the middle of a stonework, erupting	Košice Region	2002	vii (natural)	The geyser in Herľany was artificially activated in the 1870s during the drilling of a well for a nearby spa. The well reaches 400 metres (1,300 ft) underground and connects to an aquifer. The eruptions take place in 32 to 34 hour-intervals and last around 26 minutes.
Sites of Great Moravia: Slavonic Fortified Settlement at Mikulčice – Church of St. Margaret at Kopčany*	Old church built in stone with a modern red roof	Trnava Region	2007	iii, iv, v, vi (cultural)	Mikulčice was an important fortified settlement of the Slavonic state of Great Moravia in the Early Middle Ages. It was located in the area that now stretches across the borders of Slovakia and Czechia. The Church of St. Margaret dates to the 9th century and underwent renovations in the 13th and 16th centuries. The cemetery around the church is home to tombs from the 9th to the 18th centuries.
