= Hrušovská cave =

Cave in Slovakia

- Hrušovská jaskyňa
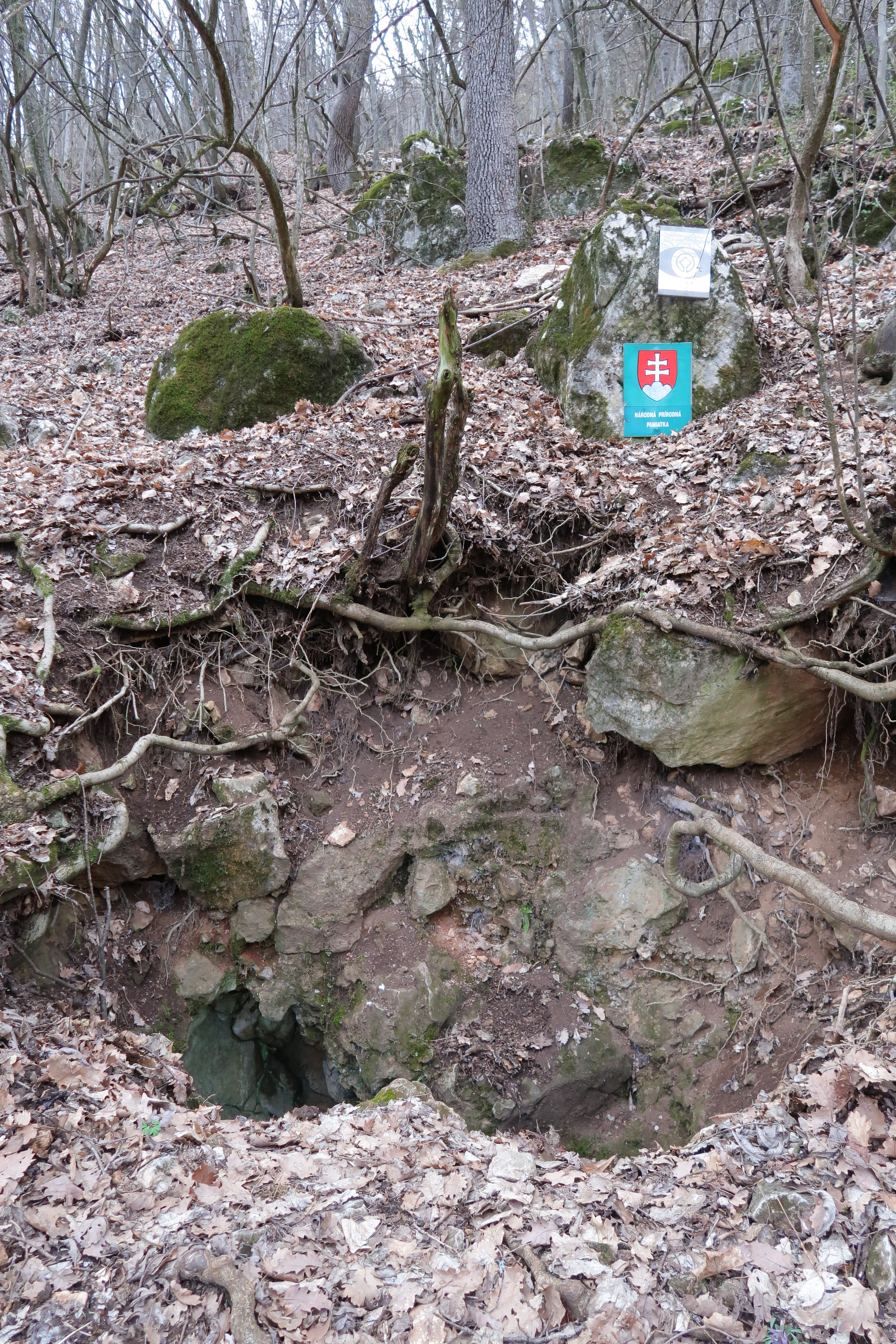
- The cave in 2025
- Interactive map of Hrušovská cave
- Coordinates: 48.599683°N 20.6422°E
- Discovery: 1978

Hrušovská Cave (Slovak: Hrušovská jaskyňa) is a Solutional cave protected as a national natural monument in the cadastral area of the village of Hrušov in the Rožňava District of the Košice Region. The subject of protection is a spring cave with sinter decoration, helictites, calcite crystals and outgrowths of sinter crystals.

It was discovered by excavation in the deluvial mantle of the slope of the plateau in 1978 at the site of a flood spring approximately 6 m above the level of the permanent karst spring Eveteš by the caver Róbert Boroš. Several hours later, he also walked through it for the first time and partially explored it together with Rožňava caver, Tomáš Lázár.

== History ==
=== Discovery ===
The cave was discovered on May 10, 1978, by Róbert Boroš, who excavated the original, backwater outlet located above the current Eveteš karst spring. At that time, the outlet was periodically active (when the underground stream flowed more rapidly). He and Tomáš Lázár then made the first ascent. Shortly thereafter, members of the Slovak Speleological Society from Rožňava explored and mapped the cave, determining its corridor length to be 780 m, making it the longest cave in the Upper Vyrch at the time. The basic plan of the cave was published in 1984 by Boroš and Ščuka.

In 1996, the cave became a national natural monument. In 1995, together with other monuments, it became part of the UNESCO World Heritage Site under the name of the Caves of the Slovak Karst and the Aggtelecký Karst.

=== 2017–present: Recent years ===
In 2017, an excavation group found more than 200 meters of hidden caves within Hrušovská. As a result of the further work, the total length of the discovered corridors increased to 1,118 m.

In October 2025, there was a collision of two trains near the cave, which resulted in the leakage of operating fluids. The entrance to the Hrušovská Cave was located near the site of the accident, under the railway line. Due to the risk of possible contamination, inspections were issued to visit the Hrušovská Cave and sample the water. Although nothing was found, the Správa slovenských jaskýň stated that they would continue sampling the water throughout 2026.

== Life ==
Four wintering bat species have been observed, mainly the greater horseshoe bat (Rhinolophus ferrumequinum), but rarely the southern horseshoe bat (Rhinolophus euryale). Among invertebrates, the cave contains an endemic form of the cave beetle Duvalius bokori gelidus, found only in the Silická plain of the Slovak Karst. The cave is also a wintering ground for several species of springtails.

== Location ==
The cave is located near the village of Hrušov. The entrance is at an altitude of 295 m above sea level at the foot of a rocky ridge called Soroška, roughly below the southern mouth of the Jablonovský Tunnel.

== See also ==
- List of caves in Slovakia
