= Mountain pass =

Route through a mountain range or over a ridge

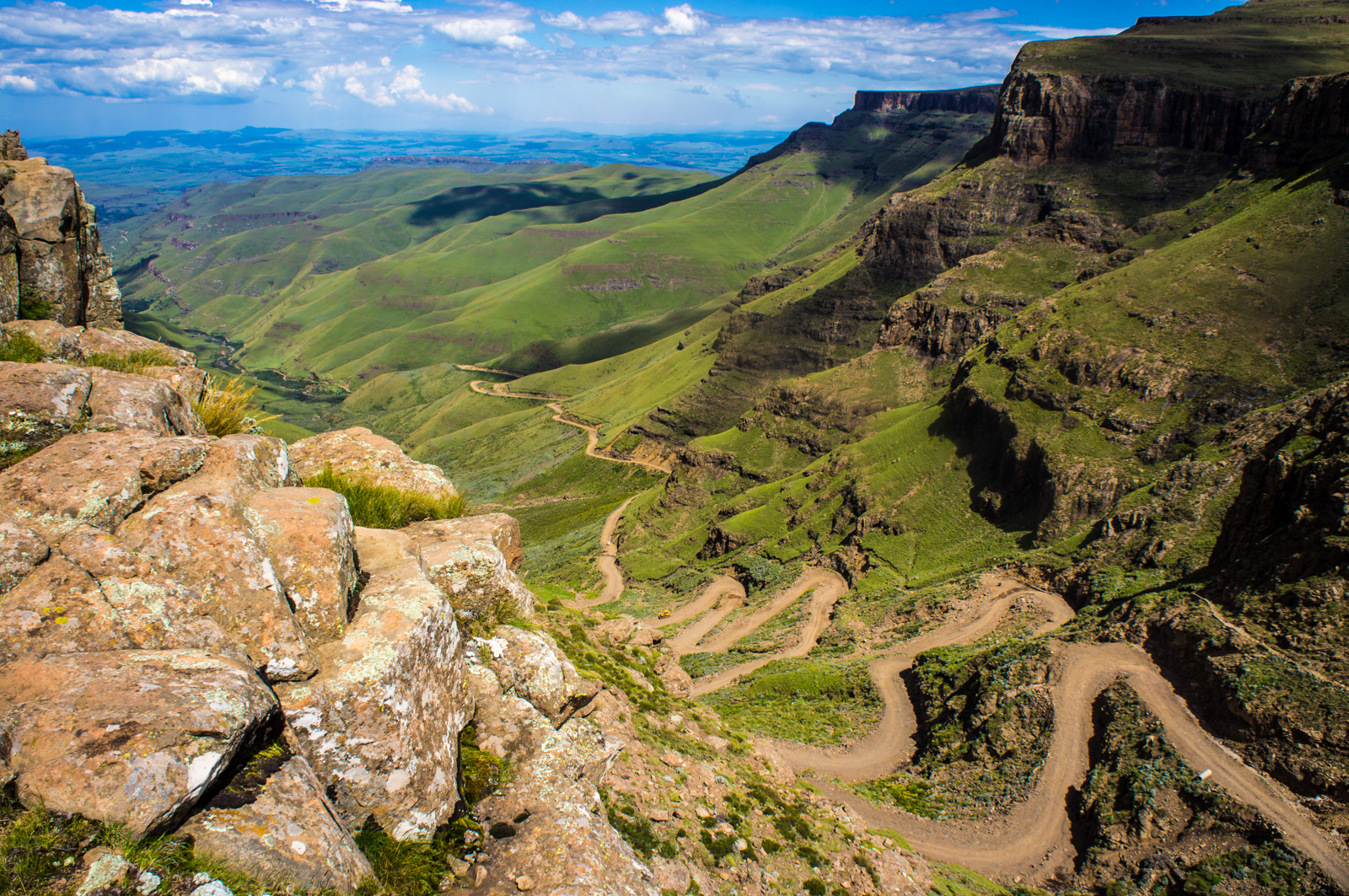
Sani Pass in Mokhotlong, Lesotho

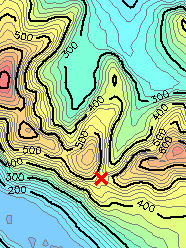
A mountain pass as it may appear on a contour map if there is a navigable route: Bwlch Maesgwm in Snowdonia, north Wales, United Kingdom.

A mountain pass is a navigable route through a mountain range or over a ridge. Since mountain ranges can present formidable barriers to travel, passes have played a key role in trade, war, and both human and animal migration throughout history. At lower elevations it may be called a hill pass. A mountain pass is typically formed between two volcanic peaks or created by erosion from water, ice, or wind.

A narrow pass or gorge between mountains or hills is called defile.

== Overview ==
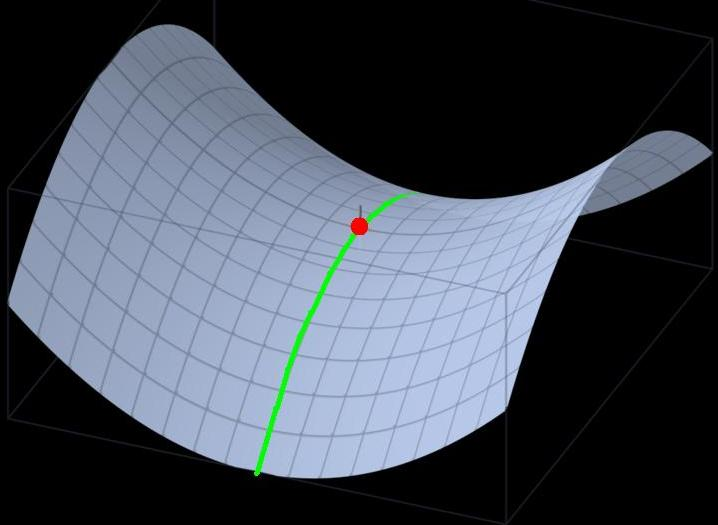
Idealised mountain pass represented as the green line; the saddle point is in red.

Mountain passes make use of a gap, saddle, col or notch. A topographic saddle is analogous to the mathematical concept of a saddle surface, with a saddle point marking the minimum high point between two valleys and the lowest point along a ridge. Saddles, cols and passes can be identified on a topographic map by contour lines with an hourglass shape, which indicates a low spot between two higher points. However, a navigable mountain pass route will not necessarily go through the identified saddle point. If a route is present at all, it may use higher terrain or a tunnel.

Passes are often found just above the source of a river, constituting a drainage divide. A pass may be very short, consisting of steep slopes to the top of the pass, or a valley many kilometers long, whose highest point might only be identifiable by surveying. If the pass has been cut or enlarged by glacier ice overflowing through a pre-existing col, it is termed a 'glacial breach'

Roads and railways have long been built through passes. Some high and rugged passes may have tunnels bored underneath a nearby mountainside, as with the Eisenhower Tunnel bypassing Loveland Pass in the Rockies, to allow faster traffic flow throughout the year.

The top of a pass is frequently the only flat ground in the area, and may be a high vantage point. In some cases this makes it a preferred site for buildings. If a national border follows the ridge of a mountain range, a pass over the mountains is typically on the border, and there may be a border control or customs station, and possibly a military post. For instance, Argentina and Chile share the world's third-longest international border, 5,300 kilometres (3,300 mi) long, which runs north–south along the Andes mountains and includes 42 mountain passes.

Apart from offering relatively easy travel between valleys, passes also provide a route between two mountain tops with a minimum of descent. As a result, it is common for tracks to meet at a pass; this often makes them convenient routes even when travelling between a summit and the valley floor. Passes traditionally were places for trade routes, communications, cultural exchange, military expeditions etc. A typical example is the Brenner Pass in the Alps.

Some mountain passes above the tree line have problems with snow drift in the winter. This might be alleviated by building the road a few meters above the ground, which will make snow blow off the road.

== Synonyms ==
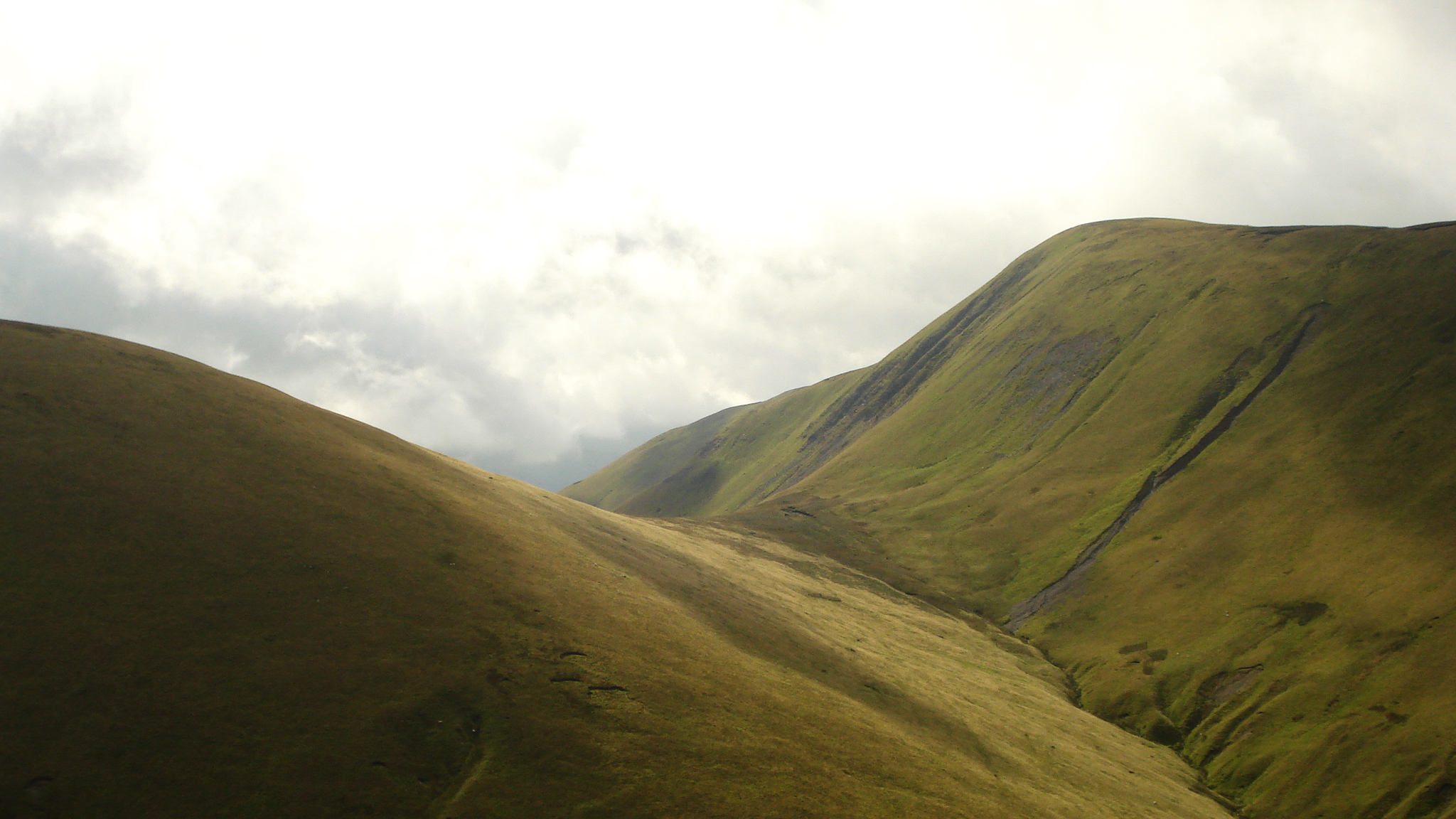
Col between Kensgriff and Yarlsidine in the Howgill Fells, England

There are many words for pass in the English-speaking world. In the United States, pass is very common in the West, the word gap is common in the southern Appalachians, and notch is seen in many parts of New England. The term col, derived from Old French, is also used, particularly in Europe.

In the highest mountain range in the world, the Himalayas, passes are denoted by the suffix "La" in Tibetan, Ladhakhi, and several other regional languages. Examples are the Taglang La at 5,328 m (17,480 ft) on the Leh-Manali highway, and the Sia La at 5,589 m (18,337 ft) in the Eastern Karakoram range.

Scotland has the Gaelic term bealach (anglicised "balloch"), while Wales has the similar bwlch (both being insular Celtic languages). In the Lake District of north-west England, the term hause is often used, although the term pass is also common—one distinction is that a pass can refer to a route, as well as the highest part thereof, while a hause is simply that highest part, often flattened somewhat into a high-level plateau.

In Japan they are known as tōge, which means "pass" in Japanese. The word can also refer to narrow, winding roads that can be found in and around mountains and geographically similar areas, or specifically to a style of street racing which may take place on these roads.

== Around the world ==
There are thousands of named passes around the world, some of which are well-known, such as the Khyber Pass close to the present-day Afghanistan-Pakistan border on the ancient Silk Road, the Great St. Bernard Pass at 2,473 metres (8,114 ft) in the Alps, the Chang La at 5,360 metres (17,590 ft), the Khardung La at 5,359 metres (17,582 ft) in Ladakh, India and the Palakkad Gap at 140 metres (460 ft) in Palakkad, Kerala, India, which is the widest mountain pass in the world. The roads at Mana Pass at 5,610 metres (18,410 ft) and Marsimik La at 5,582 metres (18,314 ft), on and near the China–India border respectively, appear to be world's two highest motorable passes. Khunjerab Pass between Pakistan and China at 4,693 metres (15,397 ft) is also a high-altitude motorable mountain pass. One of the famous but non-motorable mountain passes is Thorong La at 5,416 metres (17,769 ft) in Annapurna Conservation Area, Nepal.

== Gallery ==
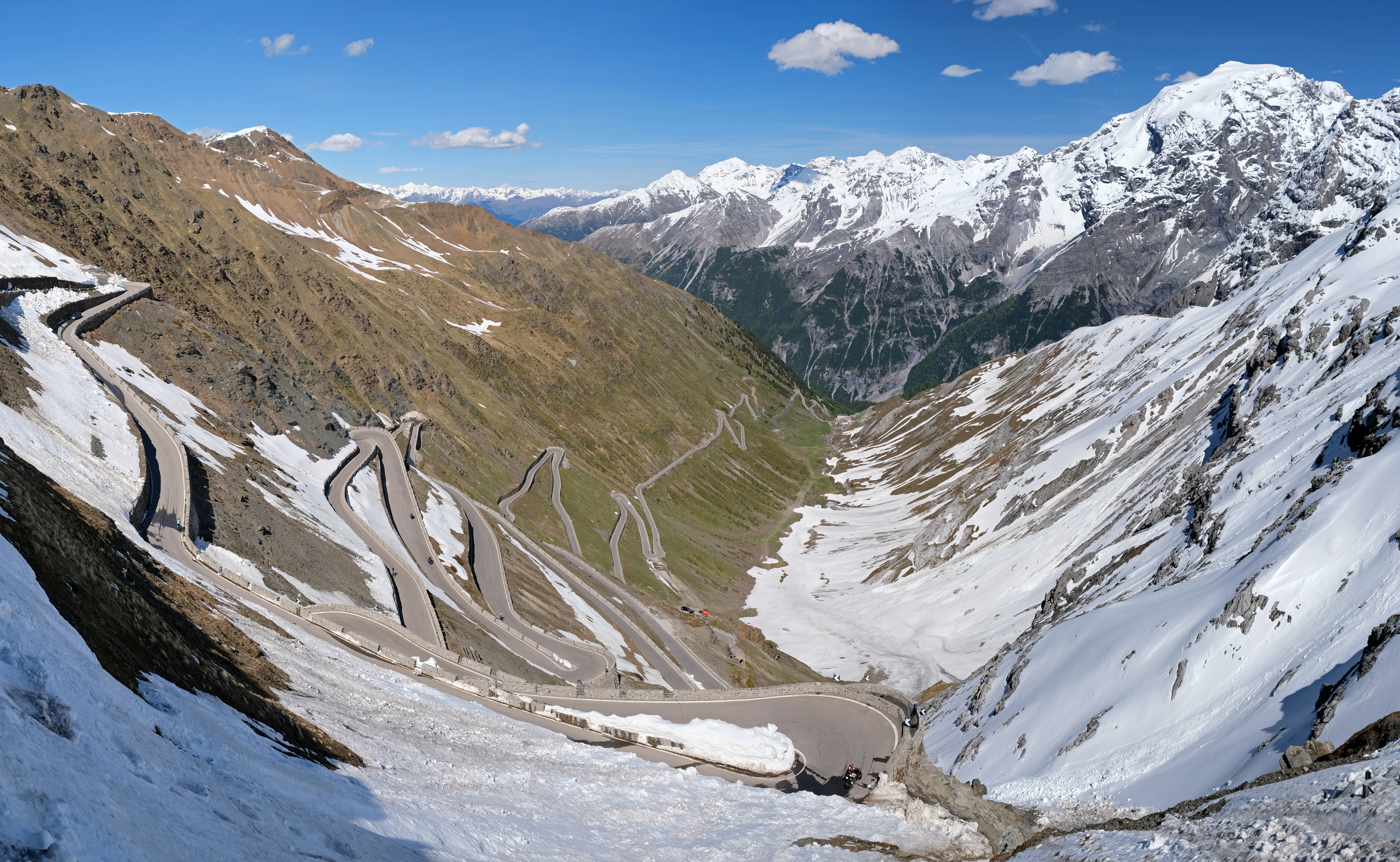
Stelvio Pass in the Alps (Italy)

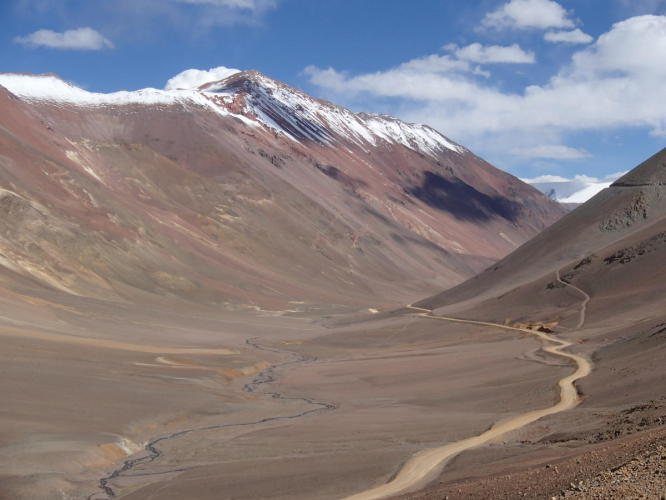
Agua Negra Pass between Argentina and Chile.

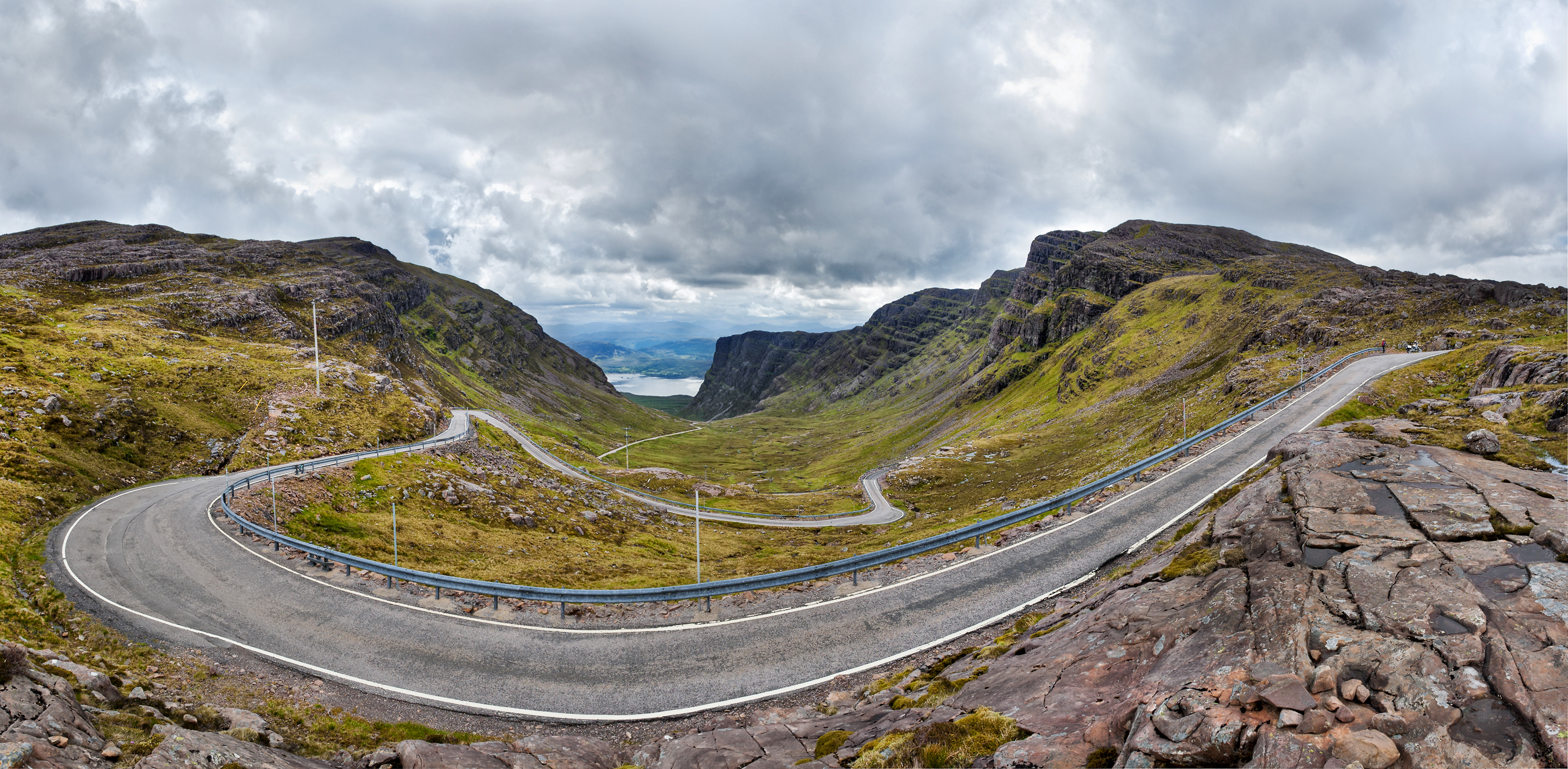
The Bealach na Bà linking Applecross in the Scottish North-west Highlands.

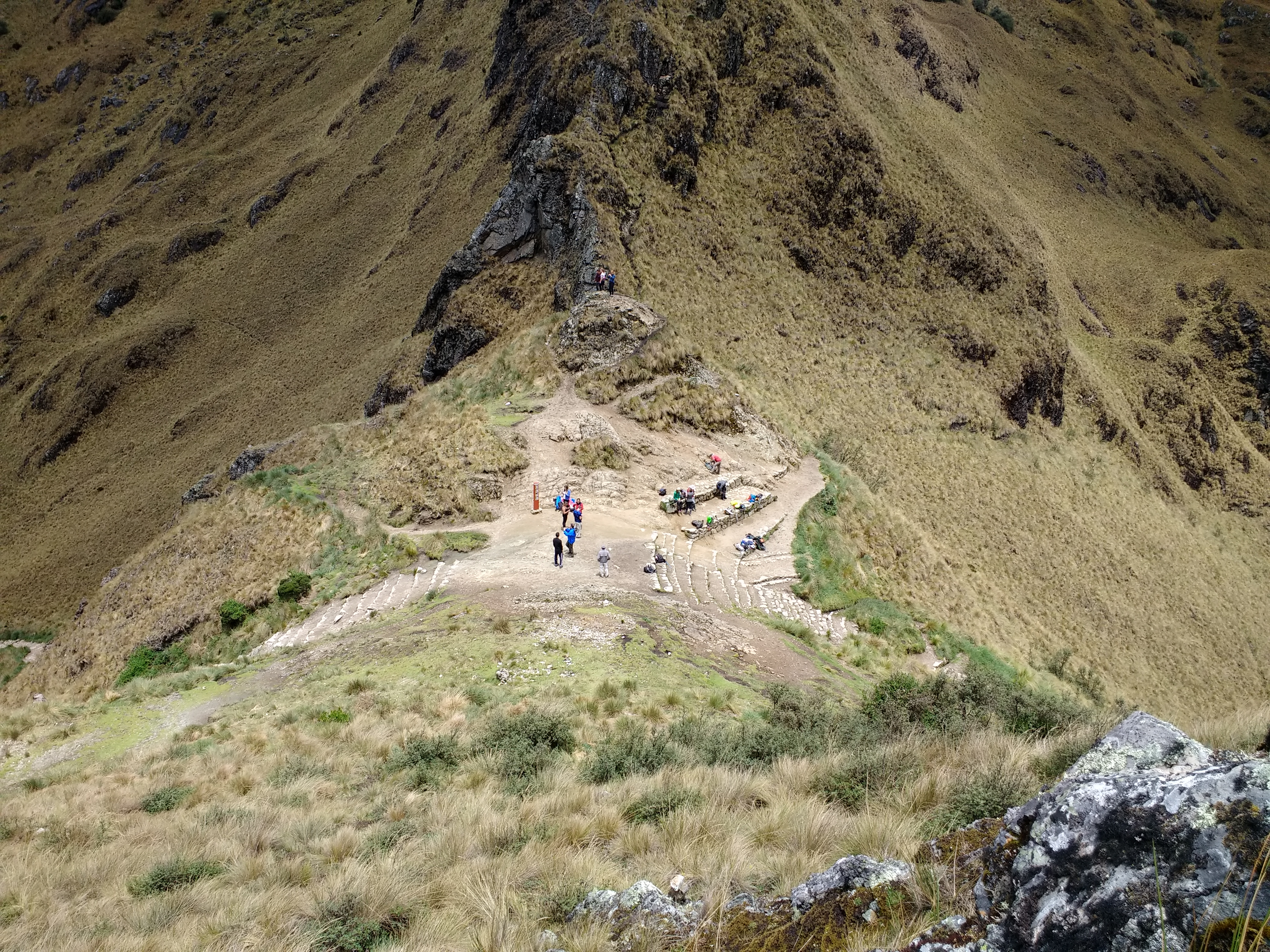
Dead Woman's Pass on the Inca Trail to Machu Picchu in Peru

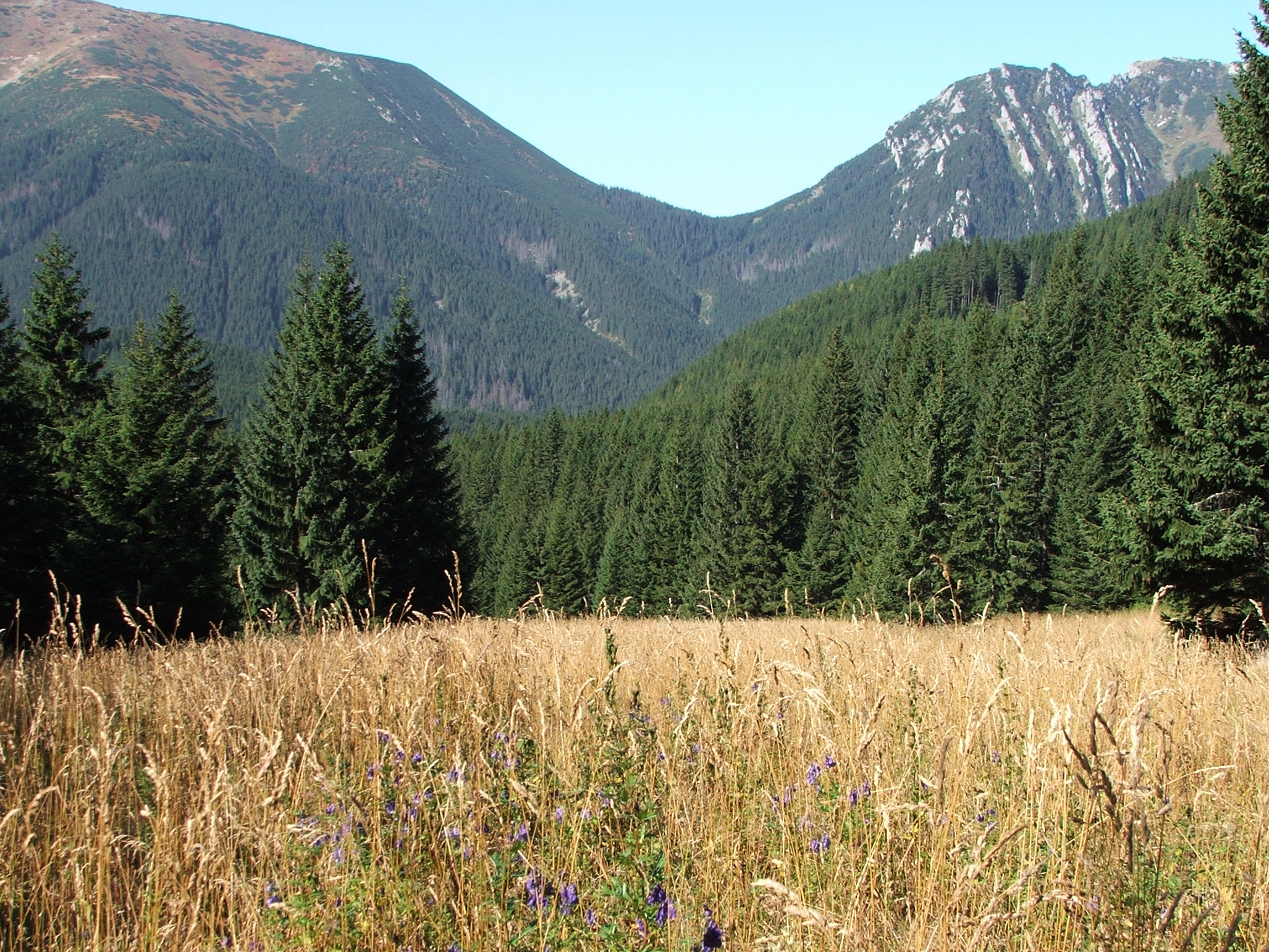
Iwaniacka Pass in Tatras (near Kominiarski Wierch, Poland).

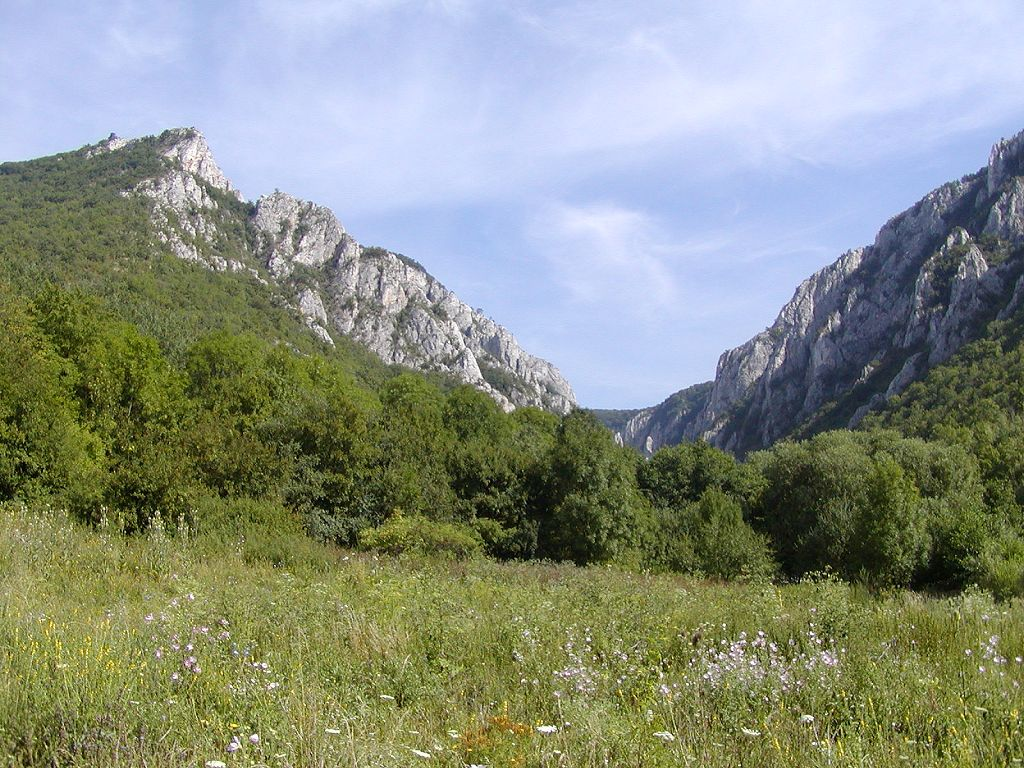
Zádielska tiesňava Pass in Slovak Karst (Slovakia).

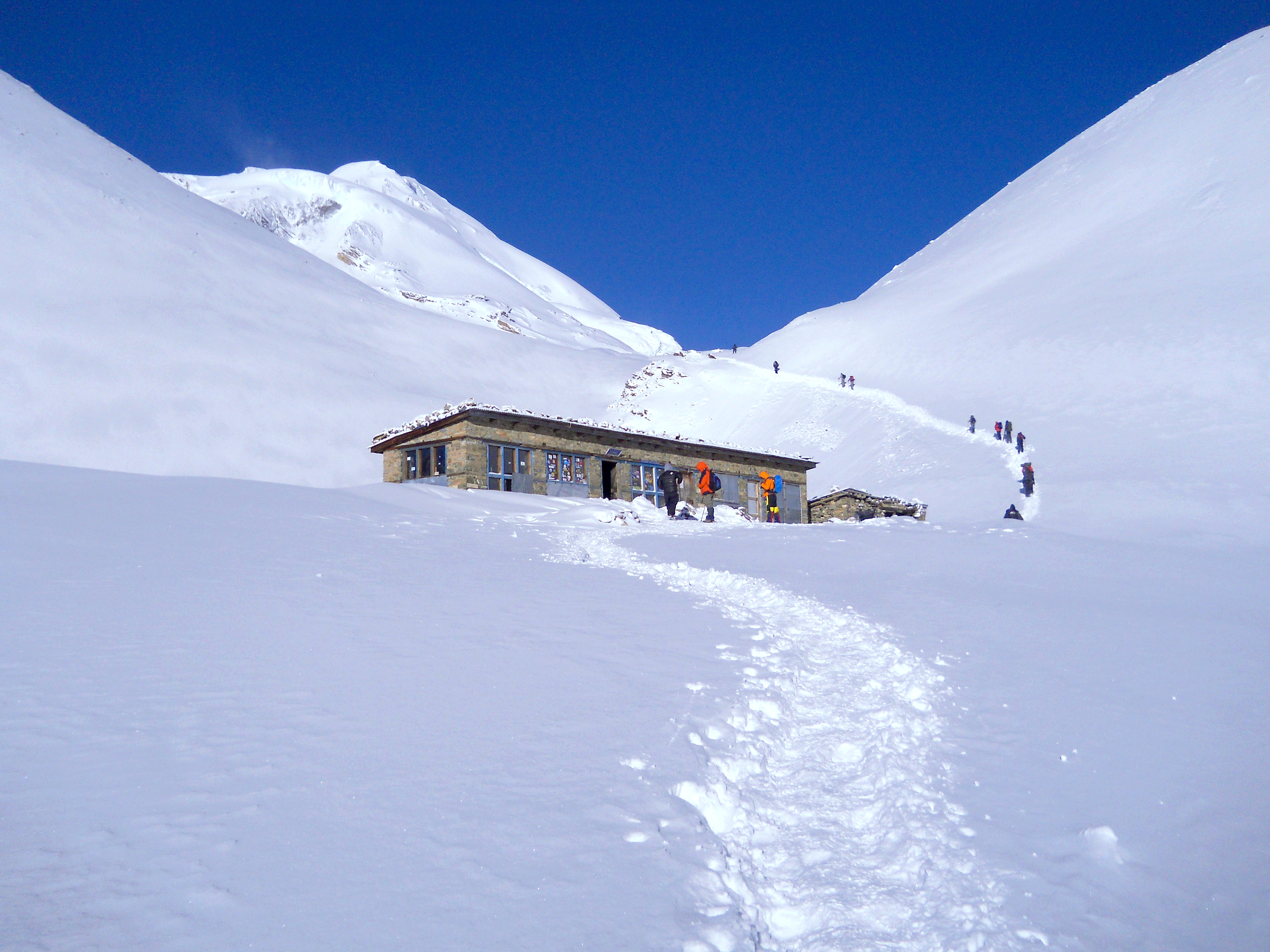
Trail from Manang to Mustang via Thorong La pass, Nepal.

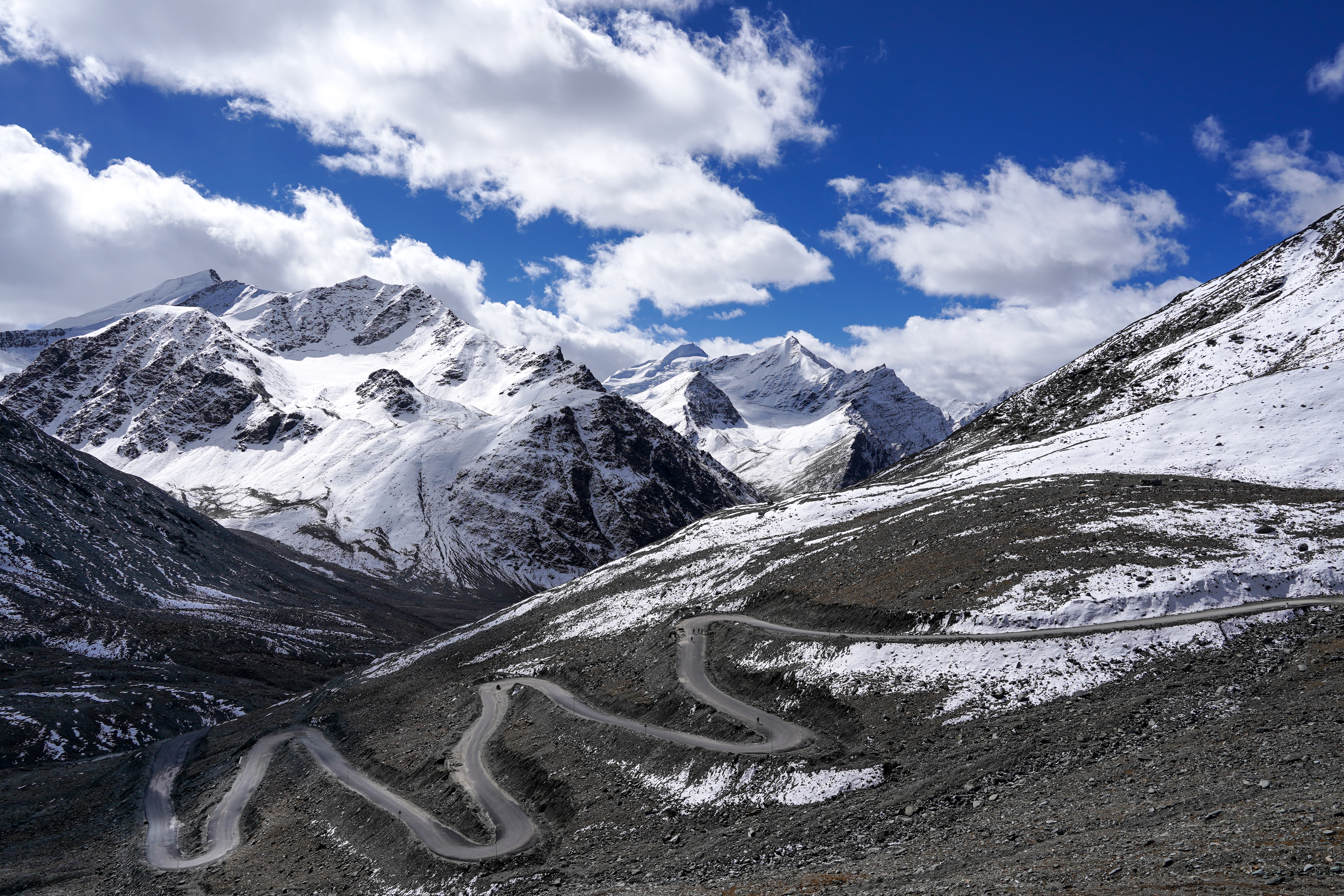
Winding road below Shingo La in Himachal Pradesh, India

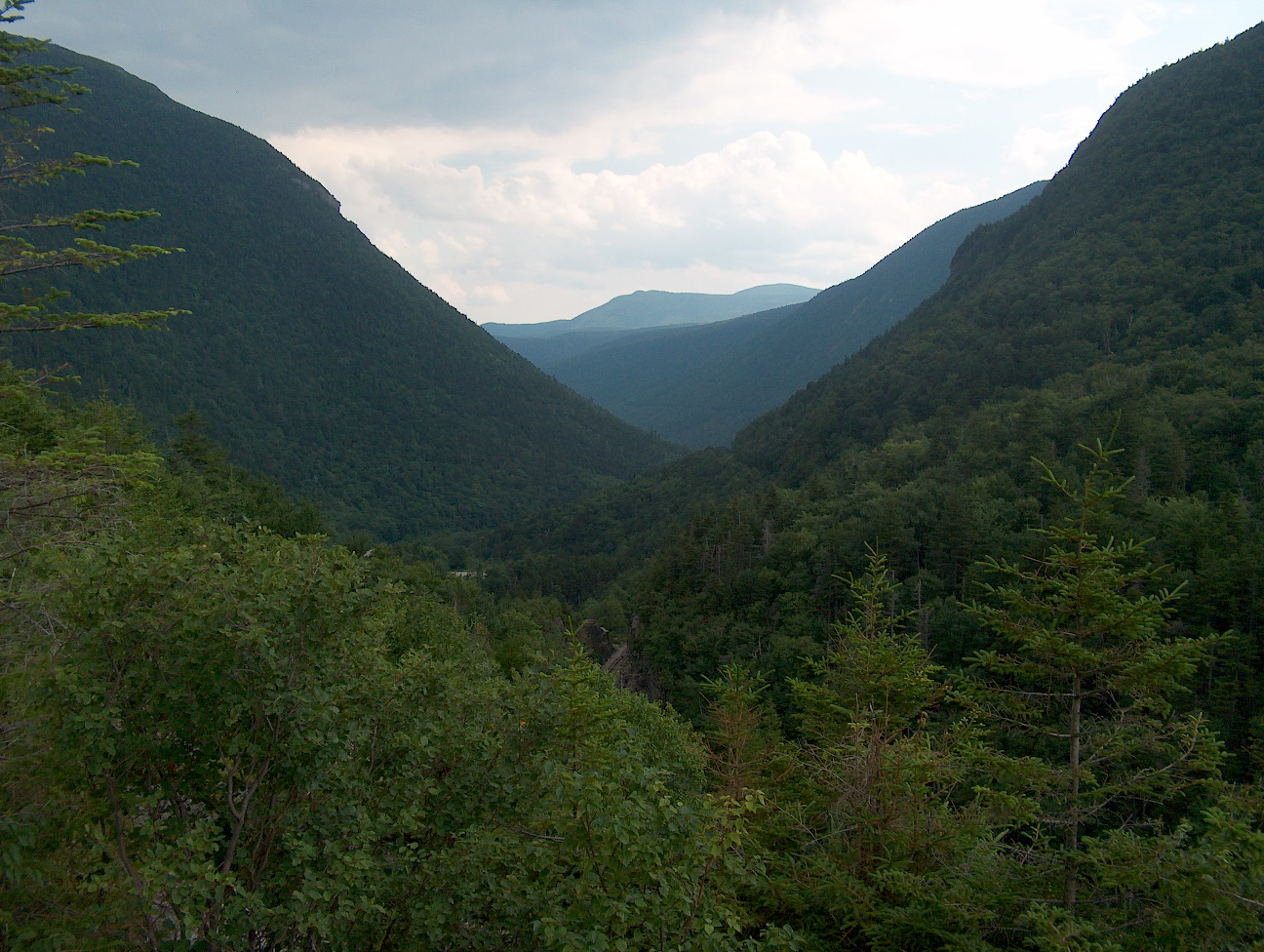
Crawford Notch in New Hampshire, U.S.

== See also ==
- List of mountain passes
- Defile – Narrow pass or gorge between mountains or hills
- Water gap – Geological feature formed through a mountain
- Wind gap – Topographic gap made by a former waterway
