= List of caves in Slovakia =

There are more than 2,400 caves in Slovakia, of which more than 400 have been explored so far. New caves are being discovered constantly.

== Caves open to the public ==
- caves included in the UNESCO World Heritage Sites list:
  - Dobšiná Ice Cave (Dobšinská ľadová jaskyňa), Slovak Paradise
  - Domica, Slovak Karst
  - Gombasek Cave (Gombasecká jaskyňa), Slovak Karst
  - Jasovská Cave (Jasovská jaskyňa), Slovak Karst
  - Ochtinská Aragonite Cave (Ochtinská aragonitová jaskyňa), Slovak Karst
- other public caves:
  - Belianska Cave, Tatras
  - Bojnická hradná jaskyňa (literally Bojnice Castle Cave), Bojnice
  - Brestovská Cave (Brestovská jaskyňa), Western Tatras
  - Bystrianska Cave (Bystrianska jaskyňa), Low Tatras
  - Cave of Dead Bats (Jaskyňa mŕtvych netopierov), Low Tatras
  - out of the Demänová Caves (23 kilometres (14 mi) long), Low Tatras:
    - Demänovská jaskyňa Slobody (literally Demänová Cave of Freedom)
    - Demänovská Ice Cave (Demänovská ľadová jaskyňa)
  - Driny, Little Carpathians
  - Harmanecká Cave (Harmanecká jaskyňa), Staré Hory Mountains (Starohorské vrchy)
  - Važecká Cave (Važecká jaskyňa), Liptov Basin
  - Krásnohorská Cave (Krásna Hôrka Cave), Slovak Karst
  - Stanišovská Cave, Jánska valley
  - Bad Hole (Jaskyňa zlá diera), Bachureň

== Other caves ==
Note: The list is incomplete

- Diviačia priepasť (literally Boar Pit Cave), Slovak Karst
- Medvedia jaskyňa (Bear Cave), Slovak Paradise
- Demänová Caves (other than those mentioned above), Low Tatras
- Čertova diera (Devil's Hole), Slovak Karst
- Drienovská jaskyňa (Drienovec Cave), Slovak Karst
- Brázda, Slovak Karst
- Krásnohorská Cave (Krásna Hôrka Cave), Slovak Karst
- Malá železná priepasť (Little Iron Pit Cave), Slovak Karst
- Javorová priepasť (Maple Pit Cave), Low Tatras
- Mesačný tieň (Moon Shadow Cave), High Tatras
- Starý hrad (Old Castle), Low Tatras (the deepest cave in Slovakia)
- Silická ľadnica (Silica Ice Cave), Slovak Karst
- Hrušovská cave, Slovak Karst

== See also ==
- List of caves
- Speleology
