= Jasov Cave =

Cave and archaeological site in Slovakia

UNESCO World Heritage Site
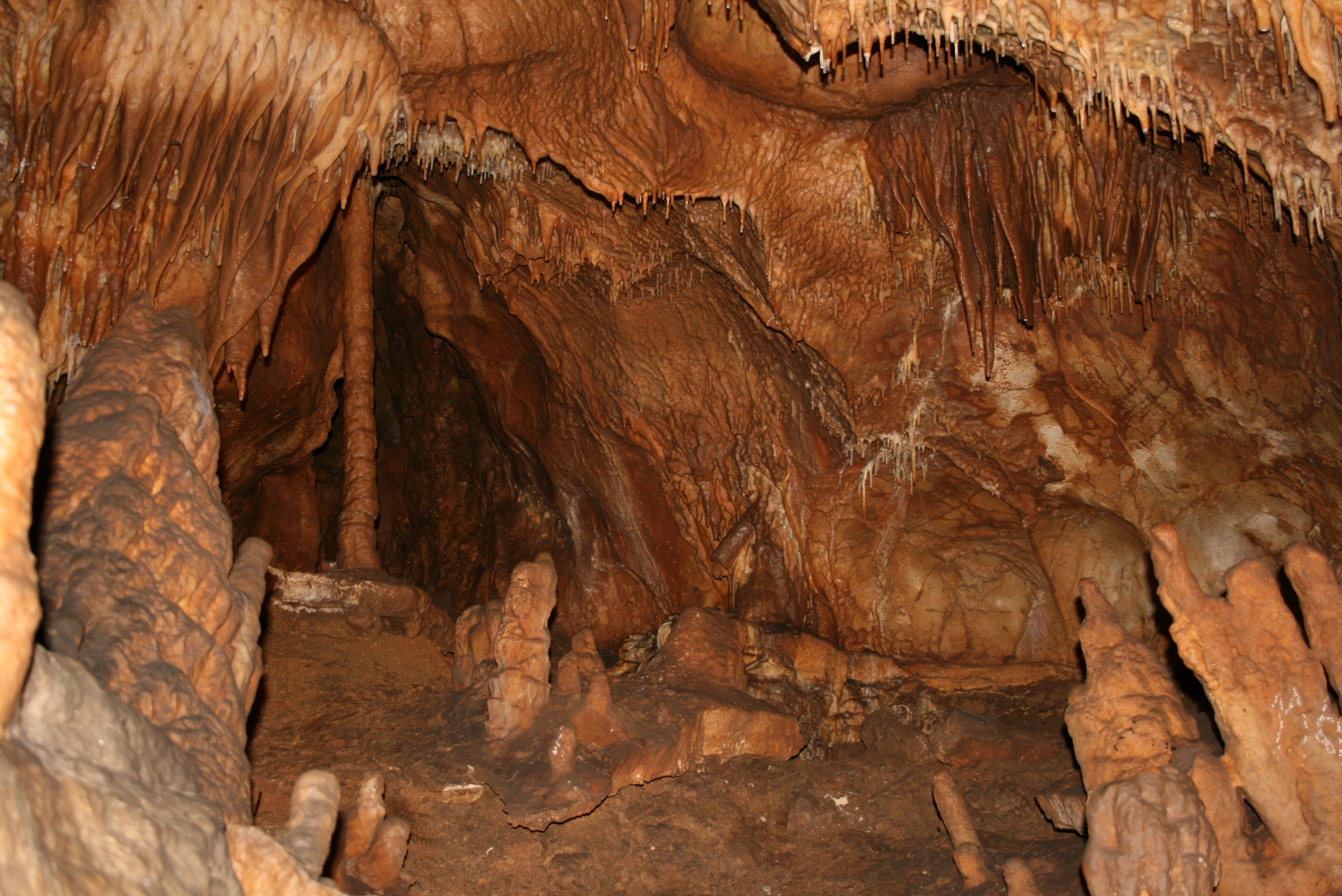
- The Jasov Cave

- Location within Košice Region Location within Slovakia
- Location: Košice-okolie District, Košice Region, Slovakia
- Part of: "Component neighbouring Silica and Jasov" part of Caves of Aggtelek Karst and Slovak Karst
- Criteria: Natural: (viii)
- Reference: 725ter-004
- Inscription: 1995 (19th Session)
- Extensions: 2000, 2008
- Coordinates: 48°40′43.91″N 20°58′15.30″E

Jasov Cave (Slovak: Jasovská jaskyňa, and Hungarian: Jászói barlang) is a speleothem limestone cave and archaeological site in the Slovak Karst in Slovakia. It is located near the village of Jasov, around 25 km (16 mi) from Košice city. Along with a number of caves of the Slovak Karst, Jasov Cave has been added to the UNESCO World Heritage list as a part of the Caves of Aggtelek Karst and Slovak Karst site, because of its unique diversity of speleothems and its testimony to tropical and temperate cave-forming processes. The cave is known for its pagoda-like stalagmites, sinter waterfalls, and straw stalactites.

Jasov Cave is a total of 2.8 km long, with an air temperature that ranges from 8.8 and 9.4°C. The cave provides habitat for 18 species of bats, and remains of the extinct cave bear and cave hyena have been discovered within the cave.

== History ==
Jasov Cave was partly opened for the public in 1846, making it the oldest publicly accessible cave in Slovakia. The lower parts of the cave were discovered in 1922 to 1924 and a concrete footpath was built and electrical lighting was installed in 1924. 852 metres (2,795 feet) out of 2,148 metres (7,047 feet) are open to the public.

Many archaeological discoveries of the Paleolithic, Neolith and the Hallstatt periods have been made in the cave.

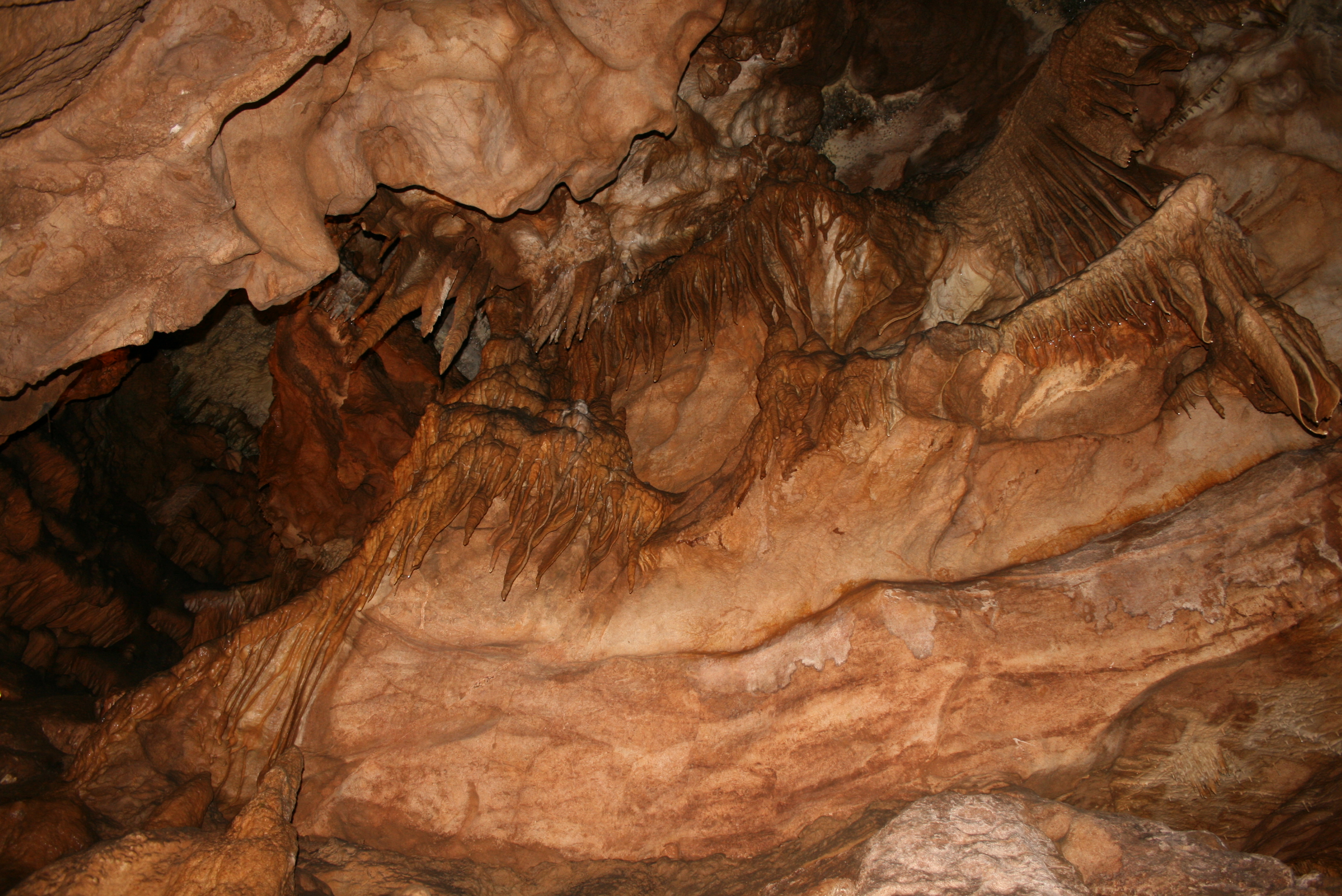
Jasov Cave

== See also ==
- List of caves in Slovakia
