= Gombasek Cave =

Gombasecká Cave
UNESCO World Heritage Site
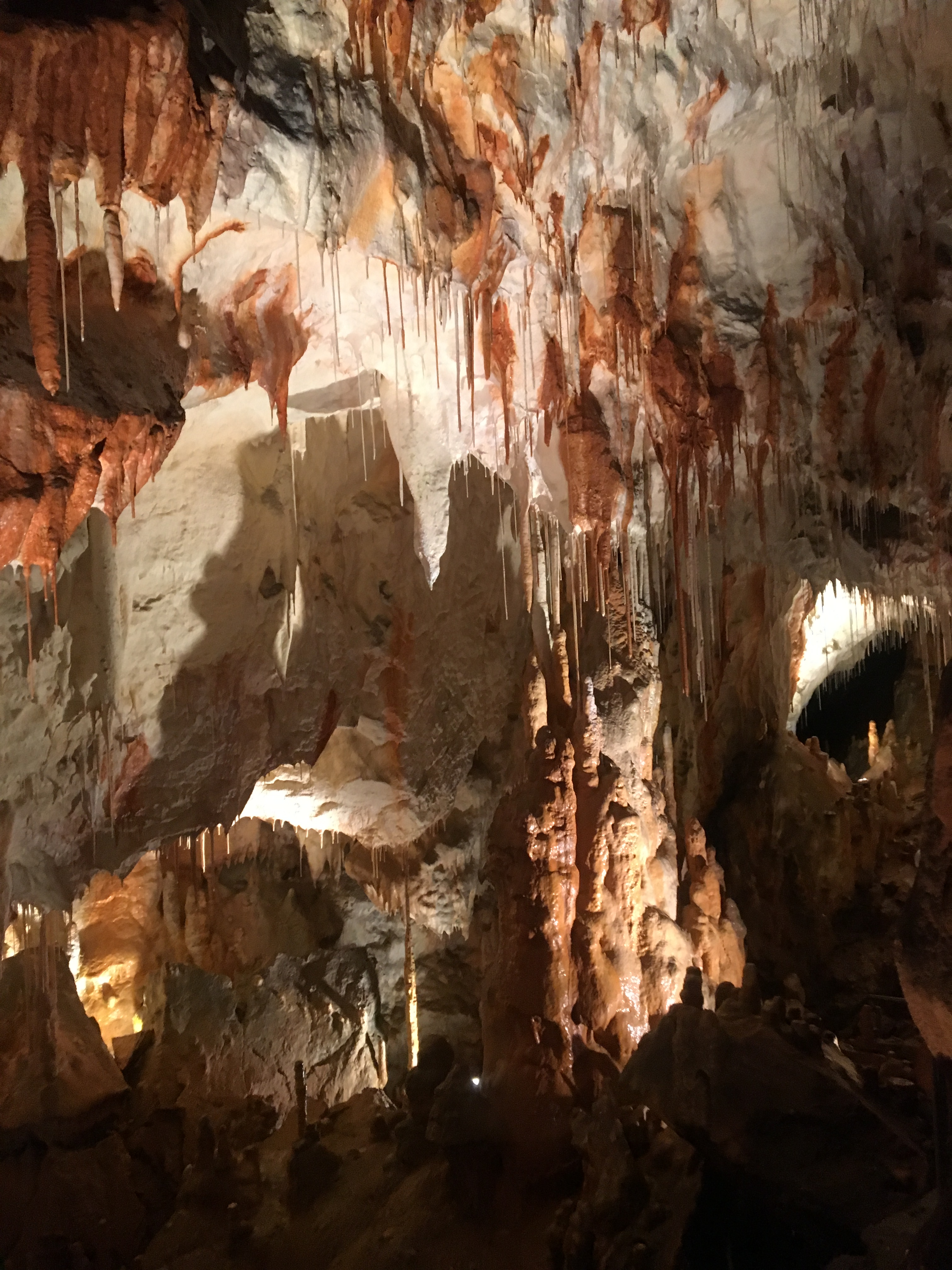

- Location within Slovakia
- Location: Rožňava District, Slovakia
- Part of: Caves of Aggtelek Karst and Slovak Karst
- Criteria: Natural: viii
- Reference: 725ter
- Inscription: 1995 (19th Session)
- Extensions: 2000, 2008
- Coordinates: 48.5628014°N 20.4664993°E

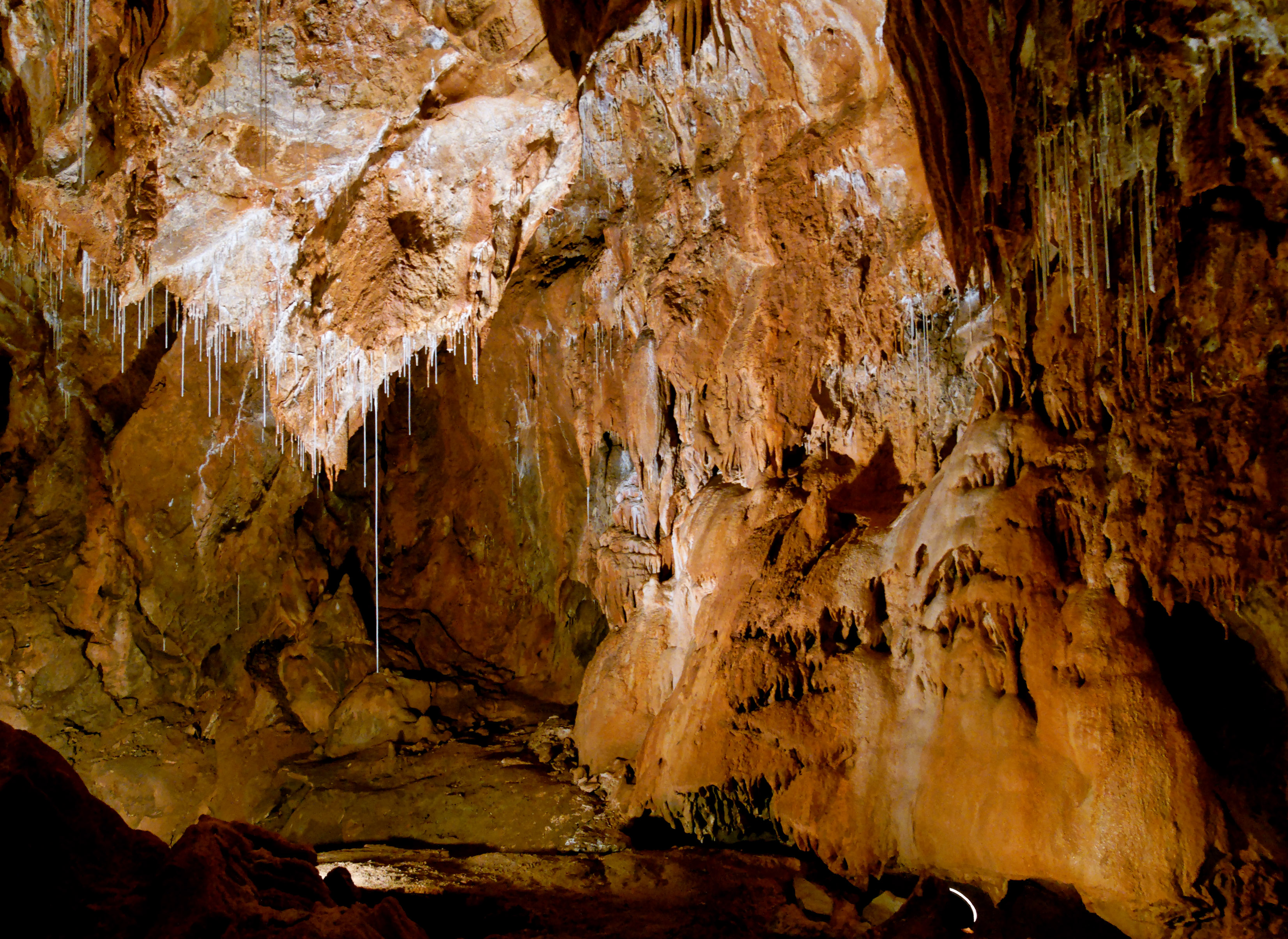
The Marble Hall

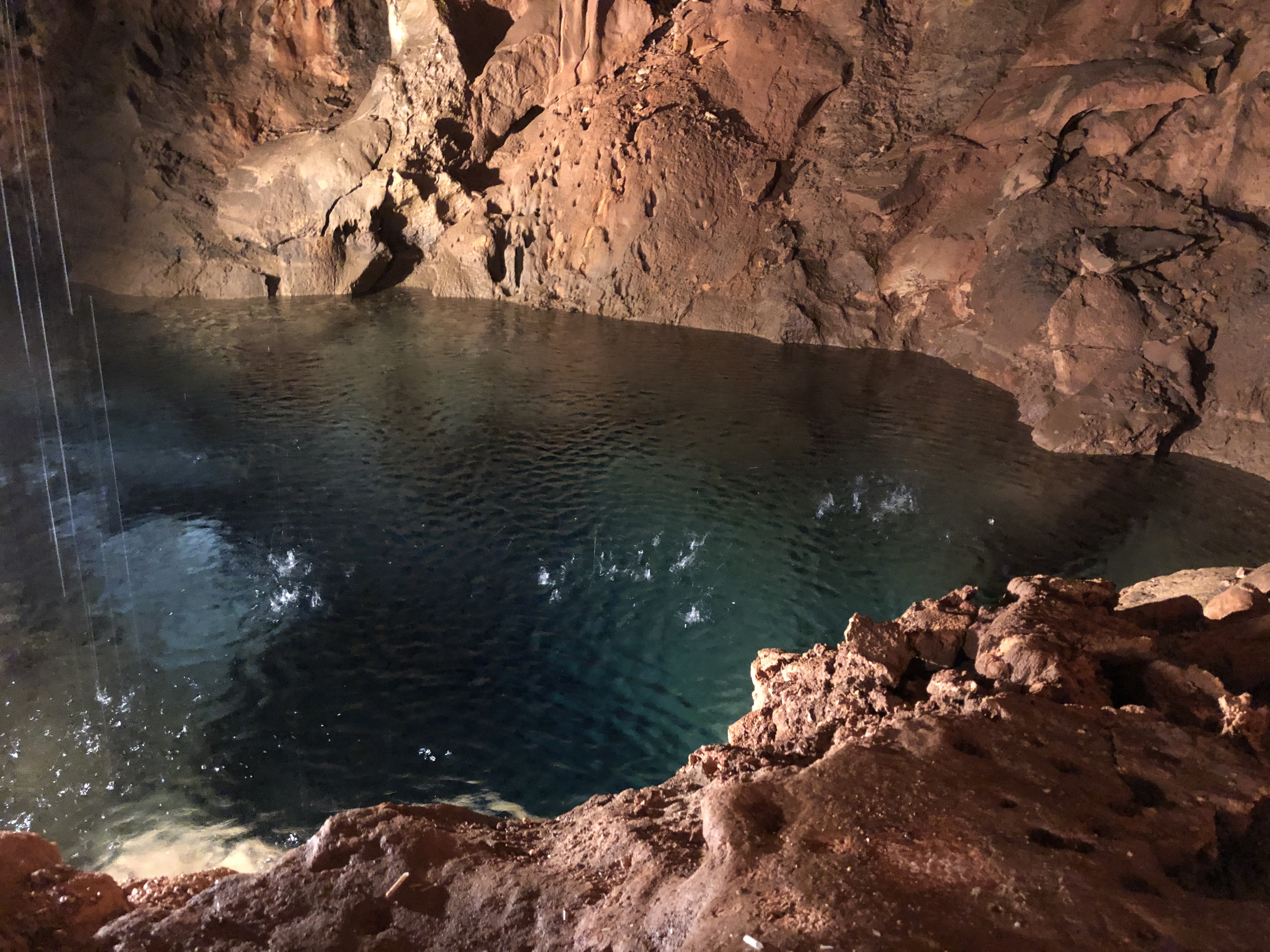
The Marble Well

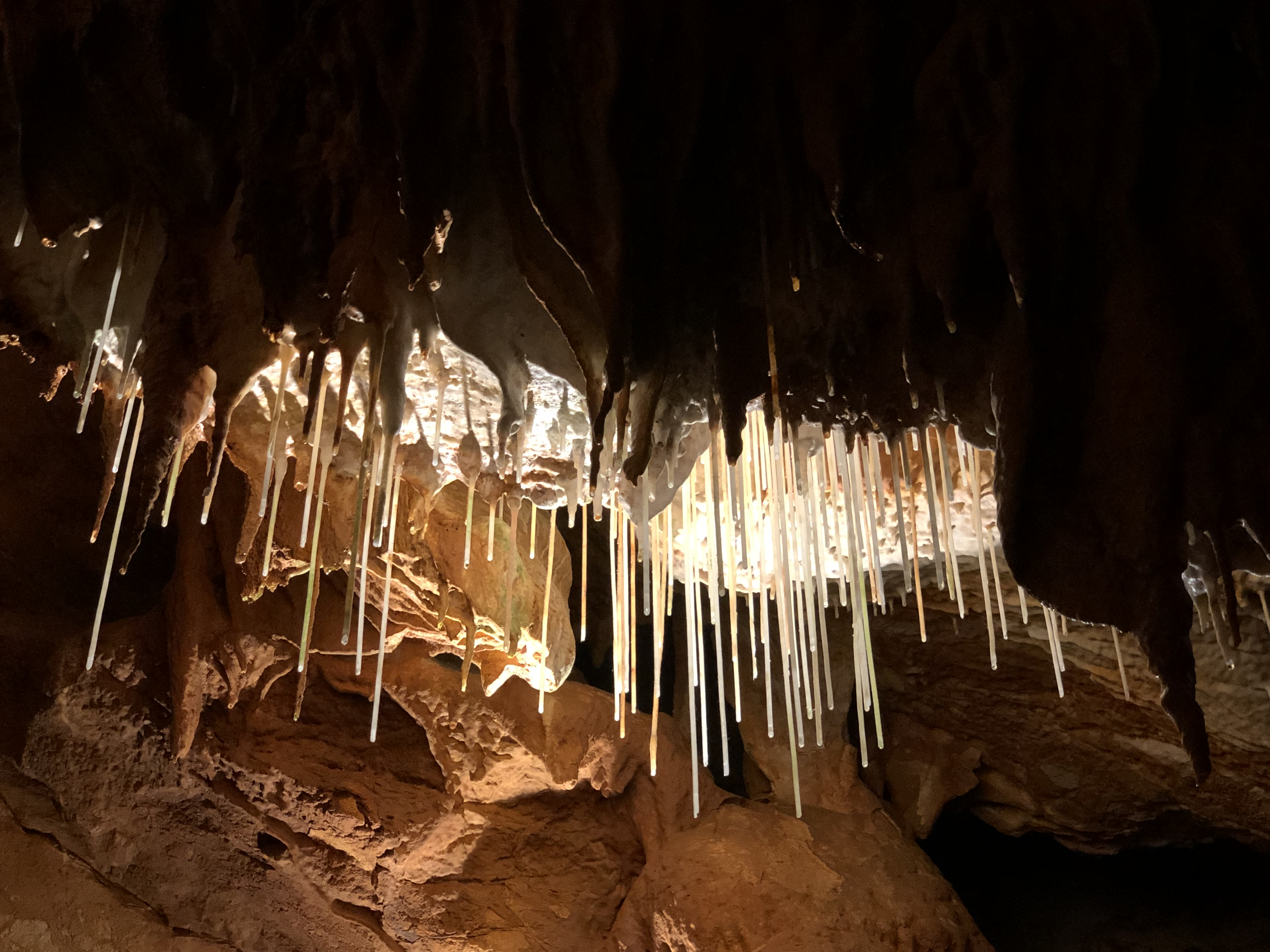
Straw stalactite decoration

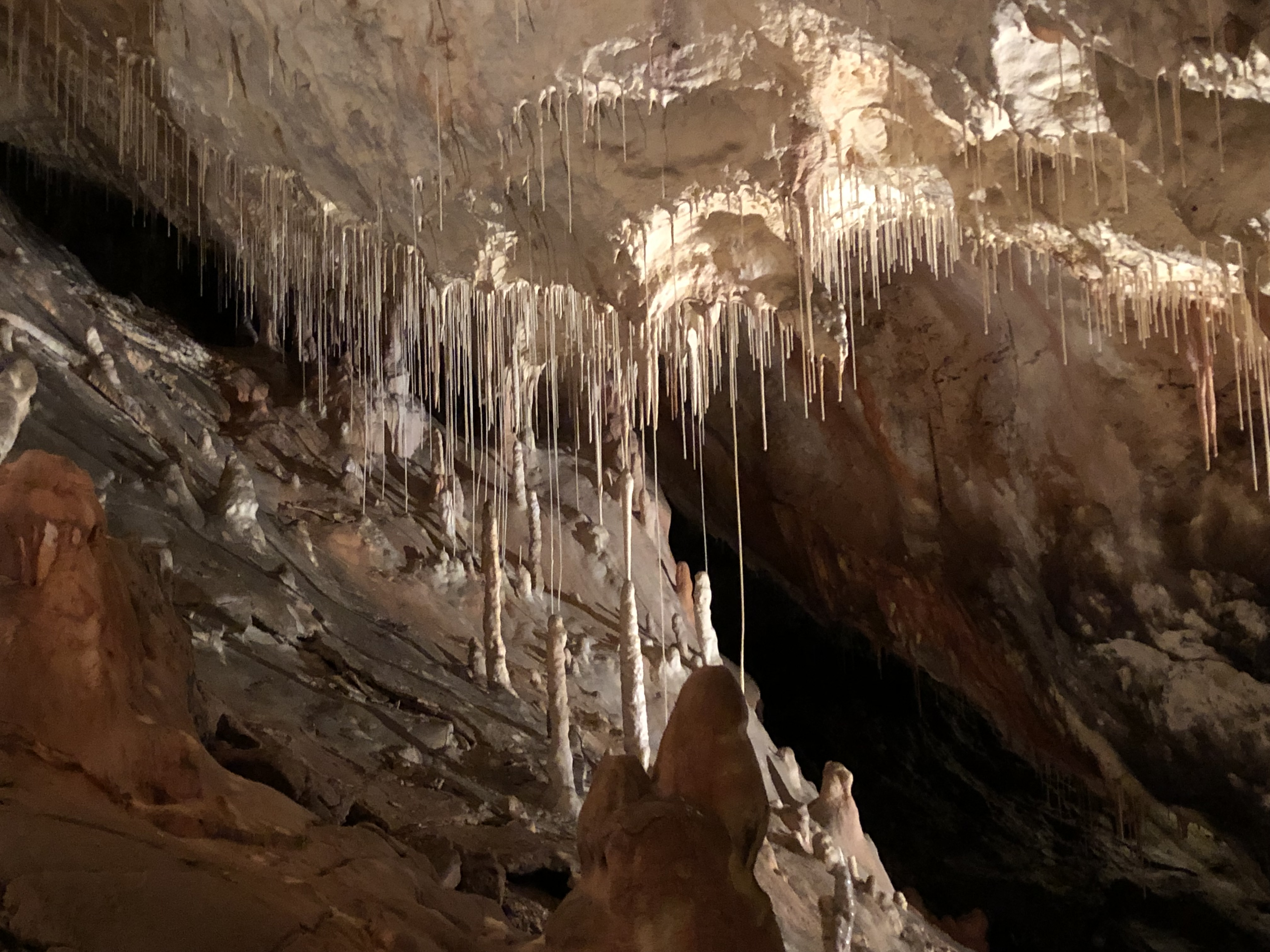
Straw stalactite decoration in the Hall of Wisdom

Gombasek Cave or Gombasecká jaskyňa (in Slovak) and Gombaszögi-barlang (in Hungarian) is a karst cave in the Slovak Karst, Slovakia. It is named after the settlement of Gombasek, which belongs to the village of Slavec. It is located in the Slovak Karst National Park, in the Slaná river valley, approximately 15 km south of Rožňava. The cave was discovered on 21 November 1951 by volunteer cavers. In 1955, 285 m out of 1 525 m were opened to the public. Currently, the route for visitors is 530 m long and takes about 30 minutes.

The cave was also used for "speleotherapy" as a sanatorium, focused on airway diseases. Since 1995, the Gombasek Cave is included in the UNESCO World Heritage List as a part of the Caves of Aggtelek Karst and Slovak Karst site because of its exemplary speleothems and its record of karst formation under varying conditions, including periods of glaciation and temperate, and tropical climatic conditions.

== See also ==
- List of caves in Slovakia
