= Bystrianska Cave =

Limestone cave in Slovakia

- Bystrianska jaskyňa
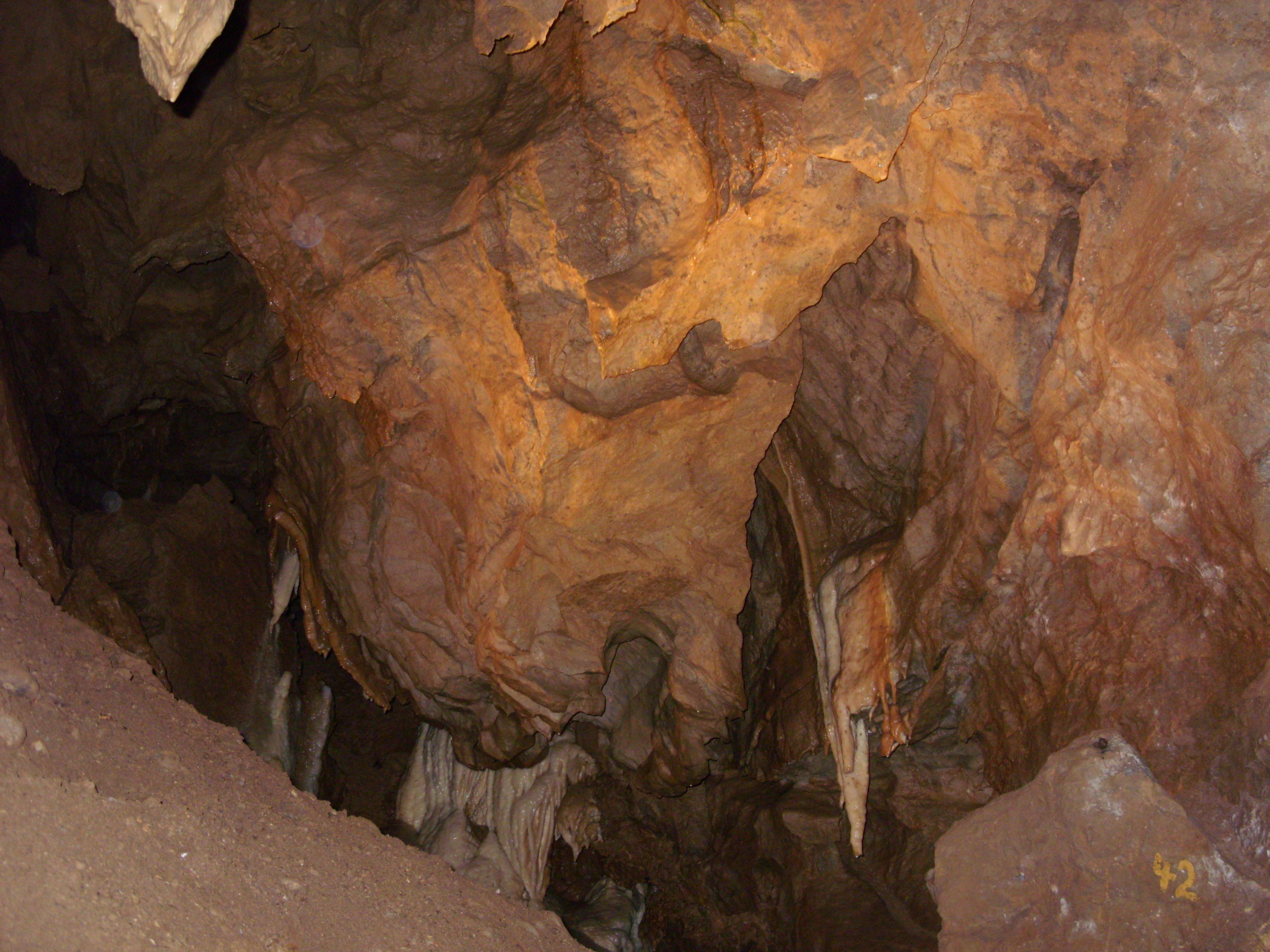
- Interior of the Bystrianska Cave

- Location within Central Europe
- Coordinates: 48°50′25″N 19°35′46″E
- Depth: 95 metres (312 ft)
- Length: 2,637 metres (8,652 ft)
- Geology: Limestone
- Difficulty: Tour 580m long, almost flat
- Access: Tours daily except Monday
- Features: Speleotherapy area, stalactites
- Website: www.ssj.sk/en/jaskyna/3-bystrianska-cave

Bystrianska Cave is a limestone cave located on the southern slopes of the Nizke Tatry Mountains, along the road towards Banska Bystrica, at the southern edge of the town of Bystrá, in the Brezno District, Banskobystrický region, in Slovakia.

== History ==
The old parts of the cave have been known already in the prehistoric times. Though the precipice Peklo the new parts have been discovered by E. and A. Hollmann and J. Kovalčík in 1926. In 1951 the Mostárenské Hall was discovered. The lower entrance to the cave was opened in 1932. The Old and New Cave were connected by J. Majko and J. Vytřísalová together with their colleagues in 1955. About 490 metres (1,610 ft) of the cave has been made public in 1968. The Lower Guerilla Hall and some other parts of the cave have been used for speleotherapy since 1971.

== Description ==
The cave consists primarily of dark limestone rocks of the middle trias, formed in tectonic cracks by water corrosion, the demolition of some parts of the ceiling and gradually enlarged by the underground river Bystra. An underground stream still flows through the bottom part of the cave, springing out in the village of Valaska. The embellishment of the cave consists of stalactites and stalagmites, from which Zvonivé stalaktity (Ringing statlctites), Beldachýn (Baldaquin) and Kovacska vyhna (Blacksmith's workshop) are specially remarkable. Except for many erosive forms a ceiling river-bed is to be seen in the cave, in which the round granit stones of the Low Tatras are attached by sinter. The cave is 2,637 metres (8,652 ft) in length and 95 metres (312 ft) in depth. It is the most important cave of the Upper Hron River Valley.

In the largest dome there is a memorial tablet commemorating the partisan who was shot dead by fascist soldiers directly in the cave. Aside the sightseeing tour there is a medical hall used presently for curing the respiratory diseases of children (speleotherapy).

== See also ==
- List of caves in Slovakia
