= Slovak Karst National Park =

National park in Slovakia

Slovak Karst National Park Národný park Slovenský kras
- IUCN category II (national park)
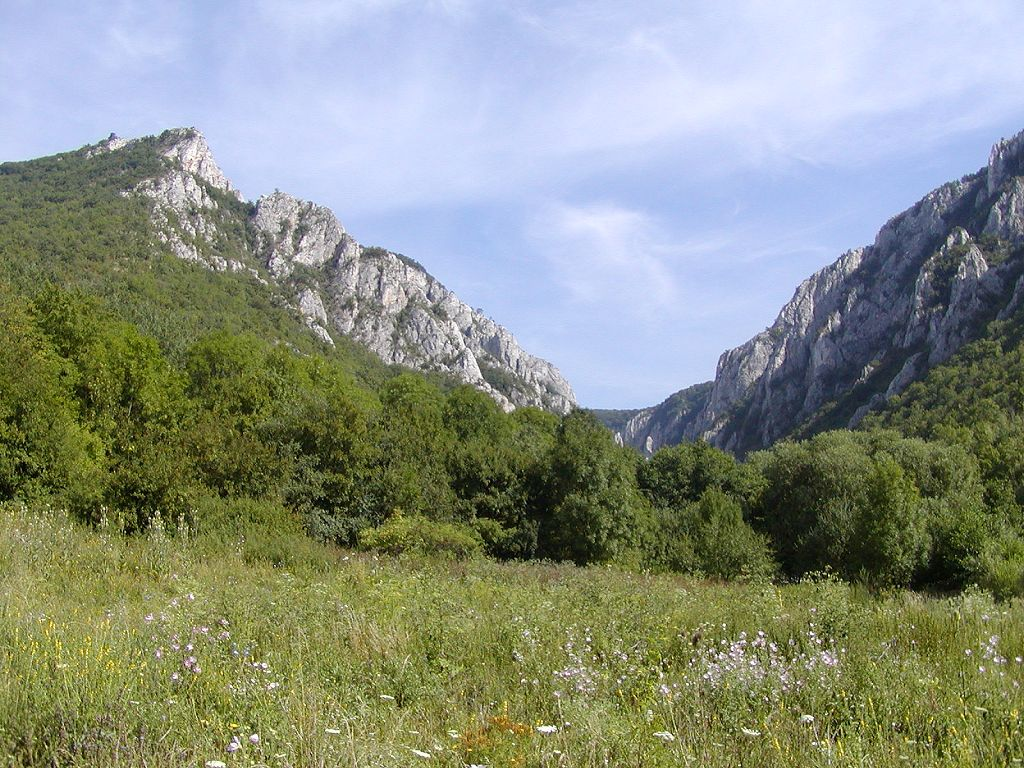
- Zádielska tiesňava canyon
- Interactive map of Slovak Karst National Park; Národný park Slovenský kras
- Location: South East Slovakia, Slovak Karst mountain range
- Coordinates: 48°36′00″N 20°31′44″E
- Area: 346.11 km^{2} (133.63 sq mi)
- Established: 1 March 2002
- Governing body: Správa Národného parku Slovenský kras (Slovak Karst National Park Administration) in Brzotín

Slovak Karst National Park (Národný park Slovenský kras) is a national park in the Slovak Karst (Slovenský kras) mountain range in South East Slovakia. It lies in the Gelnica, Rožňava and Košice–okolie districts in the Košice region. The National Park covers an area of 346.11 km² (133.64 mi²) and its buffer zone covers 117.41 km² (45.33 mi²).

The park was established on 1 March 2002, after being a protected landscape area since 1973. Slovak Karst is the first Slovak biosphere reserve since 1 March 1977, when it was included in the UNESCO's Programme on Man and the Biosphere. In 1995, 12 out of 700 caves in the park were recognized as a UNESCO World Heritage Site.

== See also ==
- Caves of Aggtelek Karst and Slovak Karst UNESCO World Heritage site
- Protected areas of Slovakia
