= Hrušov, Rožňava District =

Village and municipality in Slovakia

Hrušov Körtvélyes
- Municipality
- Flag

- Location of Hrušov in the Košice Region Location of Hrušov in Slovakia
- Coordinates: 48.58°N 20.63°E
- Country: Slovakia
- Region: Košice Region
- District: Rožňava District
- First mentioned: 1285

Area
  - Total: 16.78 km^{2} (6.48 sq mi)
- Elevation: 232 m (761 ft)

Population (2025)
  - Total: 323
- Time zone: UTC+1 (CET)
  - Summer (DST): UTC+2 (CEST)
- Postal code: 491 3
- Area code: +421 58
- Vehicle registration plate (until 2022): RV
- Website: www.obechrusov.sk

Hrušov (Hungarian: Körtvélyes) is a village and municipality in the Rožňava District in the Košice Region of middle-eastern Slovakia.

== History ==
In historical records the village was first mentioned in 1285. Before the establishment of independent Czechoslovakia in 1918, Hrušov was part of Abaúj-Torna County within the Kingdom of Hungary. From 1938 to 1945, it was again part of Hungary as a result of the First Vienna Award.

== Geography ==
The municipality lies at an altitude of 232 metres (761 ft) and covers an area of 16.78 km^{2} (6.48 sq mi) (2025).

== Population ==
Population statistic (10 years)
Year	1995	2005	2015	2025
Count	354	340	340	323
Difference		−3.95%	+0%	−5%

Population statistic
Year	2024	2025
Count	331	323
Difference		−2.41%

It has a population of 323 people (31 December 2025).

=== Ethnicity ===
Census 2021 (1+ %)
Ethnicity	Number	Fraction
Hungarian	271	80.89%
Slovak	71	21.19%
Not found out	4	1.19%
Total	335	

In year 2021 was 335 people by ethnicity 271 as Hungarian, 71 as Slovak, 4 as Not found out, 2 as Romani, 1 as Czech and 1 as Polish.

Note on population: The difference values of population numbers in the table "Population statistic" and in the sections "Ethnicity" & "Religion" is caused by the use of various statistical methods.

=== Religion ===
Census 2021 (1+ %)
Religion	Number	Fraction
Calvinist Church	140	41.79%
None	81	24.18%
Roman Catholic Church	76	22.69%
Jehovah's Witnesses	25	7.46%
Greek Catholic Church	5	1.49%
Evangelical Church	4	1.19%
Total	335	

In year 2021 was 335 people by religion 140 from Calvinist Church, 81 from None, 76 from Roman Catholic Church, 25 from Jehovah's Witnesses, 5 from Greek Catholic Church, 4 from Evangelical Church, 3 from Not found out and 1 from United Methodist Church.

== Culture ==
The village has a public library.

== Genealogical resources ==
The records for genealogical research are available at the state archive "Statny Archiv in Kosice, Slovakia"

- Roman Catholic church records (births/marriages/deaths): 1697-1788 (parish B)
- Reformated church records (births/marriages/deaths): 1783-1895 (parish A)

== See also ==
- List of municipalities and towns in Slovakia
