= Krásnohorská Cave =

Cave in Slovakia

Coordinates: 48°46′48″N 19°48′42″E

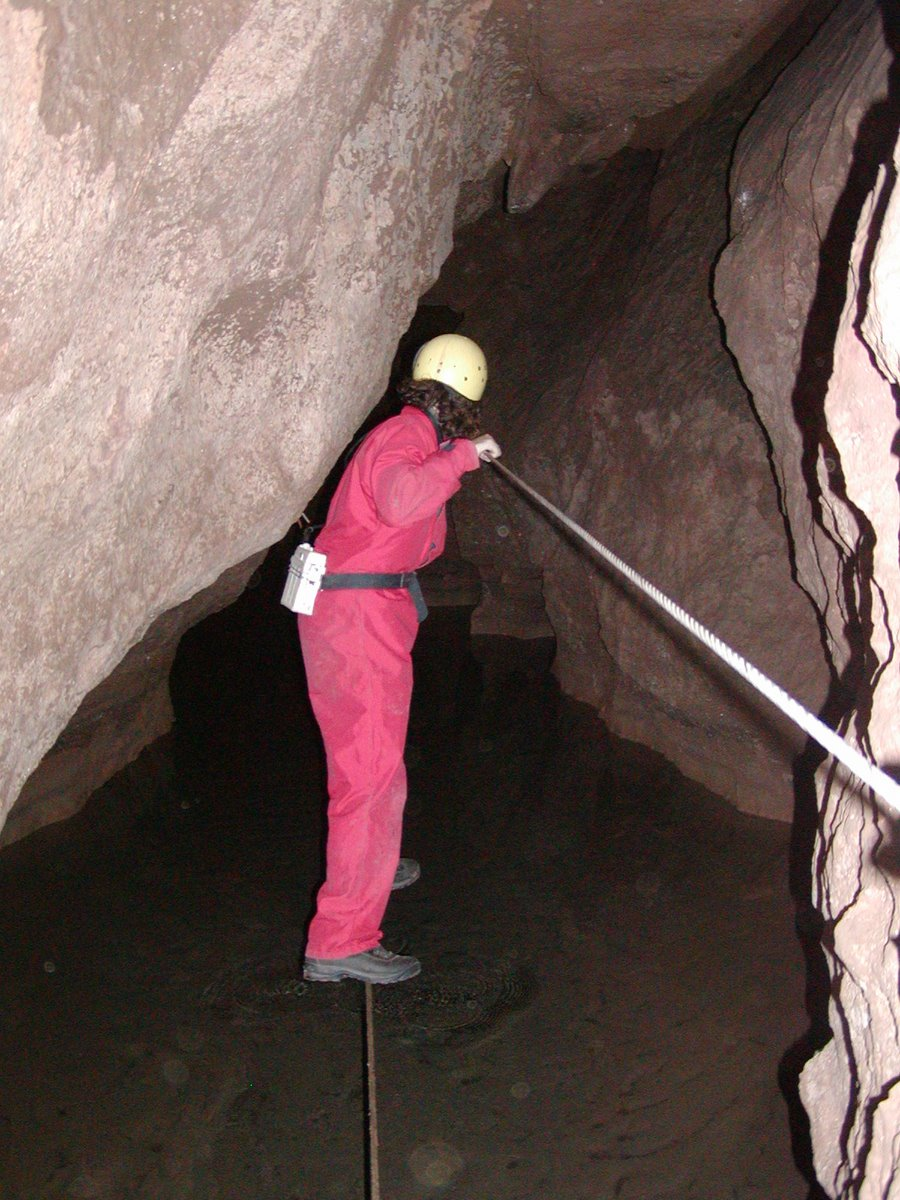
Krásnohorská jaskyňa (2005).jpg

Krásnohorská Cave (Slovak: Krásnohorská Jaskyňa) is a karst cave situated at the northern foot of the Silická planina Plain, in the Slovak Karst, 6.5 km southeast of Rožňava, in Slovakia. With unique natural decorations of bizarre shapes and unusual structure composed almost entirely of calcium, it is currently listed by the Guinness Book of Records as the cave containing the largest stalagmite in existence, generally accepted as being about 12 metres (39 ft) in diameter and 32.7 metres (107 ft) in height. It grows significantly in volume every year as the incessant drips solidify.

The length of the cave is 1,350 metres (4,430 ft) to 1,450 metres (4,760 ft) and it represents the end of the cave system underground stream Buzgó.

== Description ==
Part of the cave from the entrance to the Hall of Giants (Sieň obrov) is formed in dolomite and dolomitic limestones with impressive limestone layers. The back parts of the cave, like the Pearl Passage (Chodba perál), the Great Hall (Veľká sieň), and the Mirror Hall (Zrkadlová sieň), are located in pure limestone areas. The Great Canyon (Veľký kaňon) passageway was formed as a result of tectonic faults which also helped shape large chambers in the back part of the cave, discovered by Rožnava cavers in 1964. Like the other caves in the Slovak Karst zone, it is on the UNESCO List of the World Natural Heritage.

== See also ==
- List of caves in Slovakia
