= Zádielska tiesňava =

National nature reserve in Slovakia

Coordinates: 48.625592°N 20.830936°E

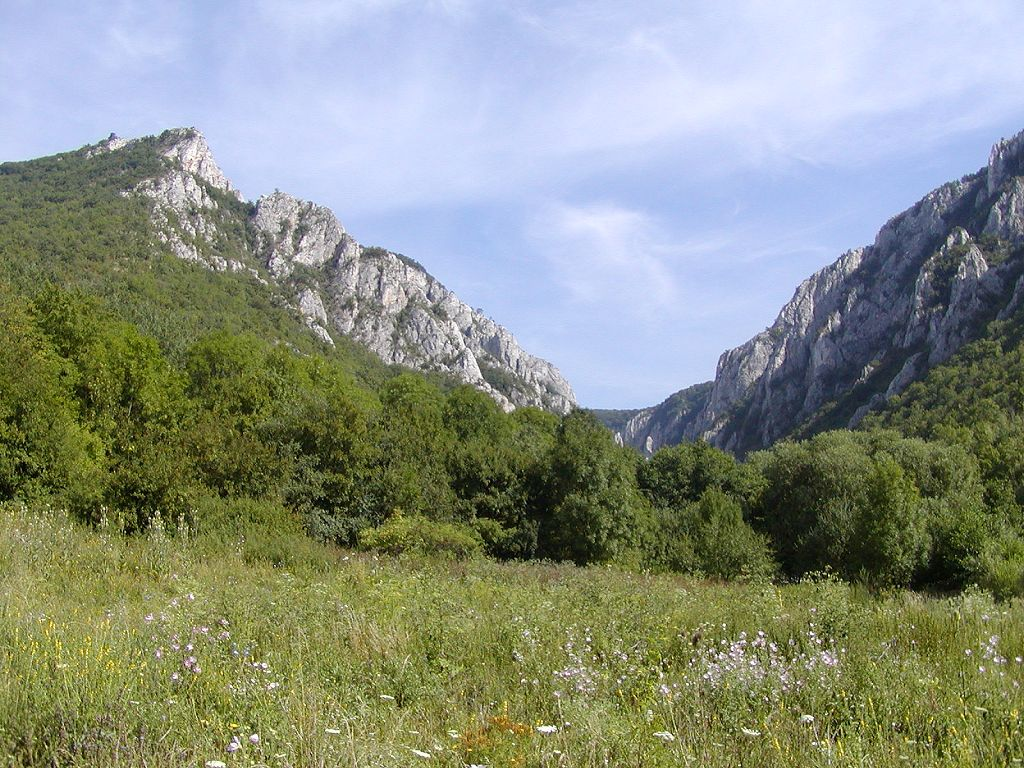
Zádielska tiesňava

Zádielska tiesňava or Zádielska dolina, the Zadiel Canyon, is a mountain pass in the Slovak Karst in Slovakia.

It is known as dolina v krase or valley in the karst. It was created by Chotárny stream. This stream creates small waterfalls. The Zádielska tiesňava was declared a national nature reserve in 1954 for its uniqueness. It is the deepest gorge in Slovakia and is oriented from north to south. At present, we know about 120 caves in the Zádielska tiesňava. The narrowest part of the gorge is a place only 10 m wide, which is called the Zádiel Gate.
