= Ochtinská Aragonite Cave =

Cave in southern Slovakia

Coordinates: 48°39′49.12″N 20°18′20.35″E

- Slovak: Ochtinská aragonitová jaskyňa
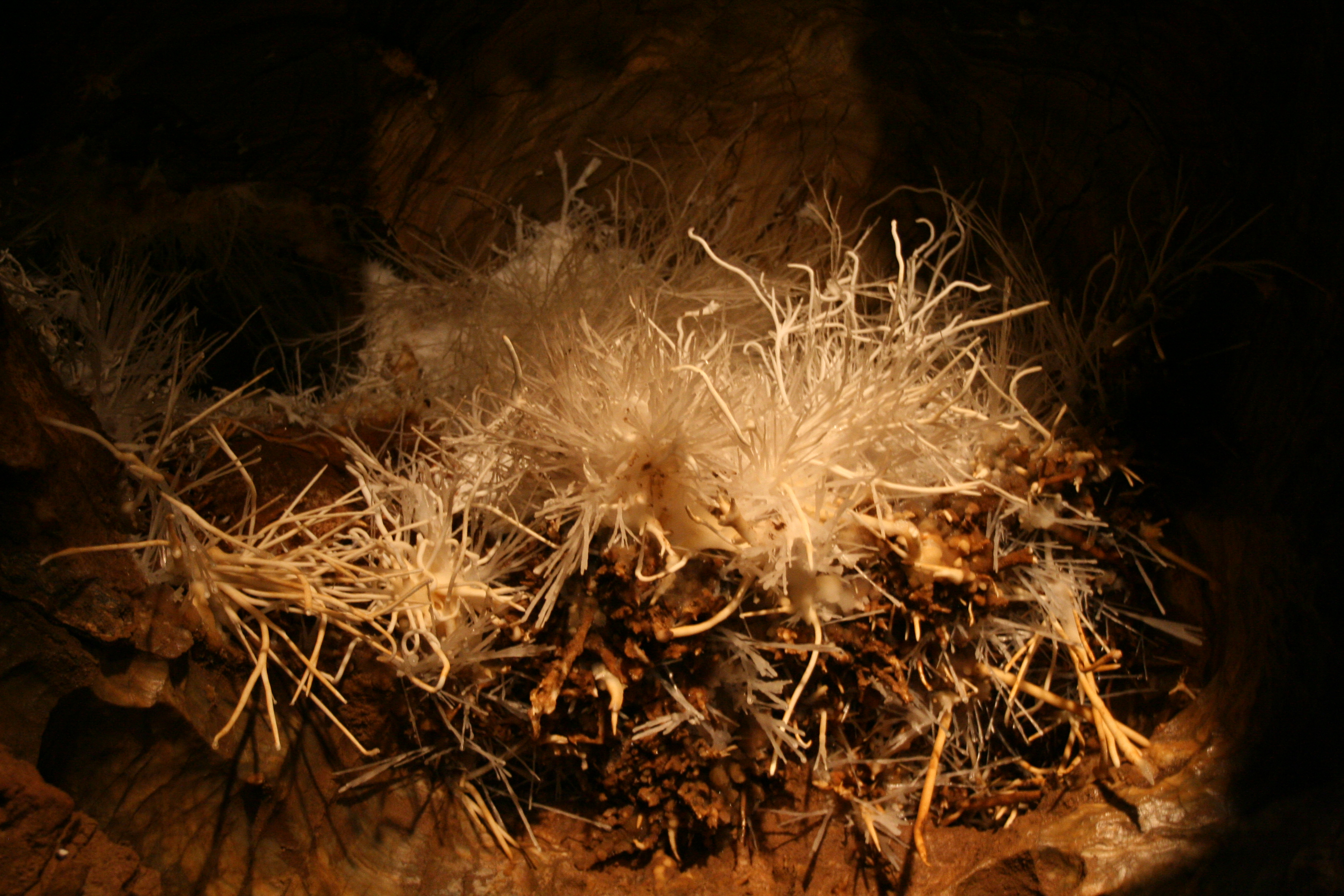
- White aragonite forms the cave's rare attractions
- Interactive map of Ochtinská Aragonite Cave
- Location: Slovak Karst, Slovakia
- Length: 300 m (980 ft)
- Height variation: 30 m
- Elevation: 642 m (2,106 ft)
- Discovery: 1954
- Geology: aragonite
- Visitors: 26,591 (2009)

UNESCO World Heritage Site
- Part of: Caves of Aggtelek Karst and Slovak Karst
- Criteria: Natural: (viii)
- Reference: 725ter
- Inscription: 1995 (19th Session)

Ochtinská Aragonite Cave (Slovak: Ochtinská aragonitová jaskyňa, Hungarian: Martonházi-aragonitbarlang) is a unique aragonite cave situated in southern Slovakia, near Rožňava. Although only 300 m long, it is famous for its rare aragonite formations. Along with other caves of the Slovak Karst, it is included in the UNESCO World Heritage list as a component of Caves of Aggtelek Karst and Slovak Karst site, because of its diversity of aragonite formations and testimony to the cave-forming geologic processes.

== Description ==
The cave is located at 642 meters above sea level, with an temperature between 7.2 and 7.8°C. This stable microclimate, along with dissolved iron, manganese, and magnesium ion is the slowly dripping water, allows for the formation of the ornate aragonite formations. The oldest of these formations are between 120,000 and 130,000 years old, with younger formations being about 14,000 years old.

In the so-called Milky Way Hall, the main attraction of the cave, white branches and clusters of aragonite shine like stars in the Milky Way. The cave was discovered by Martin Cangár and Jiri Prosek in 1954 and opened to the public in 1972.

== See also ==
- List of caves in Slovakia

== Gallery ==
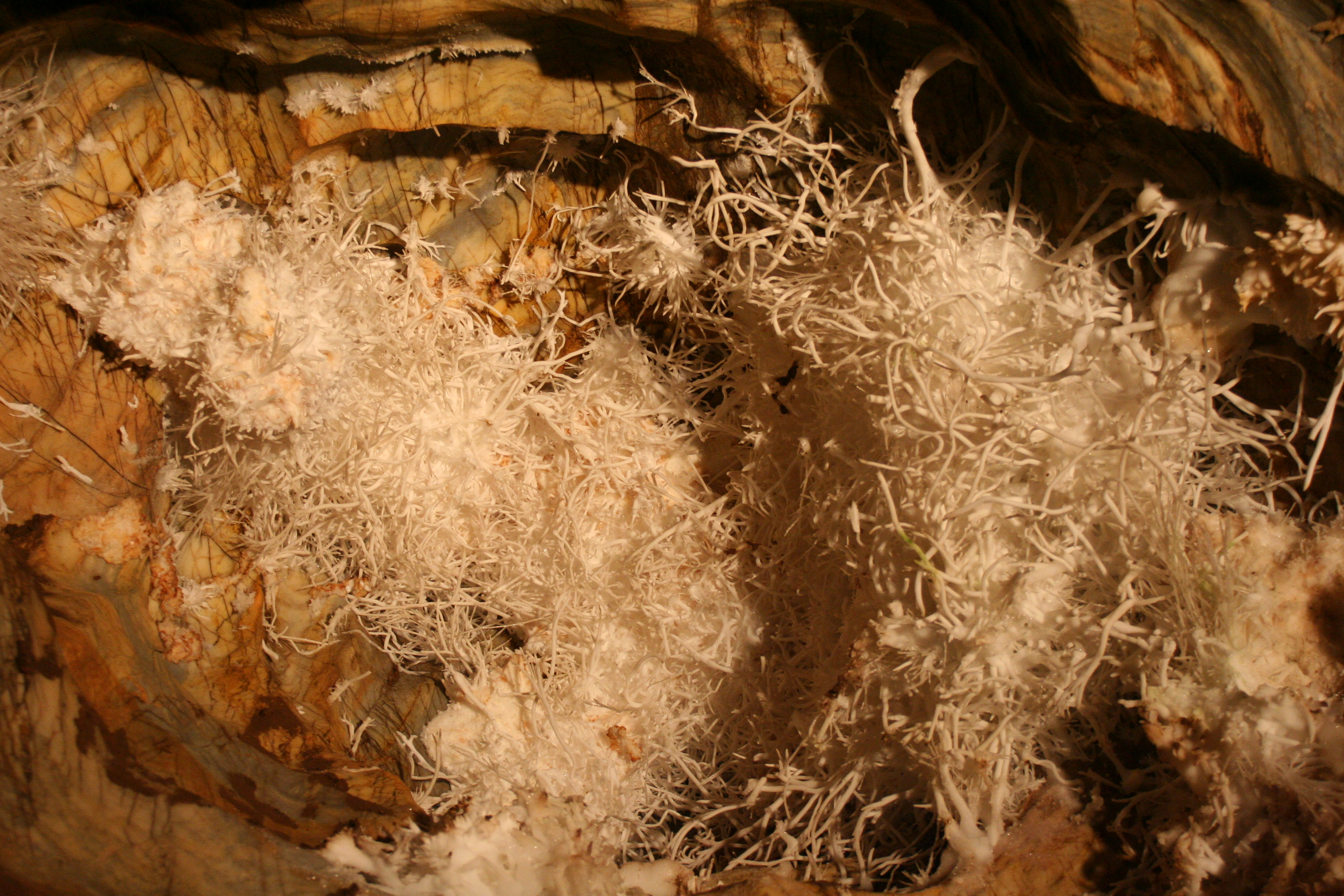
Aragonite inside the cave
