= Silická Plain =

Plain in Slovakia

Silická plain
- Silická planina (Slovak)
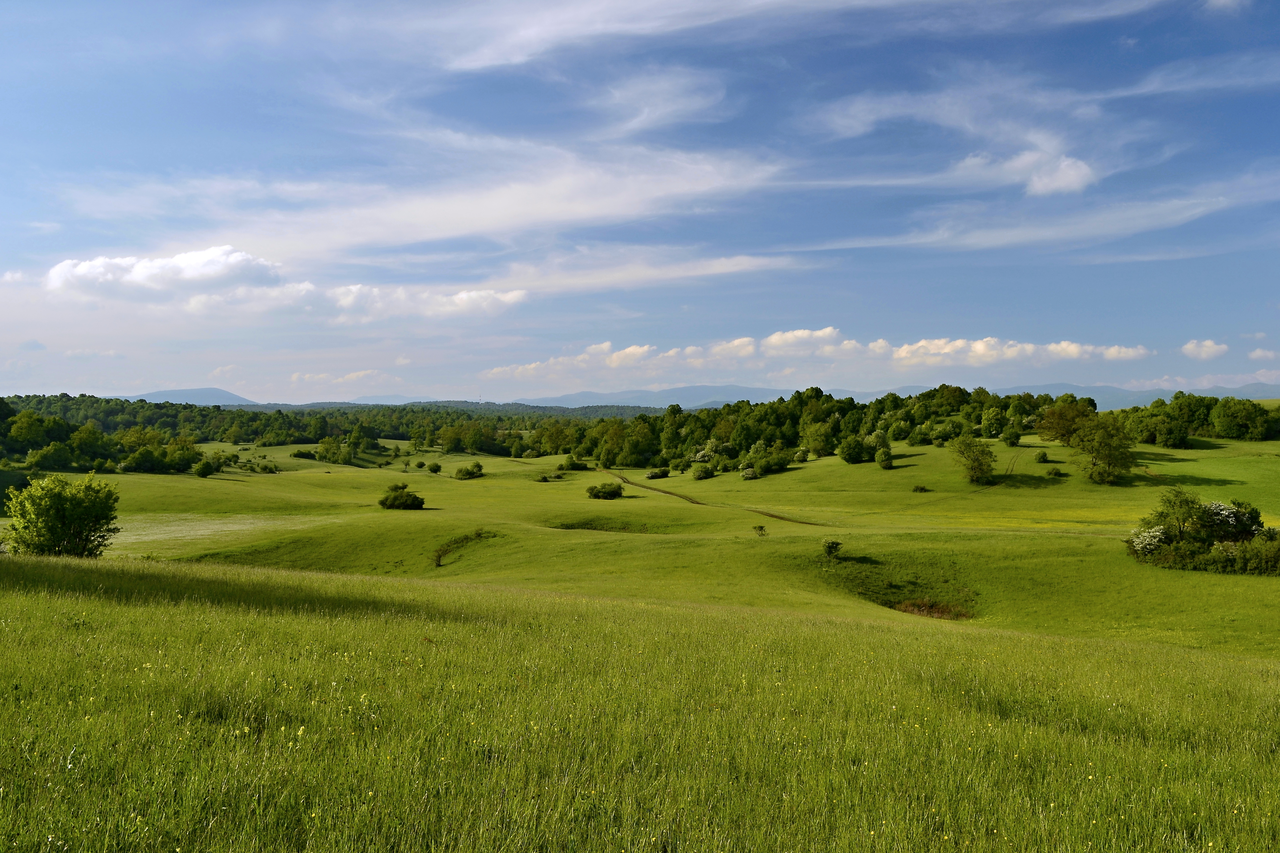
- The plains

- Location within Slovakia
- 48.572°N 20.544°E
- Location: Košice Region, Slovakia

Site notes
- Area: 150 km² (15,000 ha)

The Silická Plain is a geomorphological sub-unit and one of the largest of the plains in the Slovak Karst. It has an area of about 150 km² and extends in its central and southern parts to the border with Hungary.

== Geography ==
The sub-unit occupies the central and southwestern part of the Slovak Karst and within the landscape unit it is delimited in the northwest by the Slana Valley and in the east by the Jablonovske Sedlo. Between them lies the Rožňavská Basin on the northern edge, the Plešivská Planina continues in the northwest and the Rimavská Basin (a sub-unit of the South Slovak Basin) in a short section. The Bodvianska Pahorkatina and its sub-unit Gemerská Pahorkatina adjoin the southwest, the southern edge is delimited by the border with Hungary. The Slovak Karst continues in the eastern direction with the sub-units Dolný vrch, Turnianska Kotlina and Horný vrch.

== Description ==
Its surface is formed by a limestone plateau. In the northern part it reaches a height of up to 679 m above sea level (Malý vrch), in the southern part around 500 m above sea level. The territory of the plain is sharply bordered from the west by the Slana Canyon, from the south by the Rimava Basin, from the north by steep slopes that separate the plain from the Rožňava Basin, and from the more eastern plains the Silická Plain is geomorphologically separated by the Soroška depression (saddle) or the western end of the Turnian Basin. It is separated from the Dolný vrch Plain by a significant fault - the interface of the Werfén rocks (Lower Triassic slates) and Wetterstein limestones protruding to the surface in the area of the Studňa spring near the castle beech. The Silická Plain has created practically all forms of typical karst and partly fluviokarst relief. The height differences between the individual plains are significant, the total height difference of their plateaus is on average 80 – 100 m.

== Structures ==
The Slovak Karst's geological and hydrogeological features are distinctive, with each of its seven plains having unique characteristics. There is little surface runoff, as most precipitation infiltrates the karstified carbonate rocks, forming an underground river network that creates large caves and emerges as springs, such as White Spring and Black Spring. Some springs directly emerge on the plains, especially near certain municipalities. In areas with impermeable clay-shale rocks, such as near Jašterič Lake, wells have been historically important for watering cattle and supporting grazing. Despite recent dry conditions, these wells remain filled with water, with excess water spilling over the area and seeping into the surrounding formations.

== Caves ==
17 caves and 14 chasms have been discovered in the Silická Plain. The Silická ľadnica cave is one of Europe's lowest ice caves, located at 503 meters altitude. Formed by a collapse about 2000 years ago, it is 1100 meters long and 110 meters deep. The cave is inaccessible to the public, but its entrance features a unique microclimate that supports cold-loving mountain flora and fauna, creating an illusion of high-altitude mountain conditions at the entrance.

== Gallery ==
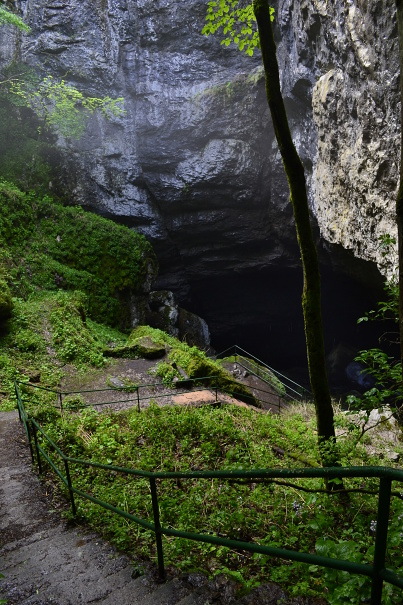
The plains

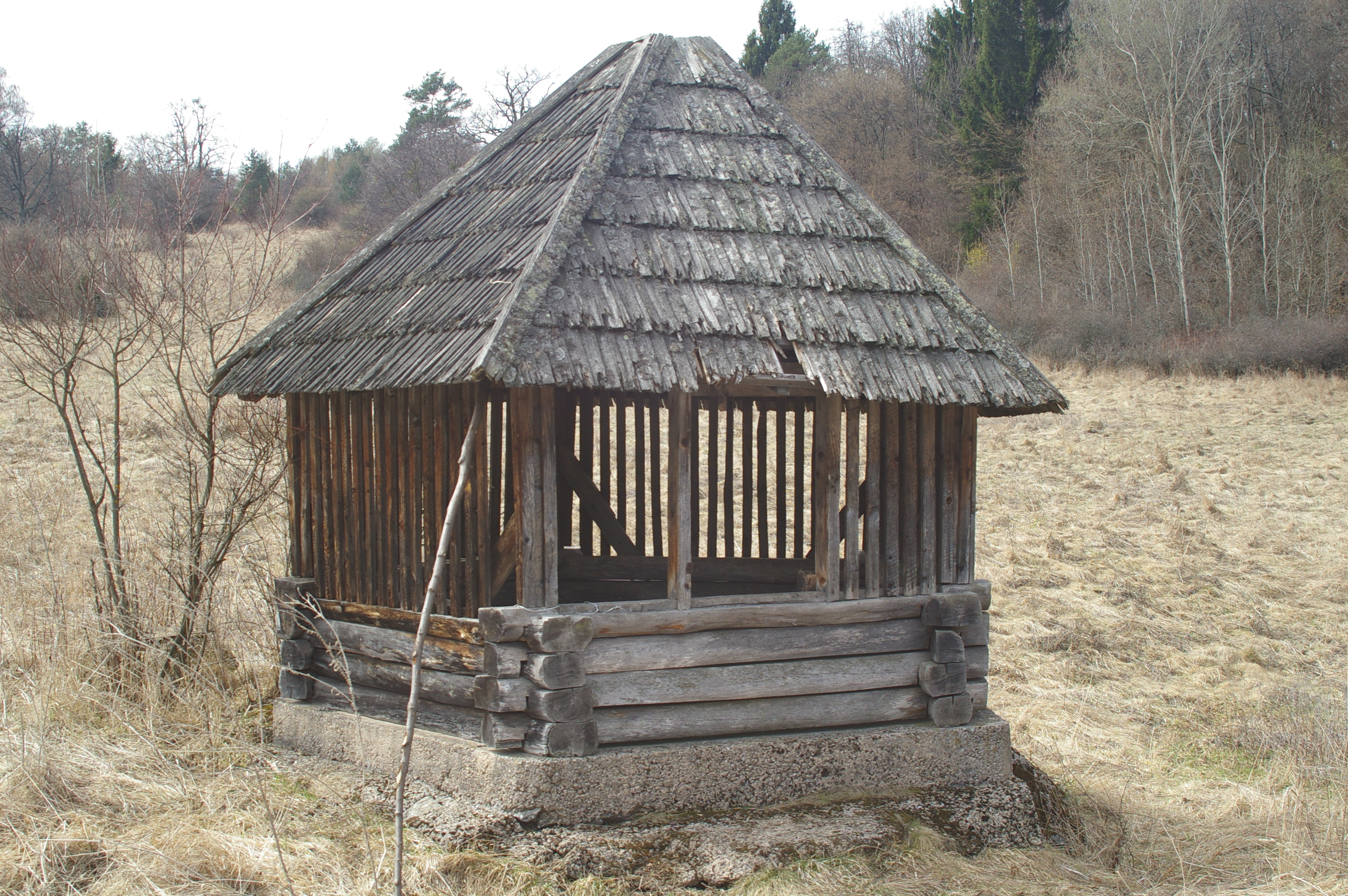
The well in the plains
