= Slovak Karst =

Carpathian geology

Coordinates: 48°35′N 20°35′E

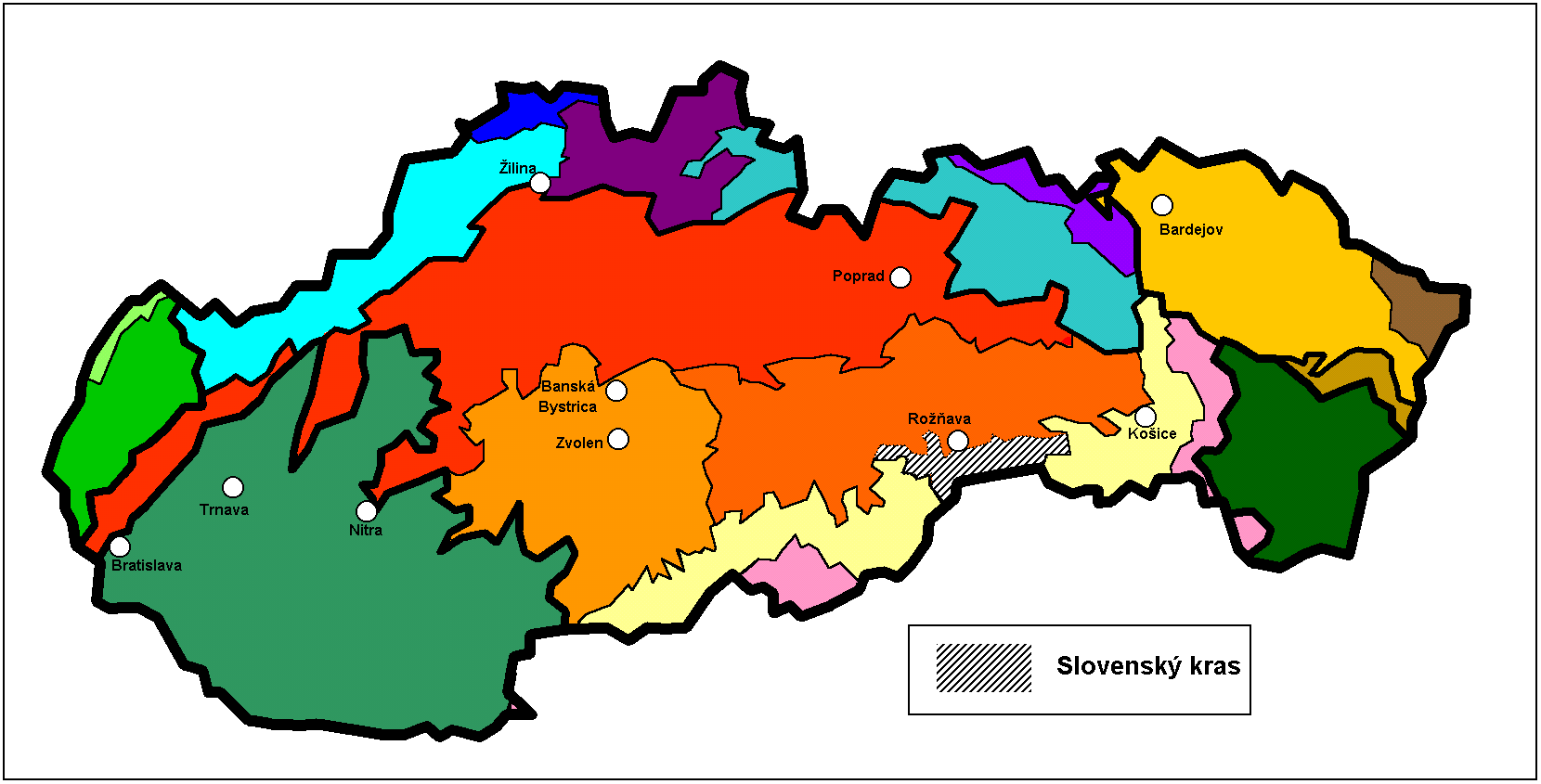
Slovak Karst in Slovakia

The Slovak Karst (Slovak: Slovenský kras) is one of the mountain ranges of the Slovenské Rudohorie mountains in the Carpathians in southern Slovakia. It consists of a complex of huge karst plains and plateaus. Since 1973 it has been a protected landscape area. On 1 March 2002 Slovak Karst National Park was declared. It is also a UNESCO Biosphere Reserve and part of it forms UNESCO World Heritage Site Caves of Aggtelek Karst and Slovak Karst.

== Characteristics ==
The highest peak is Jelení vrch at 947 m AMSL. Important rivers are the Slaná (Sajó), the Štítnik and the Turňa. The Slovak Karst lies in the north temperate zone and has a continental climate with four distinct seasons. The area is composed of several layers of Mesozoic limestone and dolomite, beneath which there is non-permeable sandstone, limestone and slate. The plains are covered by oak-hornbeam forests, the hills by oak forests and the karst pits by spruce forests. Beech forests are in the northern parts.

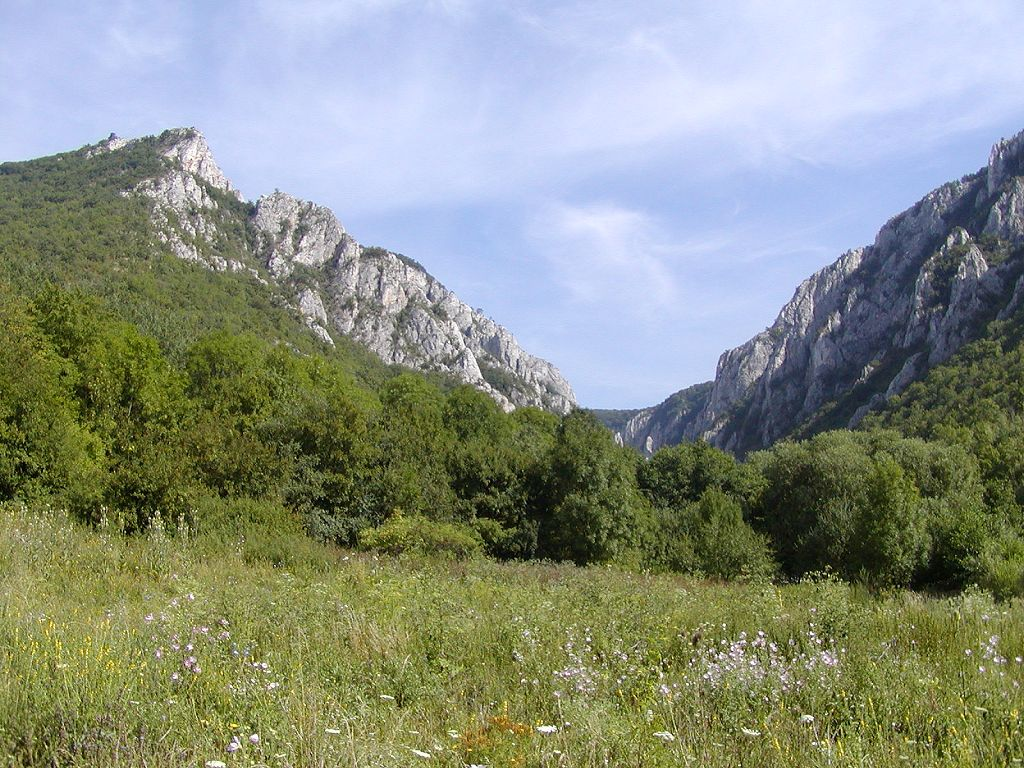
Zádielska tiesňava (Zádiel canyon).

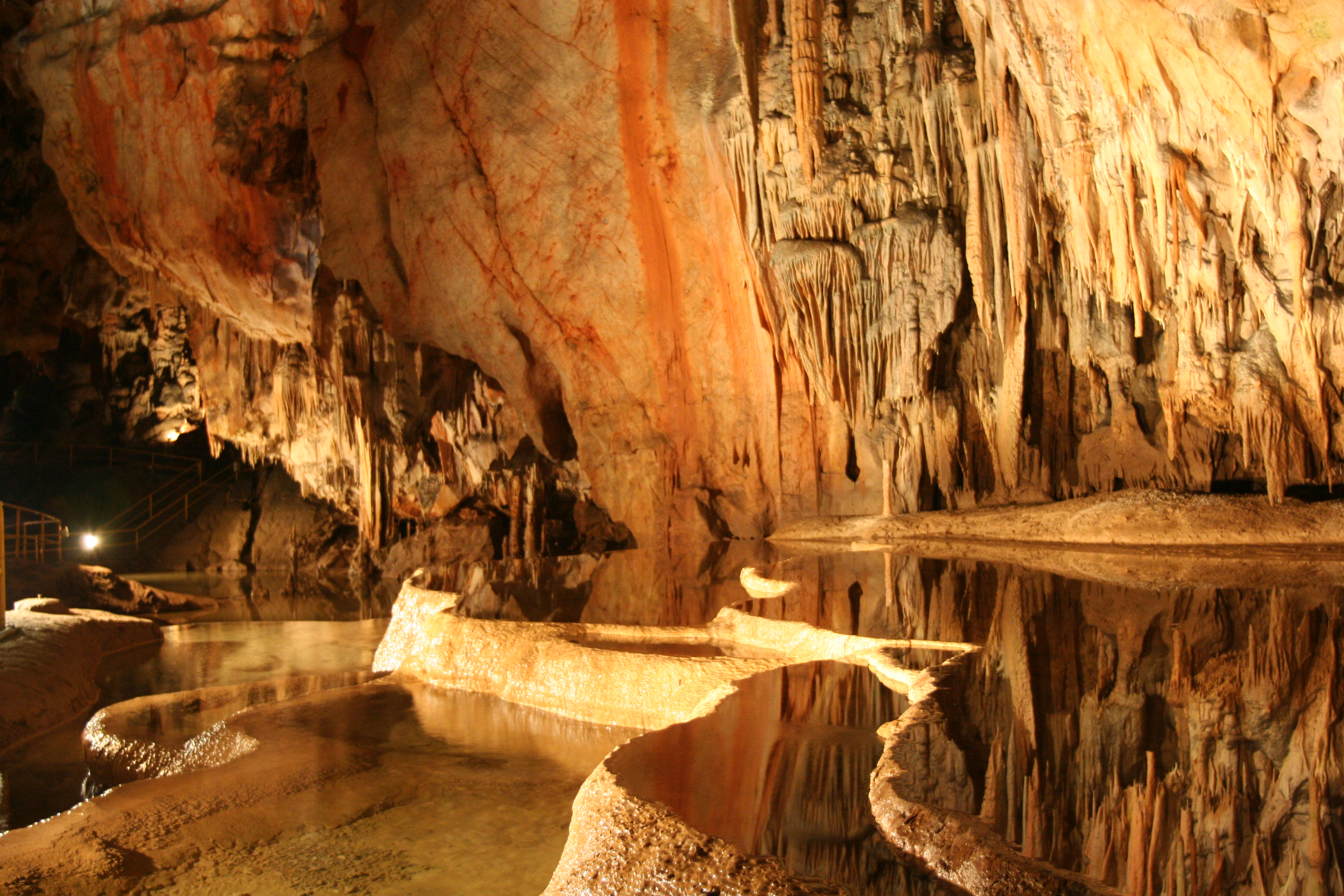
Domica Cave in Slovak Karst (Slovakia.)

The plains (plateaus) have many karst formations, such as karst pits with diameters of up to 250 m and depths of about 45 m, conical hills, blind and half-blind valley and dales. The subterranean karst is known for its deep vertical abysses, such as:

- Čertova diera (literally Devil's Hole; depth: 186 m)
- Brázda (181 m)
- Malá železná priepasť (Little Iron Abyss; 142 m)
- Diviačia priepasť (Boar Abyss; 122 m)

Some of the abysses are collapsed, especially the Silická ľadnica (Silica Ice Abyss; 110 m)

The region is best known for its many caves, out of which the Domica Cave, Ochtinská Aragonite Cave (Ochtinská aragonitová jaskyňa), Gombasek Cave (Gombasecká jaskyňa) and Jasovská Cave (Jasovská jaskyňa) are open to the public. Other noteworthy caves are Krásnohorská Cave (Krásnohorská jaskyňa) and Hrušovská Cave (Hrušovská jaskyňa).

The region also includes karst lakes. The largest lake is Jašteričie jazero (literally Lizard Lake), "Gyükerréti-tó" in Hungarian.

The Slovak Karst also features rare plants, for example:

- Erythronium dens-canis (a relict from the Tertiary period)
- Onosma tornensis (endemic)
- Sesleria heufleriana (endemic)
- Dianthus lumnitzerii (endemic)

and rare animals, for example:

- Eastern imperial eagle (Aquila heliaca)
- Short-toed eagle (Circaetus gallicus)
- Lesser kestrel (Falco naumanni)

== Subdivision ==
Parts (from the west to the east):

- Jelšavský kras (literally Jelšava Karst)
- Koniarska planina (Koniarska Plain)
- Plešivská planina (Plešivská Plain)
- Silická planina (Silická Plain)
- Turnianska planina (Turnianska Plain); see also Turňa
- Horný vrch (Upper Mountain)
- Dolný vrch (Lower Mountain)
- Zádielska planina (Zádielska Plain)
- Jasovská planina (Jasovská Plain)

== See also ==
- Slovak Karst National Park
- Aggtelek National Park
- Caves of Aggtelek Karst and Slovak Karst — a UNESCO World Heritage Site.
