= List of mountains in Poland =

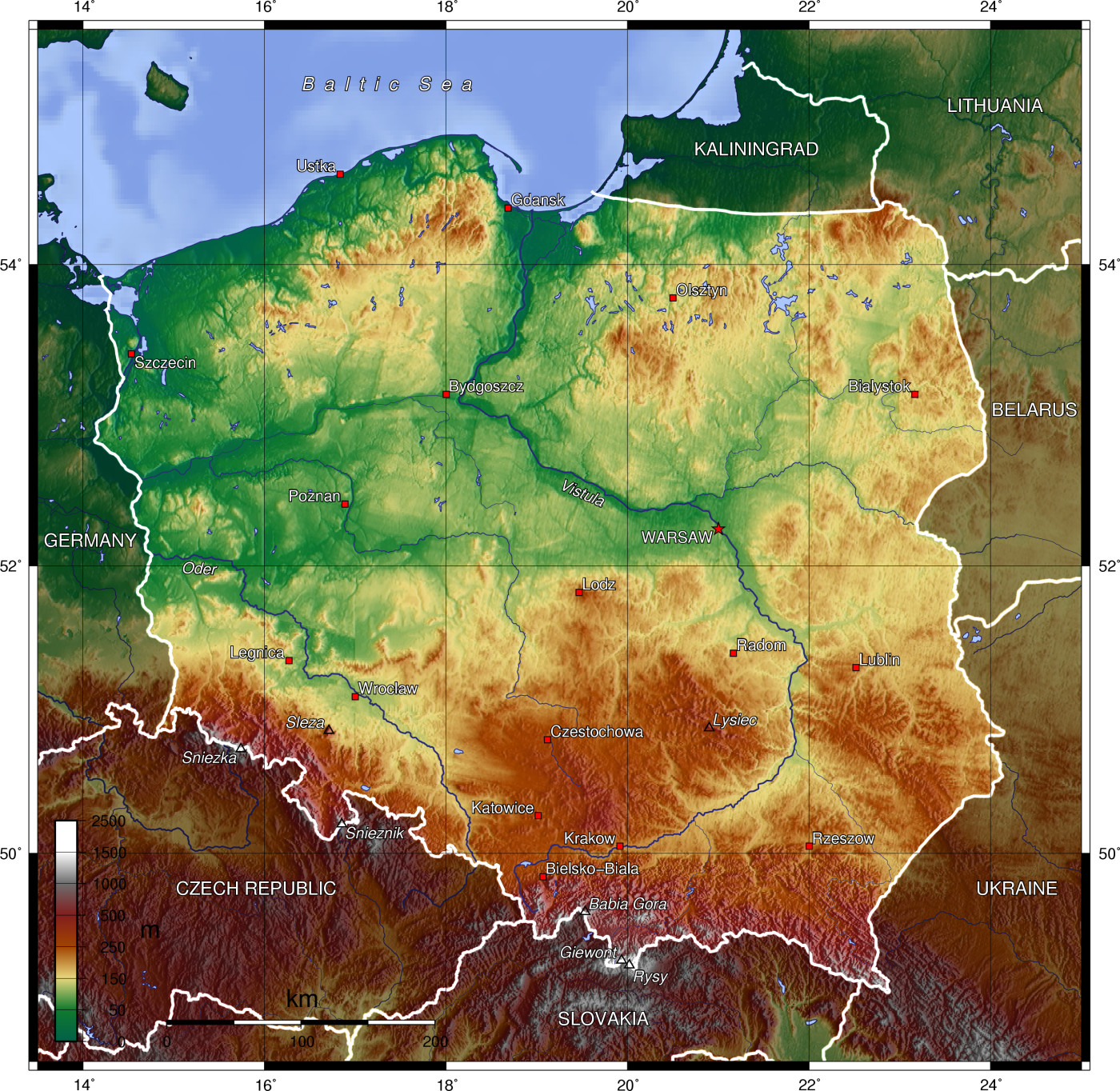

This is a sub-article to Geography of Poland

Two major mountain ranges populate Poland's south-east and south-west borders, respectively: the Sudetes and Carpathian Mountains mountain ranges. Those ranges are located both within and outside of Poland. Within Poland, neither of them is forbidding enough to prevent substantial habitation; the Carpathians are especially densely populated. The rugged form of the Sudeten range derives from the geological shifts that formed the later Carpathian uplift. The Carpathians in Poland, formed as a discrete topographical unit in the relatively recent Tertiary Era, are the highest mountains in the country. They are the northernmost edge of a much larger range that extends into the Czech Republic, Slovakia, Ukraine, Hungary, and Romania.

The Świętokrzyskie Mountains, one of the oldest mountain ranges in Europe, are located in central Poland, in the vicinity of the city of Kielce. The mountain range consists of a number of separate ranges, the highest of which is Łysogóry (lit. bald mountains). Together with the Jura Krakowsko-Częstochowska the mountains form a region called the Lesser Poland Upland (Wyżyna Małopolska). They were formed during the Caledonian orogeny of the Silurian period and then rejuvenated in the Hercynian orogeny of the Upper Carboniferous period.

== Polish mountain ranges ==
- Carpathian Mountains
  - Tatra Mountains
  - Pieniny
  - Silesian Beskids
  - Little Beskids
  - Maków Beskids
  - Żywiec Beskids
  - Island Beskids
  - Gorce Mountains
  - Beskid Sądecki
  - Low Beskids
  - Bieszczady Mountains
    - Otryt
  - Sanocko-Turczańskie Mountains
- Sudetes
  - Giant Mountains
  - Śnieżnik Massif
  - Jizera Mountains
  - Golden Mountains
  - Orlické hory
  - Owl Mountains
  - Bystrzyckie Mountains
  - Rudawy Janowickie
  - Stone Mountains
  - Table Mountains
  - Opawskie Mountains
  - Wałbrzych Mountains
  - Bardzkie Mountains
  - Kaczawskie Mountains
  - Ślęża Massif

== List of mountains ==
Name	Elevation (m/ft)		Mountain Range
Rysy	2,503	8,212	Tatras (Eastern)
Mięguszowiecki Szczyt Wielki	2,438	7,999	Tatras (Eastern)
Niżnie Rysy	2,430	7,970	Tatras (Eastern)
Mięguszowiecki Szczyt Czarny	2,410	7,910	Tatras (Eastern)
Mięguszowiecki Szczyt Pośredni	2,393	7,851	Tatras (Eastern)
Cubryna	2,376	7,795	Tatras (Eastern)
Świnica	2,301	7,549	Tatras (Eastern)
Kozi Wierch	2,291	7,516	Tatras (Eastern)
Zamarła Turnia	2,179	7,149	Tatras (Eastern)
Kościelec	2,155	7,070	Tatras (Eastern)
Mnich	2,068	6,785	Tatras (Eastern)
Starorobociański Wierch	2,176	7,139	Tatras (Western)
Jarząbczy Wierch	2,137	7,011	Tatras (Western)
Kamienista	2,126	6,975	Tatras (Western)
Krzesanica	2,122	6,962	Tatras (Western)
Wołowiec	2,064	6,772	Tatras (Western)
Kasprowy Wierch	1,987	6,519	Tatras (Western)
Giewont	1,894	6,214	Tatras (Western)
Trzy Korony	982	3,222	Pieniny Środkowe
Nowa Góra	902	2,959	Pieniny Środkowe
Flaki	803	2,635	Pieniny Środkowe
Skrzyczne	1,257	4,124	Silesian Beskids
Barania Góra	1,220	4,000	Silesian Beskids
Małe Skrzyczne	1,211	3,973	Silesian Beskids
Wierch Wisełka	1,192	3,911	Silesian Beskids
Równiański Wierch	1,160	3,810	Silesian Beskids
Zielony Kopiec	1,152	3,780	Silesian Beskids
Malinowska Skała	1,152	3,780	Silesian Beskids
Magurka Wiślańska	1,140	3,740	Silesian Beskids
Klimczok	1,117	3,665	Silesian Beskids
Malinów	1,115	3,658	Silesian Beskids
Magura	1,109	3,638	Silesian Beskids
Magurka Radziechowska	1,108	3,635	Silesian Beskids
Trzy Kopce	1,082	3,550	Silesian Beskids
Stołów	1,035	3,396	Silesian Beskids
Glinne	1,034	3,392	Silesian Beskids
Przysłop	1,029	3,376	Silesian Beskids
Szyndzielnia	1,028	3,373	Silesian Beskids
Muronka	1,021	3,350	Silesian Beskids
Jaworzyna	1,020	3,350	Silesian Beskids
Kościelec	1,019	3,343	Silesian Beskids
Czantoria Wielka	995	3,264	Silesian Beskids
Kiczory	990	3,250	Silesian Beskids
Stożek Wielki	978	3,209	Silesian Beskids
Kopa Bukowska	1,320	4,330	Bieszczady Mountains
Tokarnia	778	2,552	Low Beskids

== See also ==
- Crown of Polish Mountains
