= Tatra Mountains =

Mountain range on the Polish–Slovak border

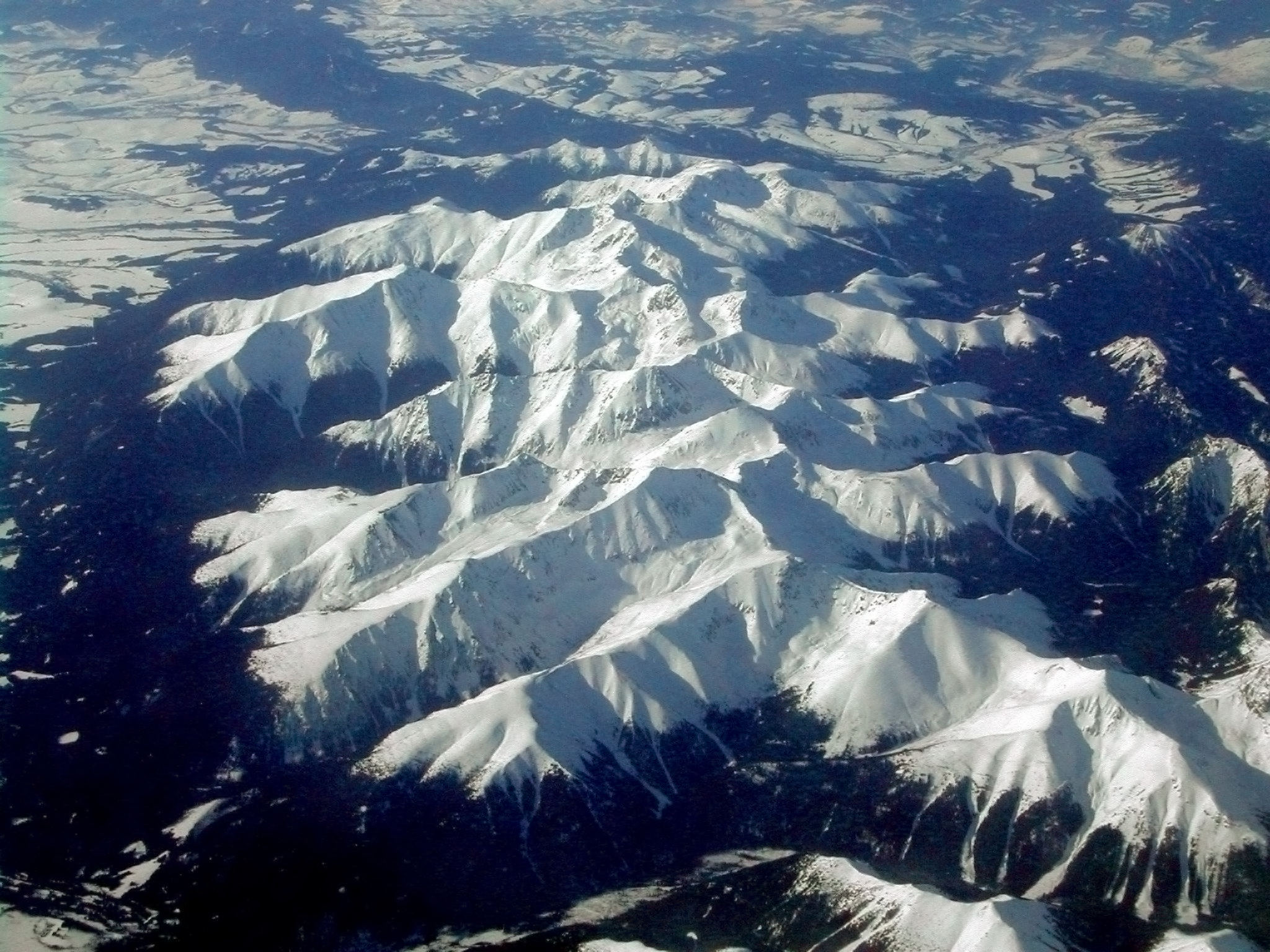
- Bird's-eye view of Western Tatras

Highest point
- Peak: Gerlachovský štít
- Elevation: 2,655 m (8,711 ft)

Geography
- Countries: Slovakia; Poland
- Range coordinates: 49°12′02″N 19°58′26″E
- Parent range: Western Carpathians

Location in Europe

The Tatra Mountains (pronounced) or Tatras (Note: (Tatry either in Slovak (pronounced [ˈtatri]) or in Polish (pronounced [ˈtatrɨ]) – plurale tantum)) are located within the Western Carpathians that form a natural border between Slovakia and Poland. They are the highest mountains in the Carpathians. The Tatras are distinct from the Low Tatras (Slovak: Nízke Tatry), a separate Slovak mountain range further south.

The Tatra Mountains occupy an area of 785 square kilometres (303 sq mi), of which about 610 square kilometres (236 sq mi) (77.7%) lie within Slovakia and about 175 square kilometres (68 sq mi) (22.3%) within Poland. The highest peak, called Gerlachovský štít, at 2,655 metres (8,711 feet), is located north of Poprad, entirely in Slovakia. The highest point in Poland, Rysy, at 2,500 metres (8,200 ft), is located southeast of Zakopane, on the border with Slovakia.

The Tatras' length, measured from the eastern foothills of the Kobylí vrch (1,109 metres (3,638 ft)) to the southwestern foot of Ostrý vrch (1128 m), in a straight line, is 57 km (35 mi), and strictly along the main ridge, 80 km (50 mi). The range is only 19 km (12 mi) wide. The main ridge of the Tatras runs from the village of Huty at the western end to the village of Ždiar at the eastern end.

The Tatras are now protected by law by the establishment of the Tatra National Park, Slovakia and the Tatra National Park, Poland, which are jointly entered in UNESCO's World Network of Biosphere Reserves. In 1992, UNESCO jointly designated the Polish and Slovak parks a transboundary biosphere reserve in the World Network of Biosphere Reserves, under its Man and the Biosphere Programme.

== Etymology ==
The first written record of the name is from 999, when the Bohemian Duke Boleslaus II, on his deathbed, recalled when the Duchy of Bohemia extended to the Tritri montes. Another mention is in the 1086 document from Henry IV, wherein he referred to the Diocese of Prague with Tritri mountains. Still another is in 1125, where the Kosmas chronicles (Chronica Boemorum) mention the name Tatri.

In 1790 Belsazar Hacquet wrote that Slavs call these mountains Tatari or Tatri because there used to be Tatar hordes roaming the area.

Machek in 1931 favored the theory of the Polish linguist Rozwadowski with a syllabic r like in the words chrt (Czech hound), smrt (Czech death). In Czech this syllabic is sometimes with vowels i, e or u for example črný – černý, so the Czech reconstruction from Tritri/Tritry would be Trtry. In Polish, the term Tatry is firstly mentioned in 1255. Syllabic r often has vowels on both sides in Polish, so in the case of Tarty, we can reconstruct the name to Tartry, where the vowel a originated before the syllabic r, which dissimilated. This theory is supported by Hungarian forms Turtur, Turtul, and Tortol from the 12th to 14th centuries. It is unclear what form the Slovak term took before the 17th century when the first references to Tatry appear, probably as a loan word from Polish that later found its way into Czech and Hungarian. The term Tatra also appears as a general term in Slovak for barren or stony land, and in Ukraine, for small stones in a river, toltry. Machek stresses that the name has no Slavic origin and mentions Rozwadowski's theory of an Illyrian origin because of a connection with a Herzegovian highland called Tatra, thus taken from local inhabitants.

== Overview ==
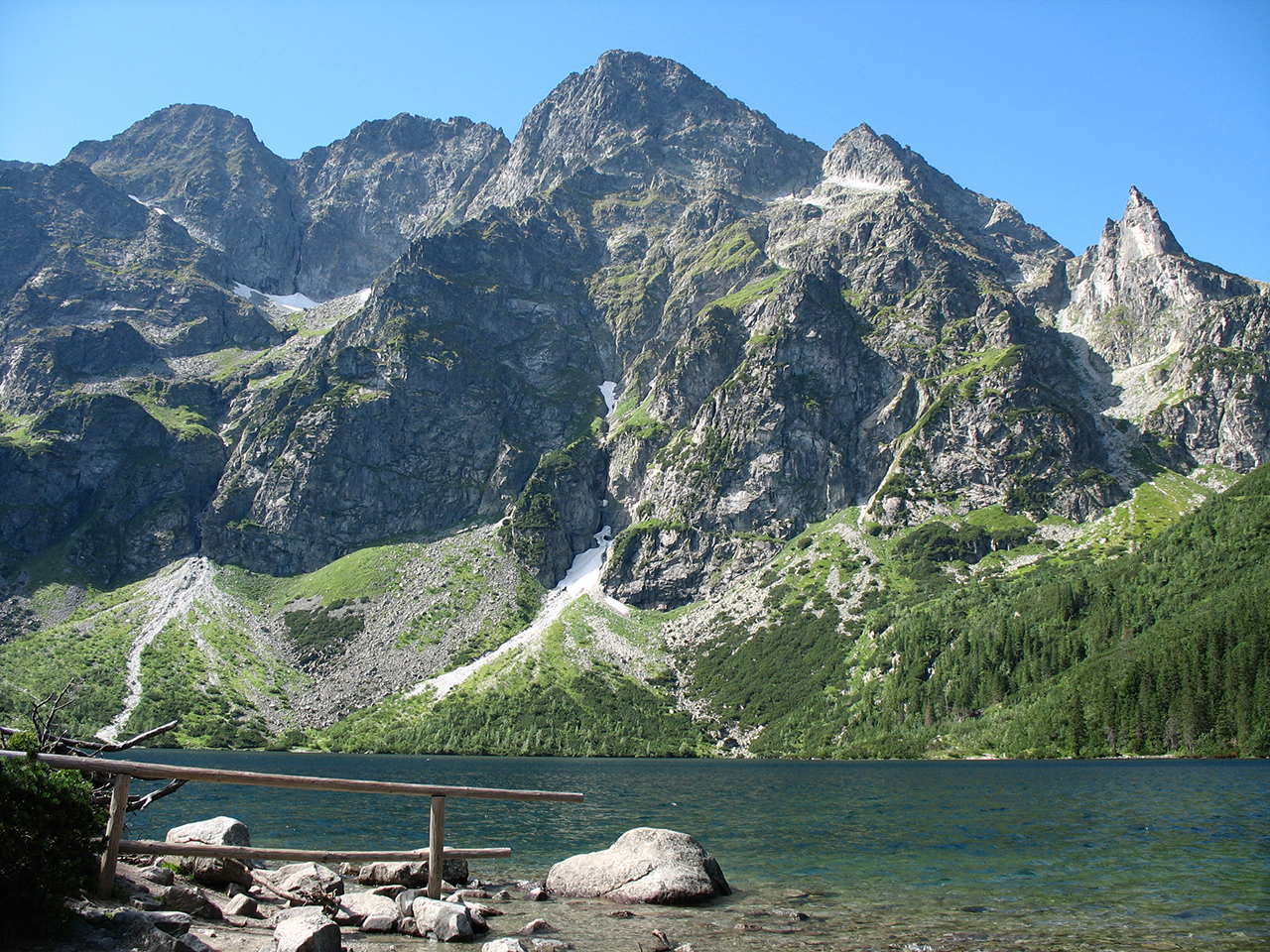
Eye of the Sea, Mięguszowiecki Summits, Cubryna, Mnich

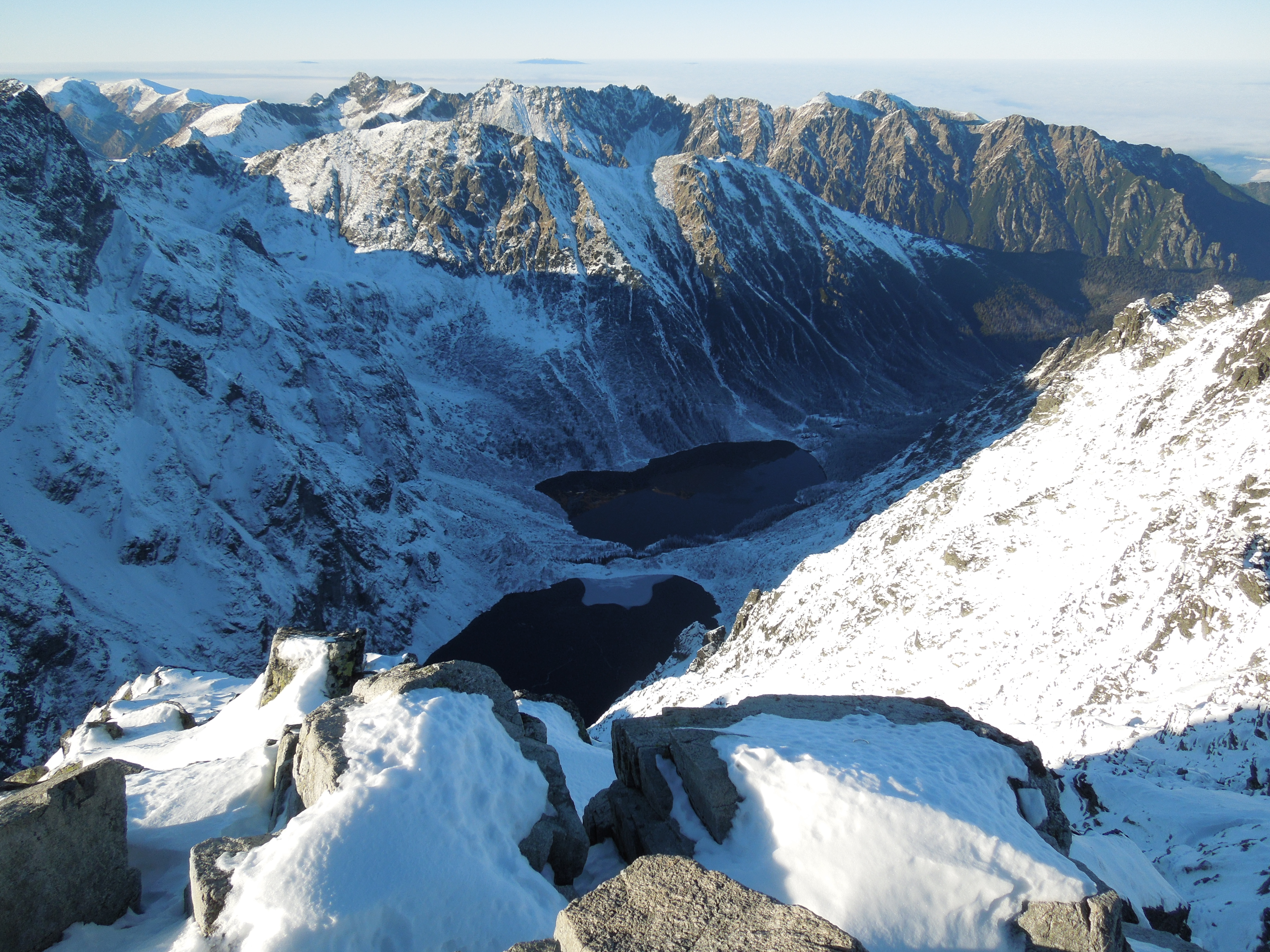
Mountain lakes of Czarny Staw pod Rysami and Morskie Oko seen from Poland's highest point, the north-western summit of Rysy, 2,500 metres (8,202 ft) in elevation.

The Tatras are a mountain range of a corrugated nature, originating from the Alpine orogeny, and therefore characterized by a relatively young-looking lie of the land, quite similar to the landscape of the Alps, although significantly smaller. It is the highest mountain range within the Carpathians.

It consists of the internal mountain chains of:

- Eastern Tatras (Východné Tatry, Tatry Wschodnie), which in turn consist of:
  - the Belianske Tatras (Belianske Tatry, Tatry Bielskie)
  - and the High Tatras (Vysoké Tatry, Tatry Wysokie)
- Western Tatras (Slovak: Západné Tatry, Polish: Tatry Zachodnie)

The overall nature of the Tatras, together with their easy accessibility, makes them a favorite with tourists and researchers. Therefore, these mountains are a popular winter sports area, with resorts such as Poprad and the town Vysoké Tatry (The Town of High Tatras) in Slovakia created in 1999, including former separate resorts: Štrbské Pleso, Starý Smokovec, and Tatranská Lomnica or Zakopane, called also "winter capital of Poland". The High Tatras, with their 24 (or 25) peaks exceeding 2,500 m above sea level, together with the Southern Carpathians, represent the only form of alpine landscape in the entire 1,200 kilometres (746 miles) length of arc of the Carpathians.

== Ownership and border disputes ==
By the end of the First Polish Republic, the border with the Kingdom of Hungary in the Tatras was not exactly defined. The Tatras became an unoccupied borderland. On 20 November 1770, under the guise of protection against the epidemic of plague in the Podolia, an Austrian army entered into Polish land and formed a cordon sanitaire, seizing Sądecczyzna, Spiš and Podhale. Two years later, the First Partition of Poland allocated the lands to Austria. In 1824, Zakopane region and the area around Morskie Oko were purchased from the authorities of the Austrian Empire by a Hungarian, Emanuel Homolacs. When Austria-Hungary was formed in 1867, the Tatra Mountains became a natural border between the two states of the dual monarchy, but the border itself has not been exactly determined. In 1889, a Polish Count Władysław Zamoyski purchased at auction the Zakopane region along with the area around Morskie Oko. Due to numerous disputes over land ownership in the late 19th century, attempts were made at the delimitation of the border. They were fruitless until 1897, and the case went to an international court, which determined on 13 September 1902 the exact course of the Austro-Hungarian border in the disputed area.

A new round of border disputes between Poland and Czechoslovakia started immediately after the end of the First World War, when these two countries were established. Among other claims, Poland claimed ownership of a large part of the Spiš region. This claim also included additional parts of the Tatra Mountains. After several years of border conflicts, the first treaty (facilitated by the League of Nations) was signed in 1925, with Poland receiving a small northernmost part of the Spiš region, immediately outside (to the north-east of) the Tatra Mountains, thus not changing the border in the mountains themselves. During the Second World War there were multiple attempts by both sides of the conflict to occupy more land, but the final treaty signed in 1958 (valid until the present day) preserved the border line agreed in 1925.

=== Borders and hiking ===
With the collapse of the Austrian Empire in 1918 and the creation of Poland and Czechoslovakia, the Tatra Mountains started to be divided by the international border. This brought considerable difficulties to hikers, as it was illegal to cross the border without passing through an official border checkpoint, and for many decades, there were no checkpoints for hikers anywhere on the border ridge. The nearest road border crossings were Tatranská Javorina - Łysa Polana and Podspády - Jurgów in the east, and Suchá Hora - Chocholów in the west. Indeed, those who did cross elsewhere were frequently fined or even detained by the border police of both countries. On the other hand, the permeable border in the Tatra Mountains was also heavily used for cross-border smuggling of goods such as alcohol, tobacco, coffee, etc. between Poland and Czechoslovakia. Only in 1999, more than 80 years after the dissolution of the Austrian Empire, the governments of Poland and Slovakia signed an agreement designating several unstaffed border crossings (with only irregular spot checks by border police) for hikers and cyclists on the 541 km-long Slovak-Polish border. One of these border crossings was created in the Tatra Mountains themselves, on the summit of the Rysy peak. However, there were still many other peaks and passes where hiking trails ran across the border, but where crossing remained illegal. This situation finally improved in 2007, with both countries accessing the Schengen Area. Since then, it has been legal to cross the border at any point (i.e., no further official checkpoints were designated). Rules of the national parks on both sides of the border still apply, and they restrict movement to official hiking trails and (especially on the Slovak side) mandate extensive seasonal closures to protect wildlife.

== Climate ==
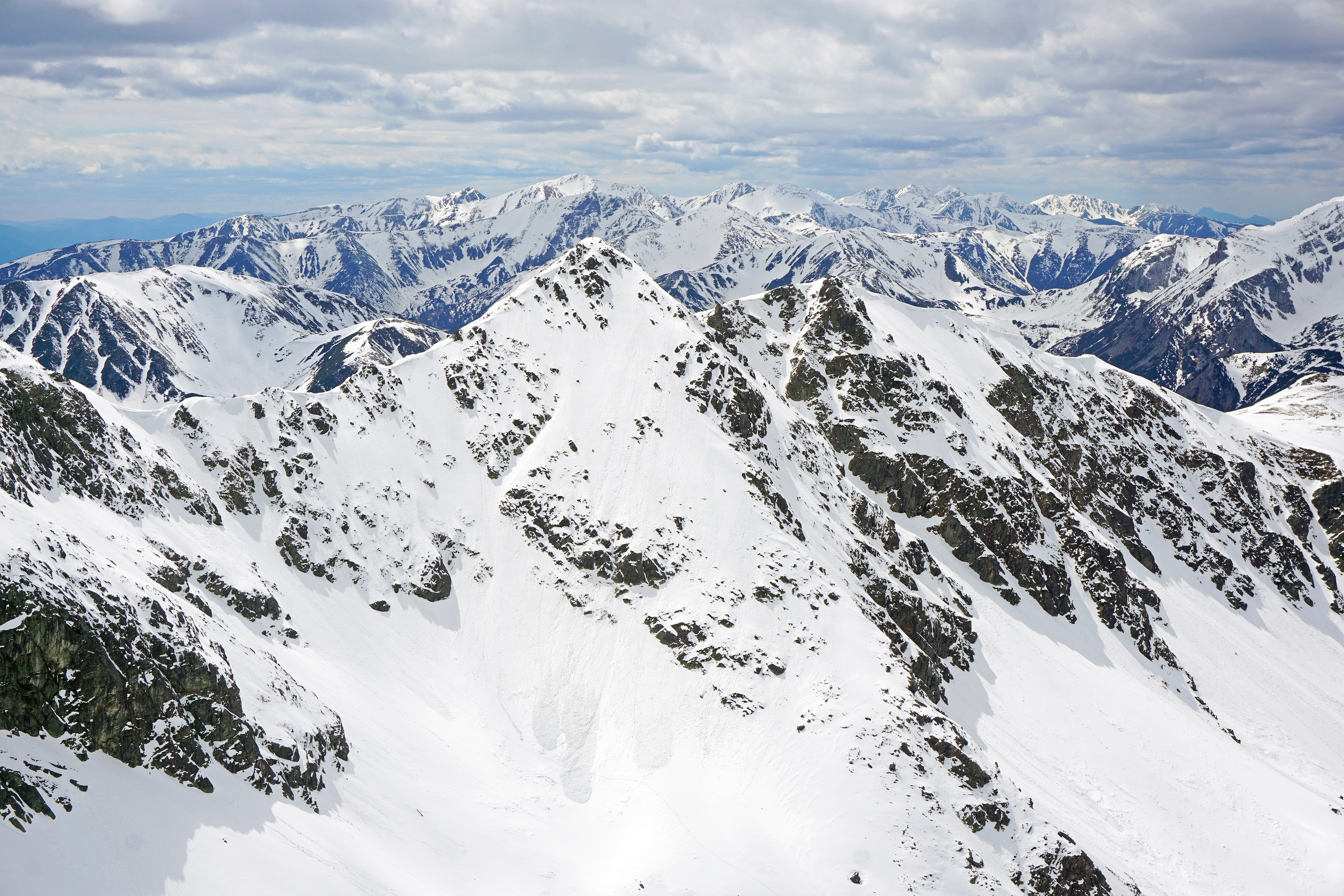
Snow covered Tatras in May 2019.

The Tatras lie in the temperate zone of Central Europe. They are an important barrier to the movements of air masses. Their mountainous topography causes one of the most diverse climates in that region.

=== Precipitation ===
The highest precipitation figures are recorded on the northern slopes. In June and July, monthly precipitation reaches around 250 mm (10 in). Precipitation occurs from 215 to 228 days a year. Thunderstorms occur 36 days a year on average.

=== Snow cover ===
Maximum snow cover on the summit amounts to:

- in Poland - Kasprowy Wierch: maximum 388 cm (153 in)
- in Slovakia - Lomnický Štít: mean maximum of 204 cm (80 in)

Peaks are sometimes covered with snow or ice throughout the year. Avalanches are frequent.

=== Temperature ===
Czerwone Wierchy

Extreme temperatures range from −40 °C (−40 °F) in the winter to 33 °C (91 °F) in warmer months. Temperatures also vary depending on the altitude and sun exposure of a given slope. Temperatures below 0 °C (32 °F) last for 192 days on the summits.

Litworowy Kocioł, located on the northern side of the Czerwone Wierchy, is Poland’s "pole of cold". On July 18, 2022, a temperature of –5.7 °C was recorded there, the lowest ever for that month. On February 17, 2025, a temperature of –41.13 °C was recorded, marking the lowest temperature in the history of meteorological measurements in Poland.

=== Winds ===
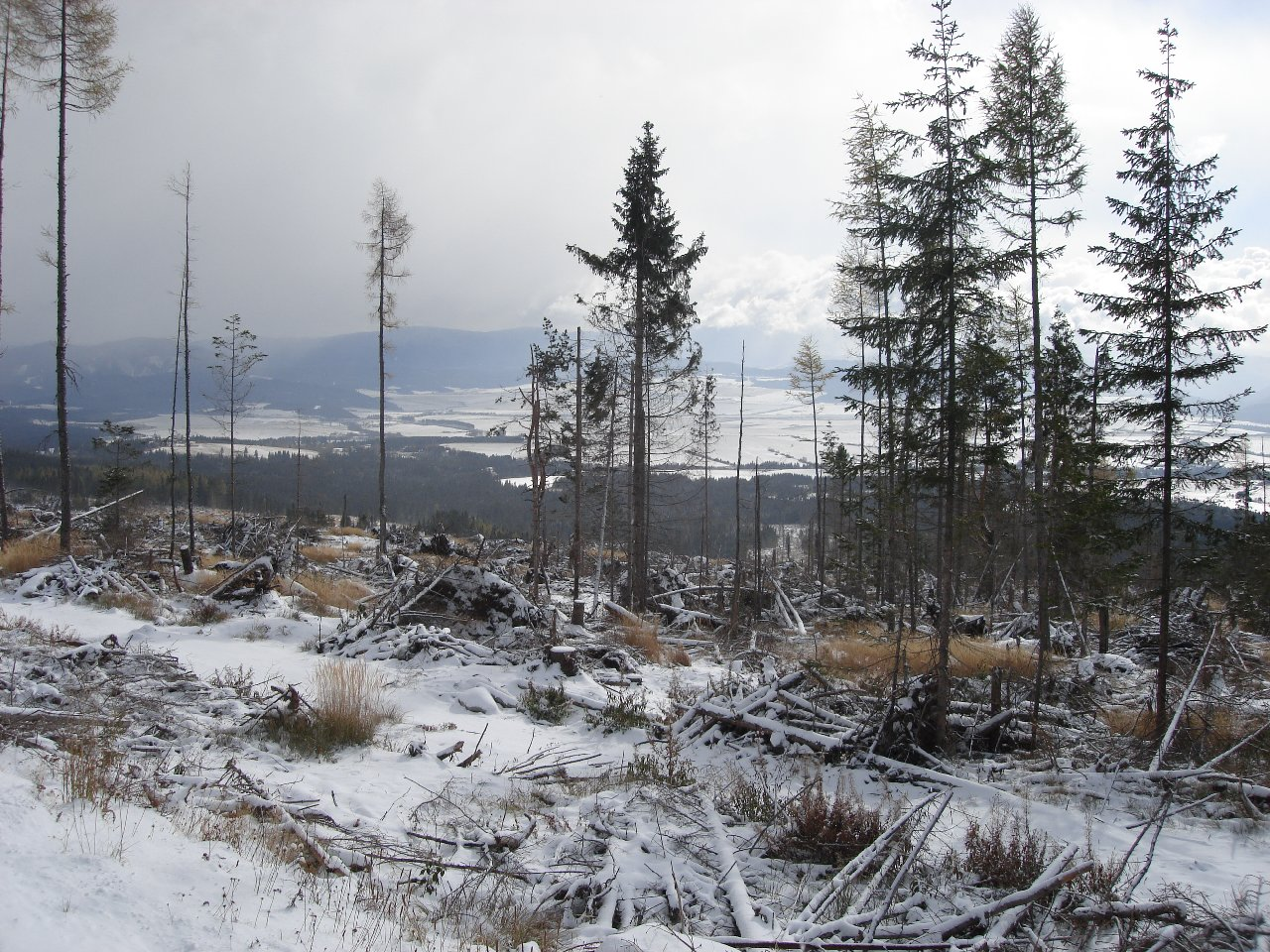
Visible effects of the 2004 storm in Slovakia

The average wind speed on the summits is 6 m/s (13.4 mi/hr).

- southerly winds on the northern side
- westerly winds at the base of Tatra (Orava-Nowy Targ Basin)
- foehn winds (Polish: halny) most often occur between October and May. They are warm and dry and can cause extensive damage.
- Maximum wind speed 288 km/h (179 mph) (6 May 1968).

On 19 November 2004, large parts of the forests in the southern Slovak part of the High Tatras were damaged by a strong wind storm. Three million cubic metres (1,864 square miles) of trees were uprooted, two people died, and several villages were totally cut off. Further damage was done by a subsequent forest fire, and it will take many years until the local ecology is fully recovered.

== Flora ==
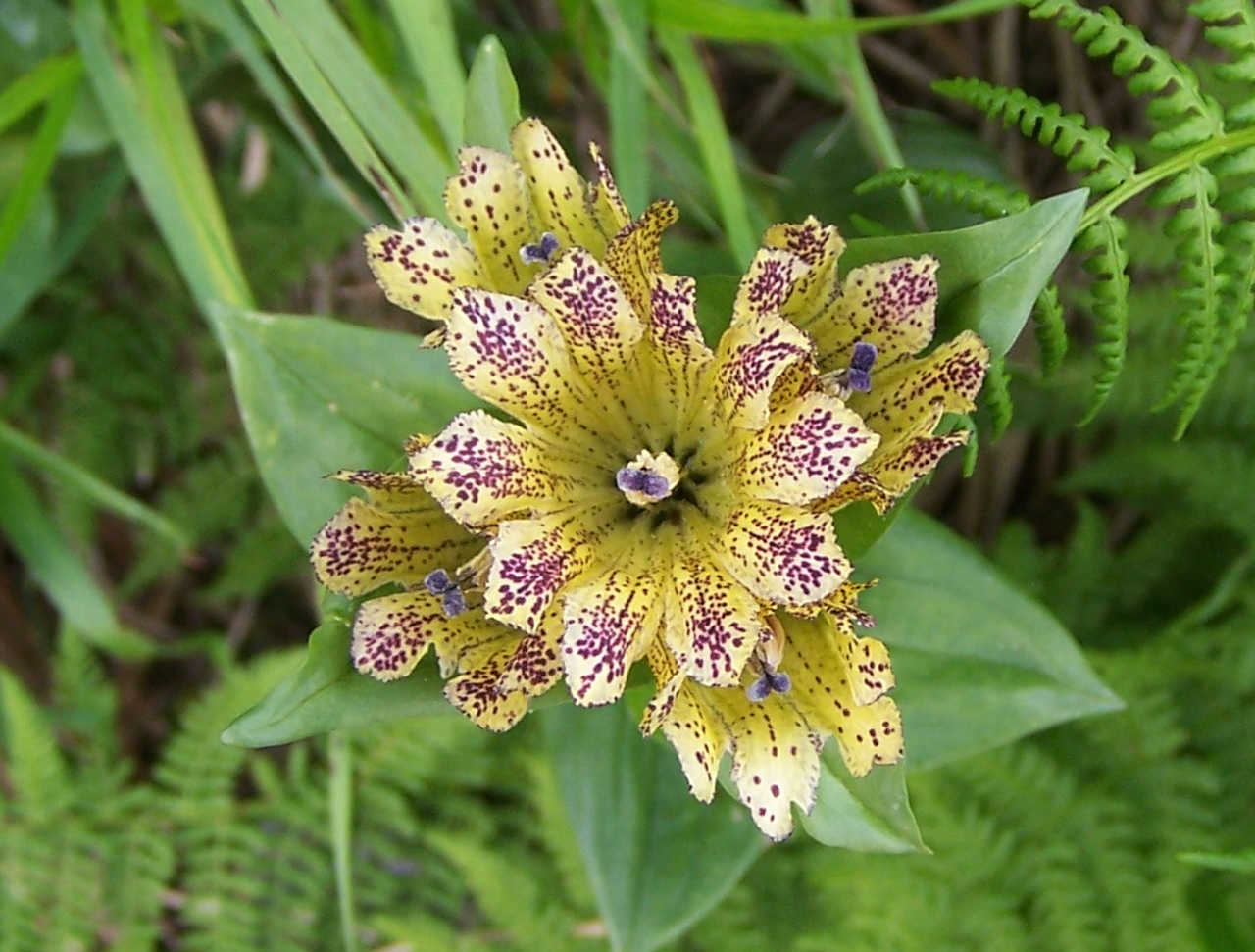
Gentiana punctata

The Tatra Mountains have a diverse variety of plant life. Many of the plant species are also found in the Alps. They are home to more than 1,000 species of vascular plants, about 450 mosses, 200 liverworts, 700 lichens, 900 fungi, and 70 slime moulds. There are five climatic-vegetation belts in the Tatras.

The distribution of plants depends on altitude:

- up to 1,300 metres (4,300 feet): Carpathian beech forest; almost no shrub layer, herbaceous layer occupies most of the forest floor
- to 1,550 metres (5,090 feet): Spruce forest; shrub layer poorly developed, mosses are a major component
- to 1,800 metres (5,900 feet): Mountain Pine, numerous herbs
- to 2,300 metres (7,500 feet): high altitude grasslands
- from 2,300 metres (7,500 feet) up: Subnivean - bare rock and almost no vegetation (mostly lichens)

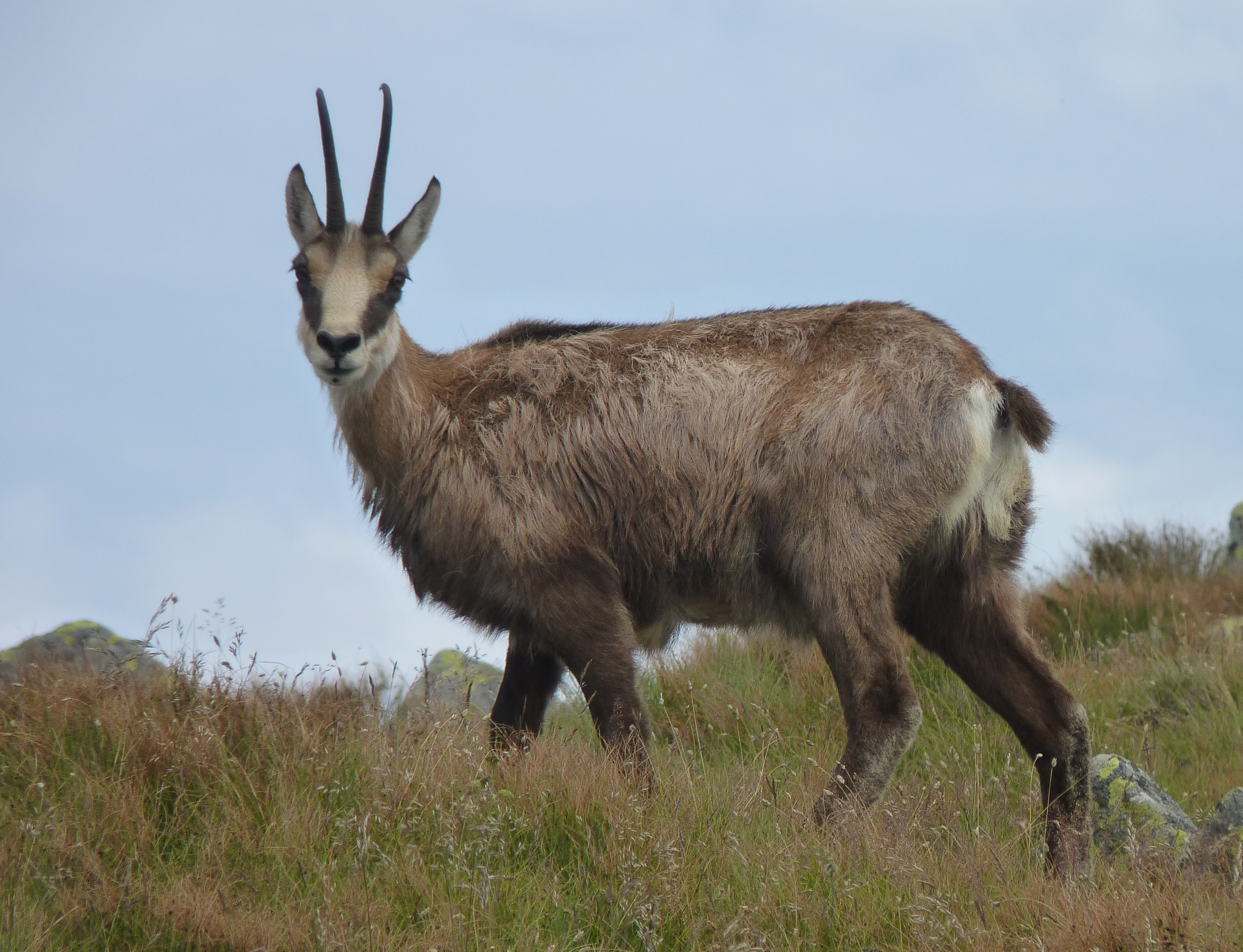
Tatra chamois (Rupicapra rupicapra tatrica)

== Fauna ==
The Tatra Mountains are home to many species of animals: 54 tardigrades, 22 turbellarians, 100 rotifers, 22 copepods, 162 spiders, 81 molluscs, 43 mammals, 200 birds, 7 amphibians, and 2 reptiles.

The most notable mammals are the Tatra chamois, Alpine marmot, Tatra marmot, European snow vole, Eurasian brown bear, Eurasian wolf, Carpathian lynx, red deer, roe deer, and wild boar. Notable fish include the brown trout and Alpine bullhead. Notable birds include the golden eagle, white-throated dipper, ring ouzel, wallcreeper, and Eurasian three-toed woodpecker.

The endemic arthropod species include a caddis fly, the spider Xysticus alpicola and a springtail.

== Summits ==
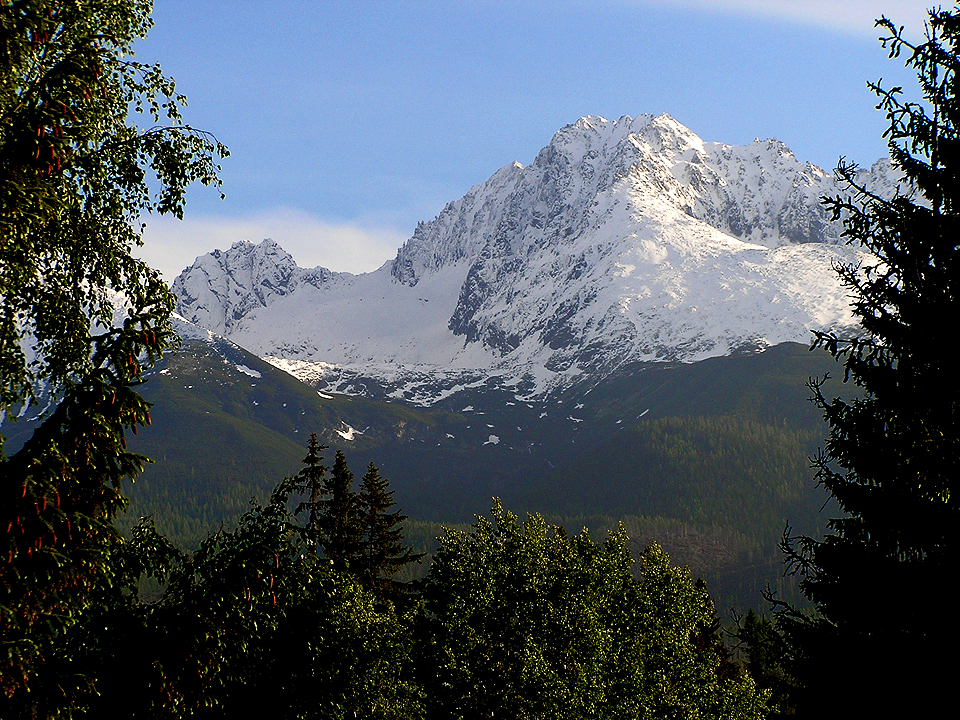
Gerlachovský štít (2,655 metres or 8,711 feet), the highest peak in Slovakia

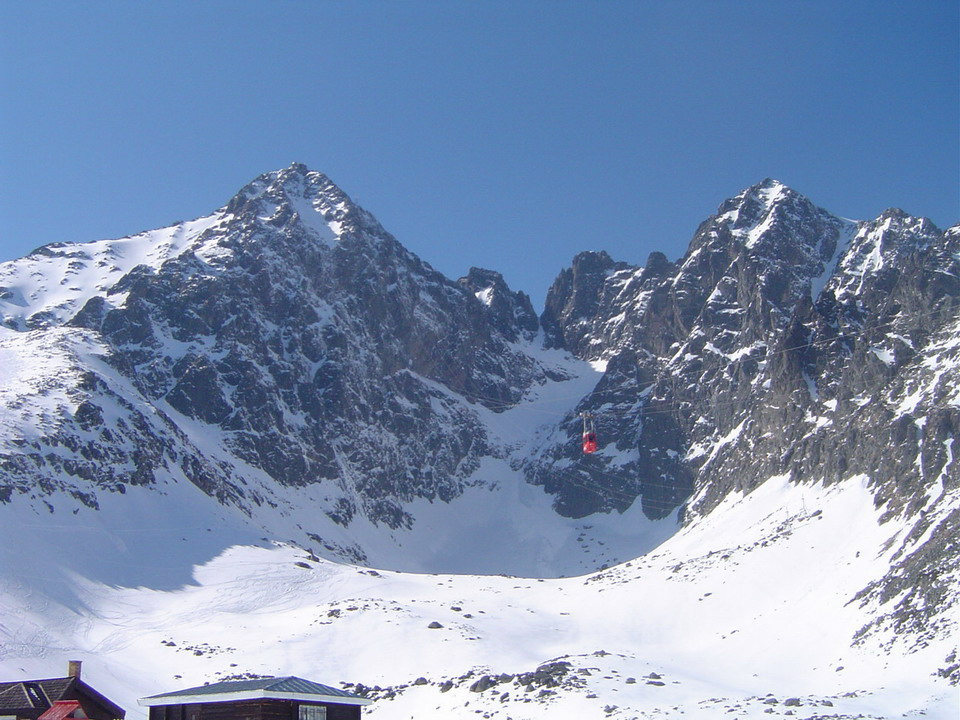
Lomnický štít (left) (2,634 metres or 8,642 feet) and Kežmarský štít (right) (2,558 metres or 8,392 feet)

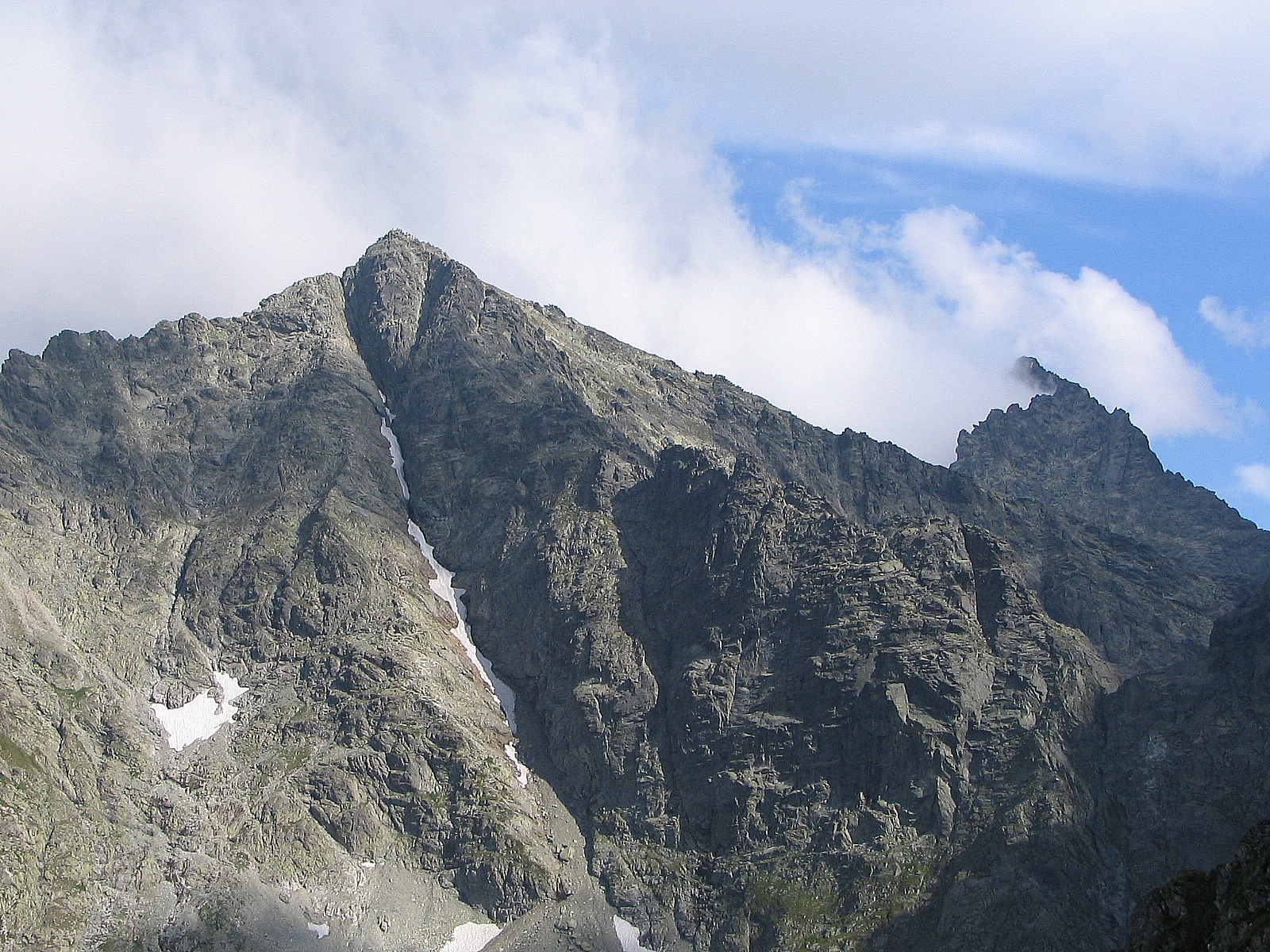
Rysy (2,500 metres or 8,200 feet), the highest peak in Poland

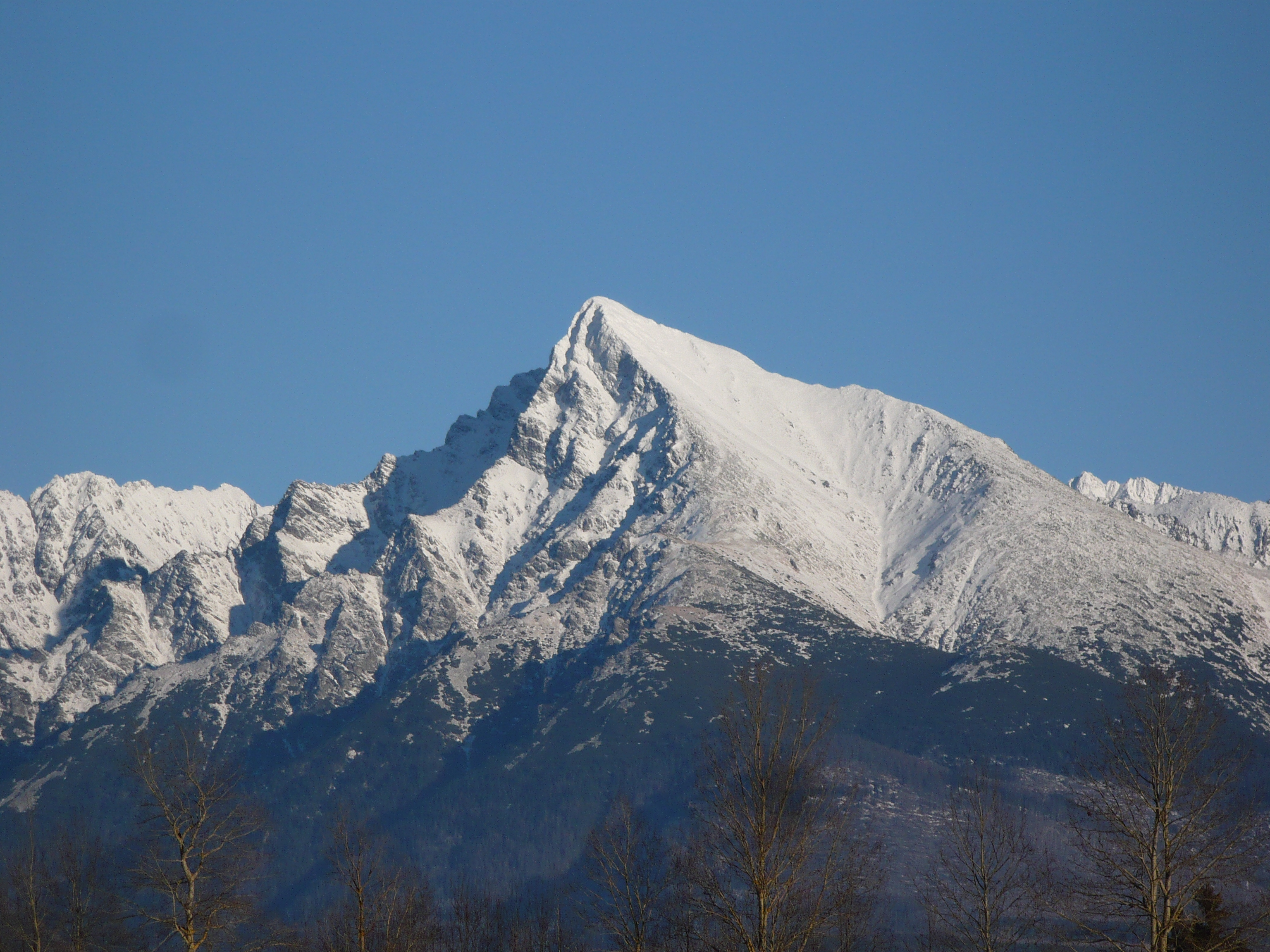
Kriváň (2,495 metres or 8,186 feet), the country's symbol on 1,2, and 5 euro cents

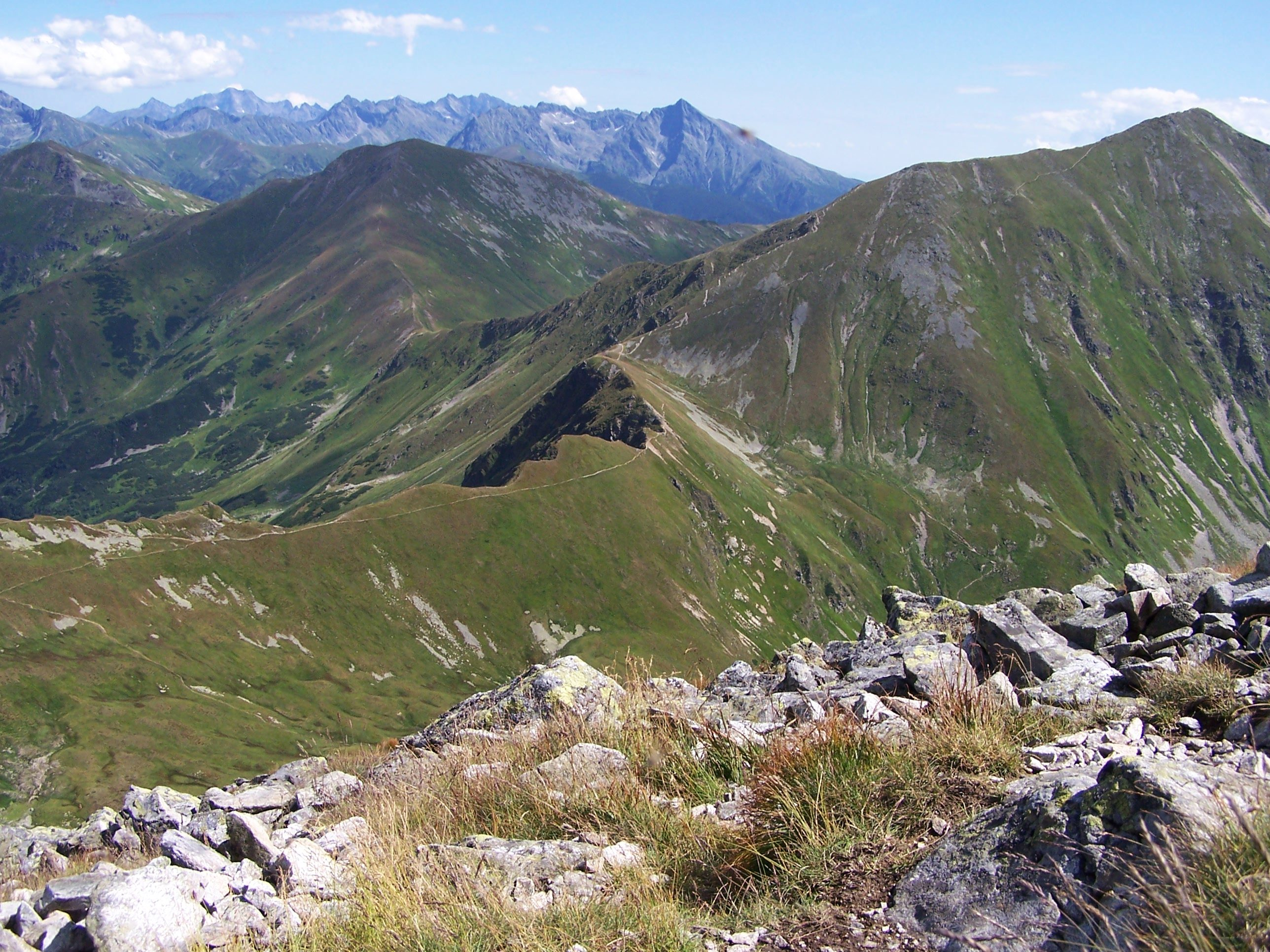
Bystrá (2,248 metres or 7,375 feet)

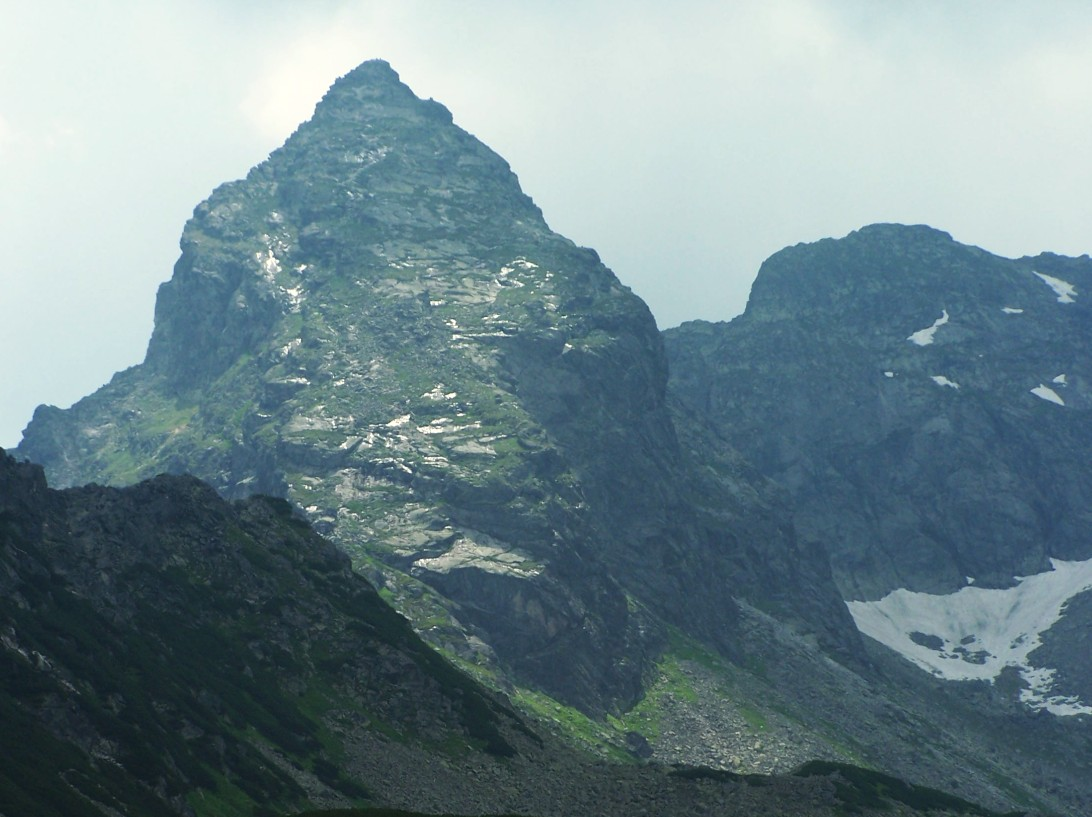
Kościelec (2,155 metres or 7,070 feet)

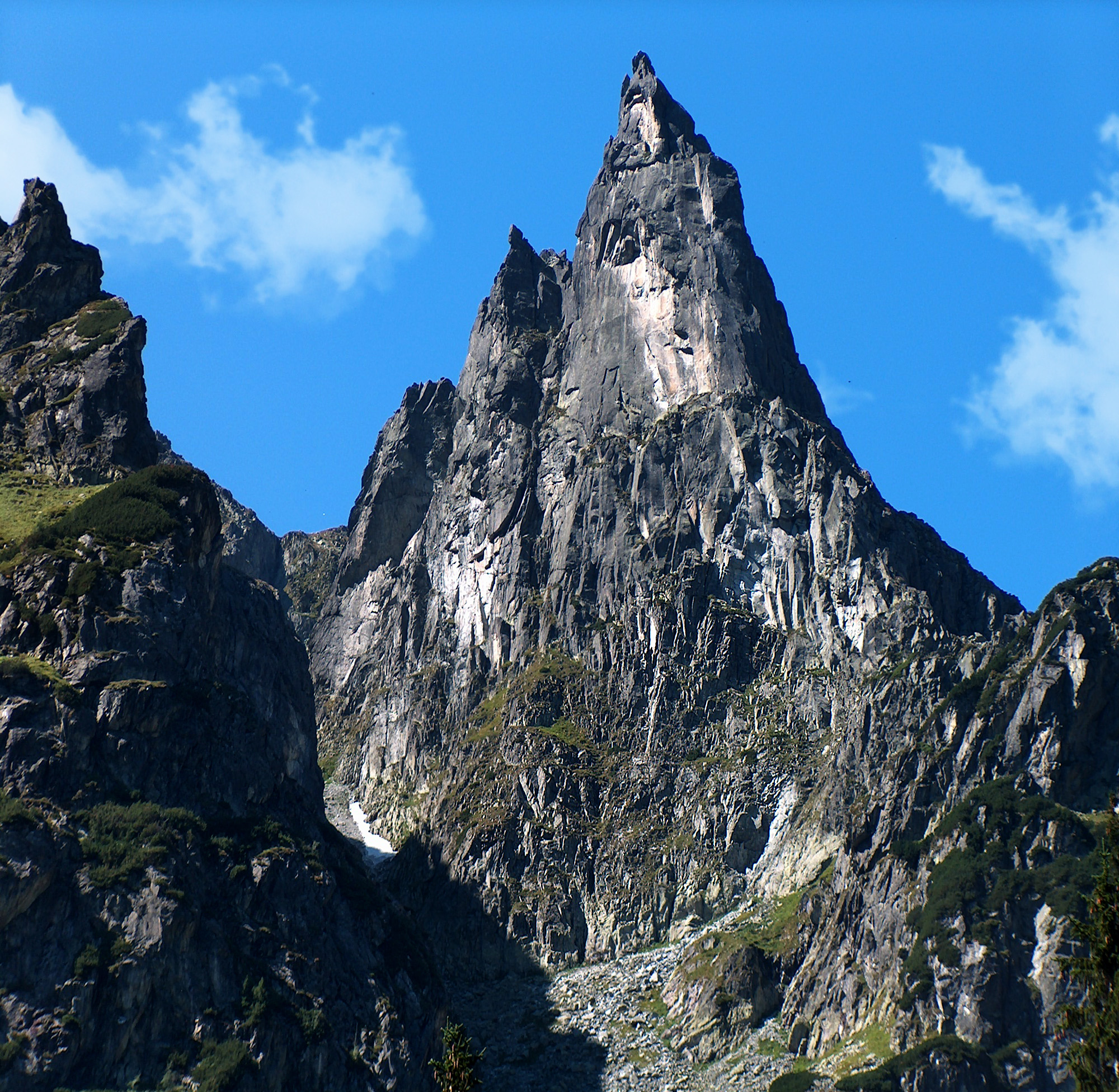
Mnich (2,068 metres or 6,785 feet)

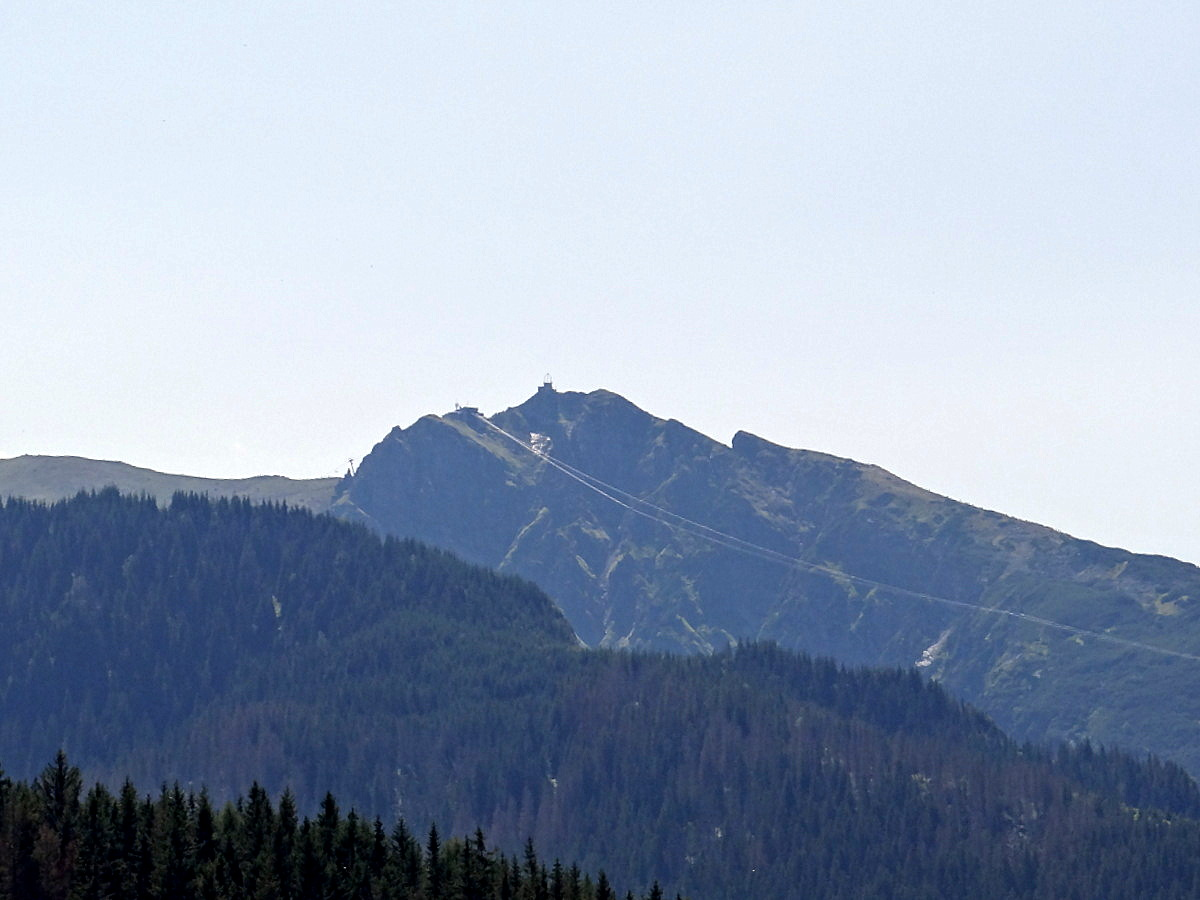
Kasprowy Wierch (1,987 metres or 6,519 feet)

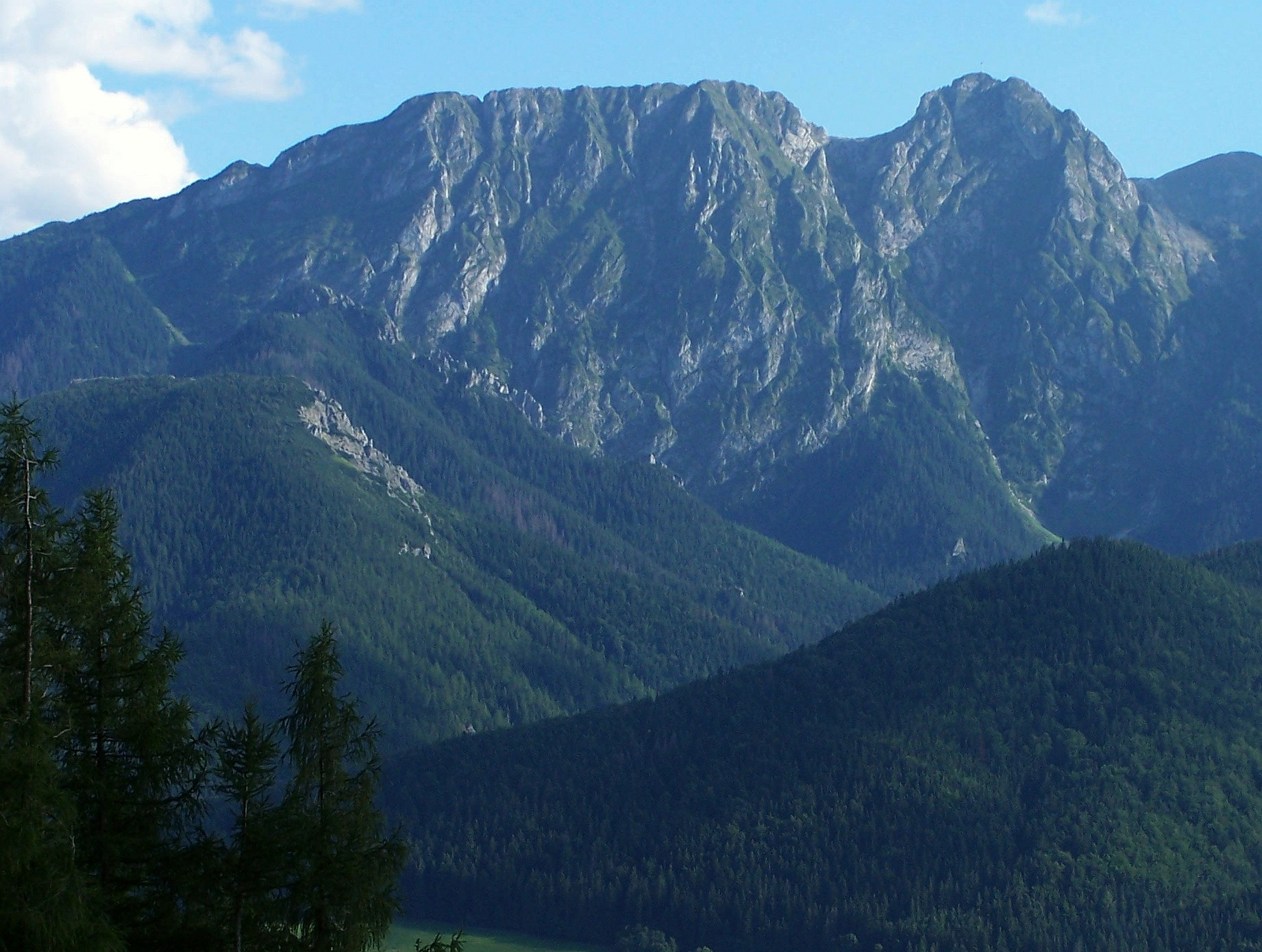
Giewont called "Sleeping Knight" (1,895 metres or 6,217 feet)

=== Eastern Tatras ===
- Gerlachovský štít - 2655 m (Slovakia)
- Gerlachovská veža - 2642 (Slovakia)
- Lomnický štít - 2634 m (Slovakia)
- Ľadový štít - 2627 m (Slovakia)
- Pyšný štít - 2621 m (Slovakia)
- Zadný Gerlach - 2616 m (Slovakia)
- Lavínový štít - 2606 m (Slovakia)
- Ľadová kopa - 2602 m (Slovakia)
- Kotlový štít - 2601 m (Slovakia)
- Malý Pyšný štít - 2592 m (Slovakia)
- Kežmarský štít - 2558 m (Slovakia)
- Vysoká - 2547 m (Slovakia)
- Končistá - 2538 m (Slovakia)
- Baranie rohy - 2526 m (Slovakia)
- Dračí štít - 2523 m (Slovakia)
- Ťažký štít - 2520 m (Slovakia)
- Malý Kežmarský štít - 2513 m (Slovakia)
- Rysy - 2503 m, 2499 m (Slovakia/Poland)
- Kriváň - 2495 m (Slovakia)
- Slavkovský štít - 2452 m (Slovakia)
- Batizovský štít - 2448 m (Slovakia)
- Veľký Mengusovský štít (Slovak); Mięguszowiecki Szczyt Wielki (Polish) - 2438 m (Slovakia/Poland)
- Malé Rysy (Slovak); Niżnie Rysy (Polish) - 2430 m (Slovakia/Poland)
- Východná Vysoká - 2429 m (Slovakia)
- Východný Mengusovský štít (Slovak); Mięguszowiecki Szczyt Czarny (Polish) - 2410 m (Slovakia/Poland)
- Prostredný Mengusovský štít (Slovak); Mięguszowiecki Szczyt Pośredni (Polish) - 2393 m (Slovakia/Poland)
- Čubrina (Slovak); Cubryna (Polish) - 2376 m (Slovakia/Poland)
- Svinica (Slovak); Świnica (Polish) - 2301 m (Slovakia/Poland)
- Kozi Wierch - 2291 m (Poland)
- Jahňaci štít - 2230 m (Slovakia)
- Zamarła Turnia - 2179 m (Poland)
- Hrubý štít (Slovak); Szpiglasowy Wierch (Polish) - 2172 m (Slovakia/Poland)
- Kościelec - 2155 m (Poland)
- Wołoszyn - 2155 m (Poland)
- Mnich - 2068 m (Poland)

=== Western Tatras ===
- Bystrá - 2248 m (Slovakia)
- Jakubina - 2194 m (Slovakia)
- Baranec - 2184 m (Slovakia)
- Baníkov - 2178 m (Slovakia)
- Klin (Slovak); Starorobociański Wierch (Polish) - 2176 m (Slovakia/Poland)
- Pachoľa - 2167 m (Slovakia)
- Hrubá kopa - 2166 m (Slovakia)
- Nižná Bystrá - 2163 m (Slovakia)
- Štrbavy - 2149 m (Slovakia)
- Jalovecký príslop - 2142 m (Slovakia)
- Hrubý vrch (Slovak); Jarząbczy Wierch (Polish) - 2137 m (Slovakia/Poland)
- Tri kopy - 2136 m (Slovakia)
- Veľká Kamenistá (Slovak); Kamienista (Polish) - 2126 m (Slovakia/Poland)
- Kresanica (Slovak); Krzesanica (Polish) - 2122 m (Slovakia/Poland) - summit of Czerwone Wierchy / Red Peaks
- Malolúčniak (Slovak); Małołączniak (Polish) - 2096 m (Slovakia/Poland)
- Temniak (Slovak); Ciemniak (Polish) - 2096 m (Slovakia/Poland)
- Volovec (Slovak); Wołowiec (Polish) - 2064 m (Slovakia/Poland)
- Kondratova kopa (Slovak); Kopa Kondracka (Polish) - 2005 m (Slovakia/Poland)
- Kasprov vrch (Slovak); Kasprowy Wierch (Polish) - 1987 m (Slovakia/Poland)
- Goričková kopa (Slovak); Goryczkowa Czuba (Polish) - 1911 m (Slovakia/Poland)
- Giewont - 1894 m (Poland)
- Kominiarski Wierch - 1829 m (Poland)
- Sivý vrch - 1809 m (Slovakia)
- Magura - 1704 m (Poland)
- Nosal - 1206 m (Poland)

== Tourism ==
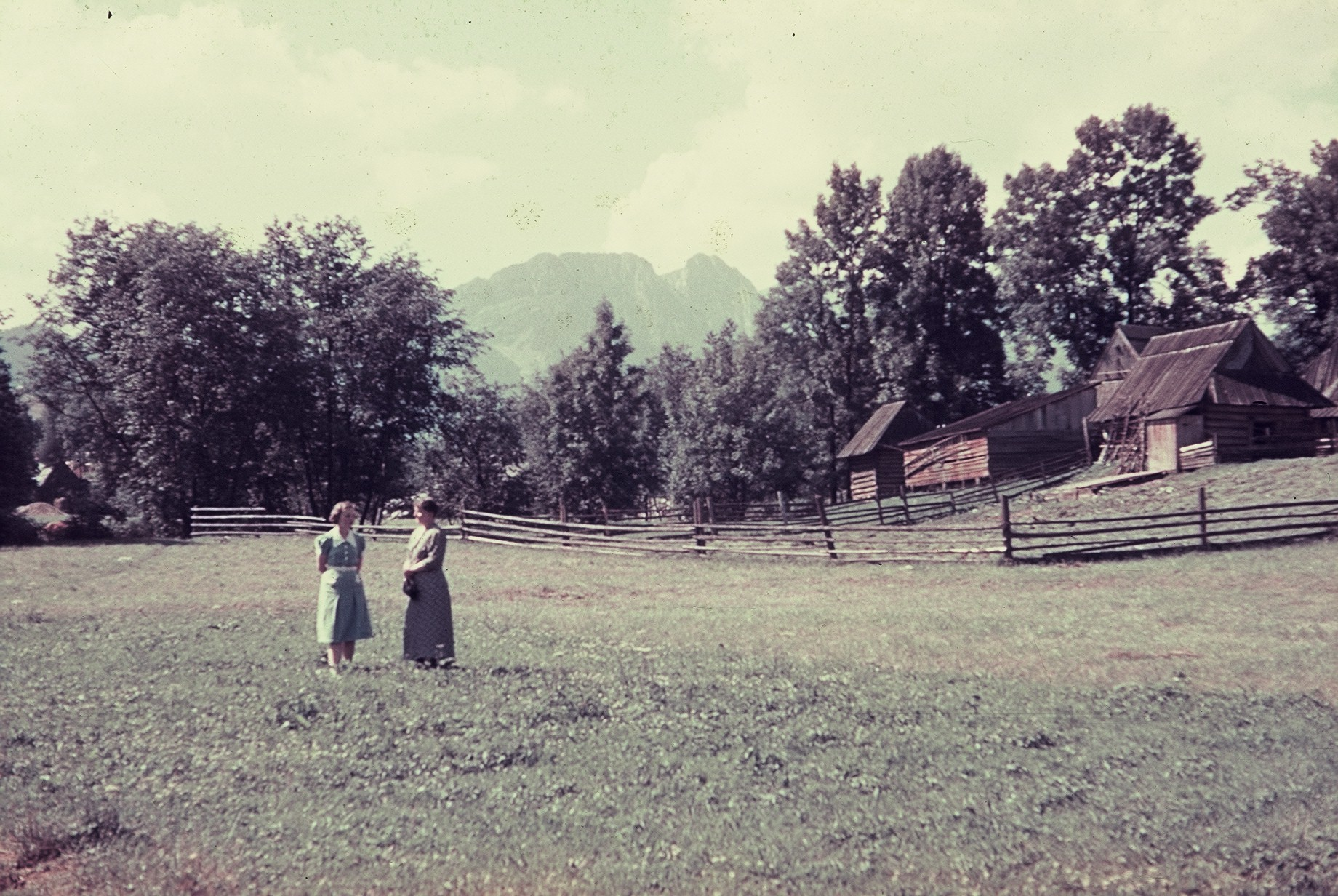
Tourists in Zakopane enjoying views of Giewont in 1938.

There are records of tourist visits to the Tatras as early as 1565.

In 1683, an anonymous author published a book of adventures and excursions in the Tatras titled Ungarischer Oder Dacianischer Simplicissimus, Vorstellend Seinen wunderlichen Lebens-Lauff, und sonderliche Begebenheiten gethaner Raisen, Nebenst Wahrhafter Beschreibung dess vormals im Nor gestandenen und offters verunruhigten Urgerland, which translates roughly to Hungarian or Dacian Simplicissimus, presenting his strange life and the peculiar events of his adventures, together with a true description of the ancient lands that once stood in the north and were often troubled. The author was later discovered to be Daniel Speer of Wrocław, who lived in the sub-Tatra region for about six years.

A popular tourist destination in Poland is Zakopane but the developed tourist base also includes Kościelisko, Poronin, Biały Dunajec, Bukowina Tatrzańska, Białka Tatrzańska, Murzasichle, Małe Ciche, Ząb, Jurgów, Brzegi.

In Slovakia, the most important tourist base is the city Vysoké Tatry, which consists of 15 settlements.

The Polish "national mountain" (featured prominently in myths and folklore) is Giewont, while the Slovak one is Kriváň.

In the Tatra, in the accessible areas you can practice hiking, scrambling, climbing, ice climbing and skiing.

=== Trails ===
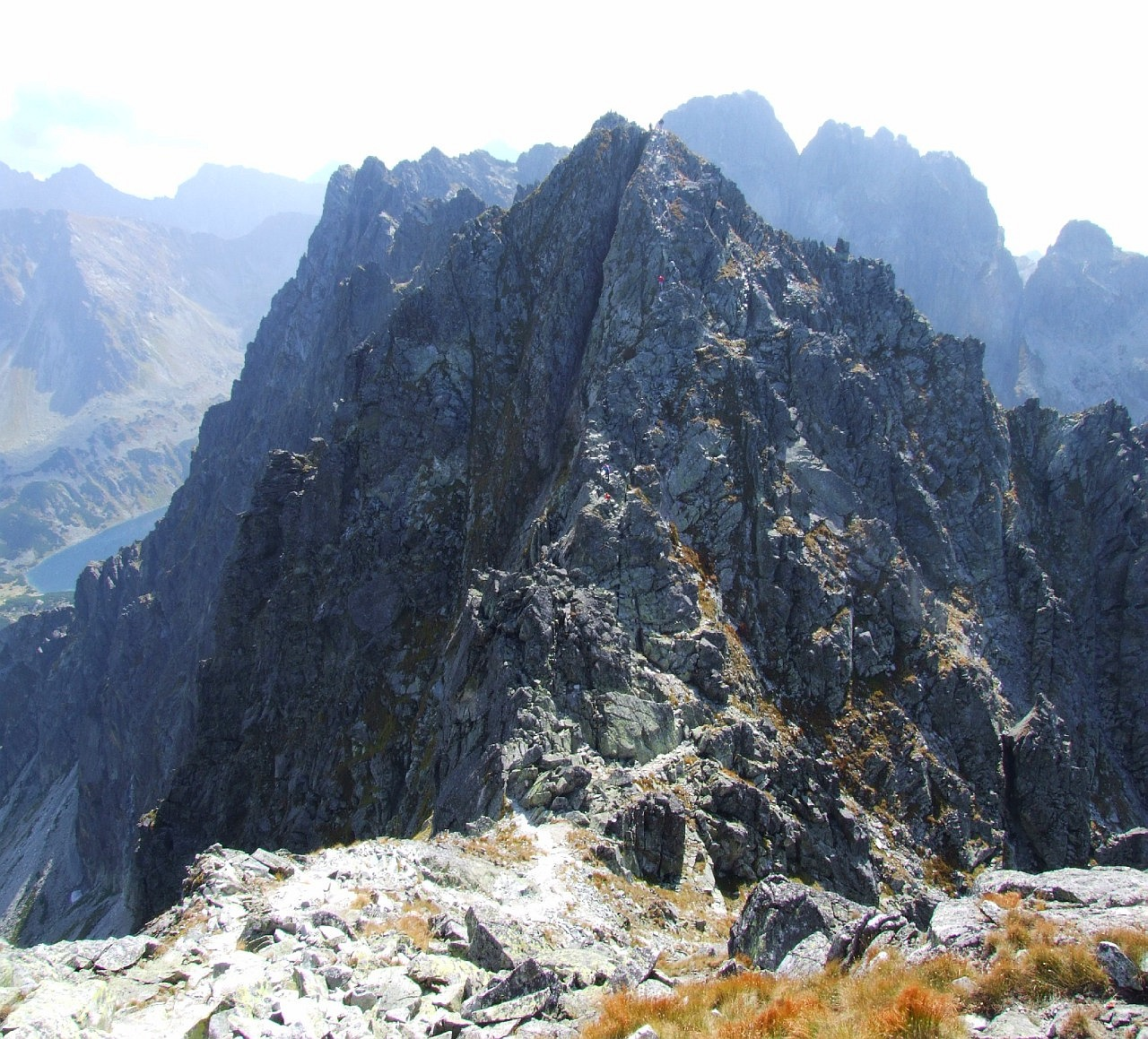
Pośredni Granat on the Orla Perć

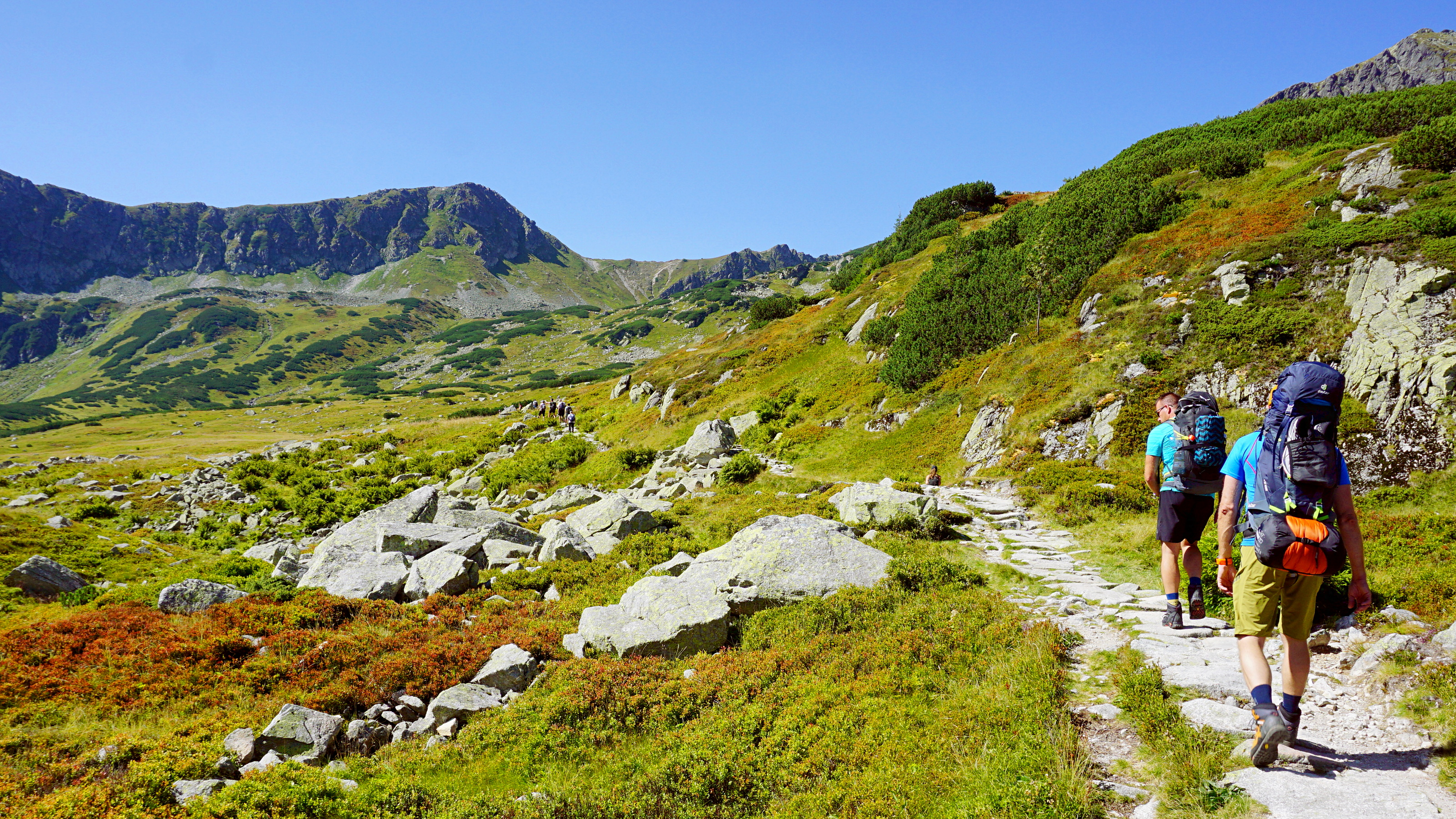
Hiking in the Polish Tatras

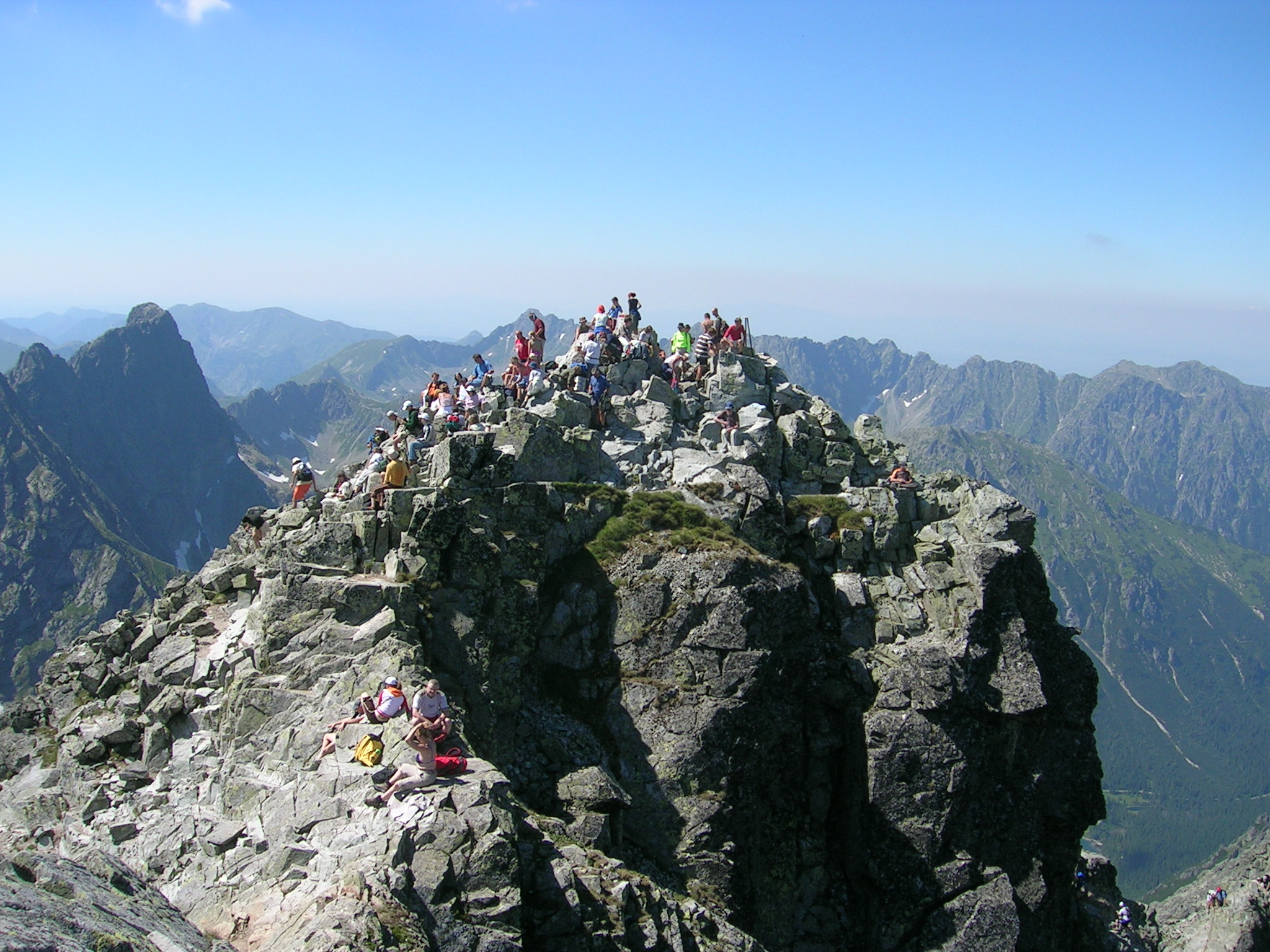
Crowded border summit of Rysy

Orla Perć is considered the most difficult and dangerous mountain trail in the Tatras, a suitable destination only for experienced tourists who don't have acrophobia, because there are strong exposures there. It lies exclusively within the Polish part of the Tatras, was conceived in 1901 by Franciszek Nowicki, a Polish poet and mountain guide, and was built between 1903 and 1906. Over 100 individuals have died on the route since it was established. The path is marked with red signs. The death of Polish philosopher Bronisław Bandrowski is often used by guides as a cautionary tale for tourists. He committed suicide after he was trapped for days on a rocky ledge in the Granaty massif.

The highest point in the Tatra Mountains that can be freely accessed by a labeled trail is Rysy. The trail requires good physical condition and resistance to exposure. From the Polish side elevation difference from the parking on the Palenica Białczańska lot is 1510 m.

Most of the peaks in the Western Tatras (on both sides of the border), including the main ridge, are freely accessible by hiking trails. In the Slovak part of the Eastern Tatras, only six peaks (out of 43 with prominence of at least 100 m) are accessible by hiking trails (Rysy, Svinica/Świnica, Slavkovský štít, Kriváň, Kôprovský štít, and Jahňací štít). Two of these (Rysy and Svinica/Świnica) are located on the border with Poland and accessible from the Polish side. The rest of the peaks on the Slovak side (including the highest one, Gerlachovský štít) can only be accessed when accompanied by a certified mountain guide. Members of UIAA mountain clubs can climb them without a certified guide. It's important to remember, however, that unmarked routes require excellent orientation and knowledge of the area's topography. Often, they also require climbing and rope techniques.

In the Slovak part, most of the hiking trails in the Tatras are closed from 1 November to 31 May. Only trails from settlements up to the mountain huts are open. In Poland, the trails are open year-round.

== Human engagement ==
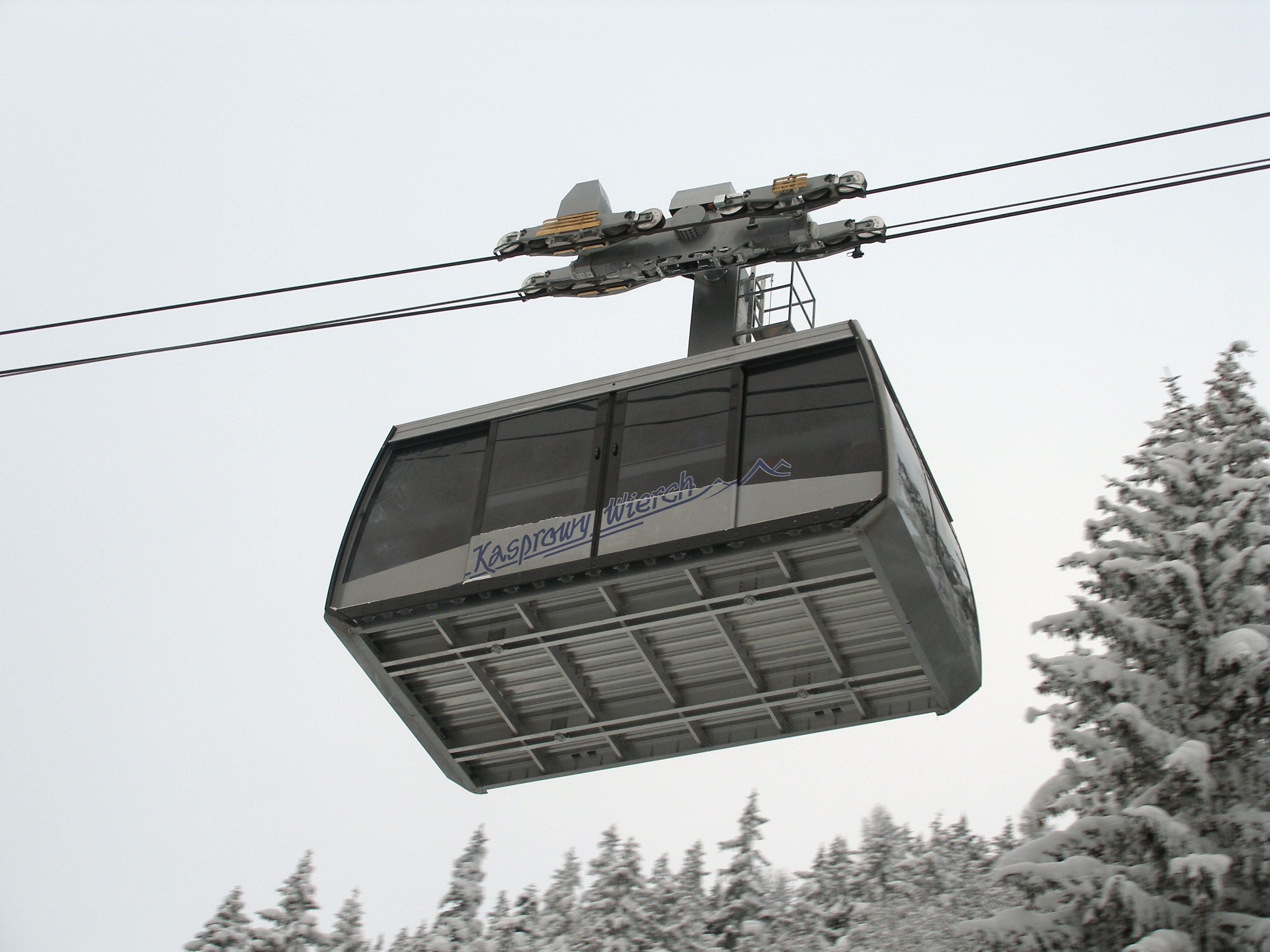
The cable car to Kasprowy Wierch generates a lot of tourist traffic

In the 18th and 19th centuries, the mountains were used for sheep grazing and mining. Many trees were cut down to make way for humans. These activities were stopped and nature regenerated. Currently, tourism is the largest source of direct and indirect human impact on the Tatra Mountains' natural environment. The ever-increasing pressure from tourism, sports, and recreation (mountain shelters, restaurants, public transport, funiculars and cable cars, trails, and ski slopes) is considered the most destructive form of human impact.

Currently, the Tatra Mountains are very popular, especially the Polish part. Although smaller than the Slovak one, the number of tourists is significantly higher. Over 5 million people visit the Polish part of the Tatras annually, making the Polish Tatra National Park the most frequently visited national park in Europe.

The Slovak Tatra National Park (Tatranský národný park; TANAP) was founded in 1949 (738 km^{2}, 285 sq mi), and the contiguous Polish Tatra National Park (Tatrzański Park Narodowy) in 1954 (215.56 km^{2}, 83.23 sq mi). The two parks were added jointly to the UNESCO Biosphere Reserve list in 1993.

In 2013, the International Union for Conservation of Nature threatened to cancel the Slovak TANAP's status of a national park because of the large investments (mainly in skiing infrastructure) in the park, which seriously interfere with the landscape and nature.

== In popular culture ==
- The theme of the song "Nad Tatrou sa blýska" is that there is a storm in the Tatras. The song was the second part of the dual national anthem of Czechoslovakia from 1918 to its dissolution in 1993, and has since become the national anthem of Slovakia.
- Czech composer Vítězslav Novák's 1902 symphonic poem V Tatrách ('In the Tatras', Op.26) was directly inspired by the mountains.
- "A 1930's ski-movie, filmed in Tatras, Poland". nevaasport.com.
- The 1999 film Ravenous was filmed in the Tatra Mountains.
- In 2006, the Bollywood film Fanaa, portraying places in Kashmir, was filmed at Zakopane, mainly because of the risks associated with insurgency in Kashmir, as well due to some similarities in a mountain landscape.
- Leo Frankowski mentions the Tatras several times in his science fiction novels in the Adventures of Conrad Stargard series.
- The Tatra Mountains are the setting of the 2024 Netflix crime drama television series Detective Forst, based on the Forst series by Remigiusz Mróz.

== Notable people ==
(Alphabetical by surname)

- Adam Asnyk, poet and dramatist, one of the first members of the Tatra Society
- Klemens Bachleda (1851–1910), Polish mountain guide and mountain rescuer
- Oswald Balzer
- Tytus Chałubiński, founder of the Polish Tatra Society
- Jan Długosz (mountaineer)
- Walery Eljasz-Radzikowski
- Julian Fałat
- Jan Nepomucen Głowacki, considered the father of Polish school of landscape painting, was the first to devote an entire series of works to Tatra Mountains
- Seweryn Goszczyński, Polish Romantic poet who escaped there from the Austrian invader
- Ludwig Greiner, identified Gerlachovský Peak as the summit of the Tatras and Carpathians
- Ruth Hale (alpinist)
- Władysław Hasior
- William Horwood (novelist), whose novel Wolves of Time largely takes place in the Tatra mountains
- Juraj Janosik
- Mieczysław Karłowicz
- Jan Kasprowicz
- Kornel Makuszyński
- Franciszek Nowicki
- Władysław Orkan
- Kazimierz Przerwa-Tetmajer
- Daniel Speer, Baroque composer and writer
- Stanisław Staszic
- Mieczysław Szczuka
- Karol Szymanowski
- Göran Wahlenberg
- Stanisław Witkiewicz
- Leon Wyczółkowski
- Władysław Zamoyski
- Mariusz Zaruski
- Ludwik Zejszner
- Stefan Żeromski

== Rankings ==
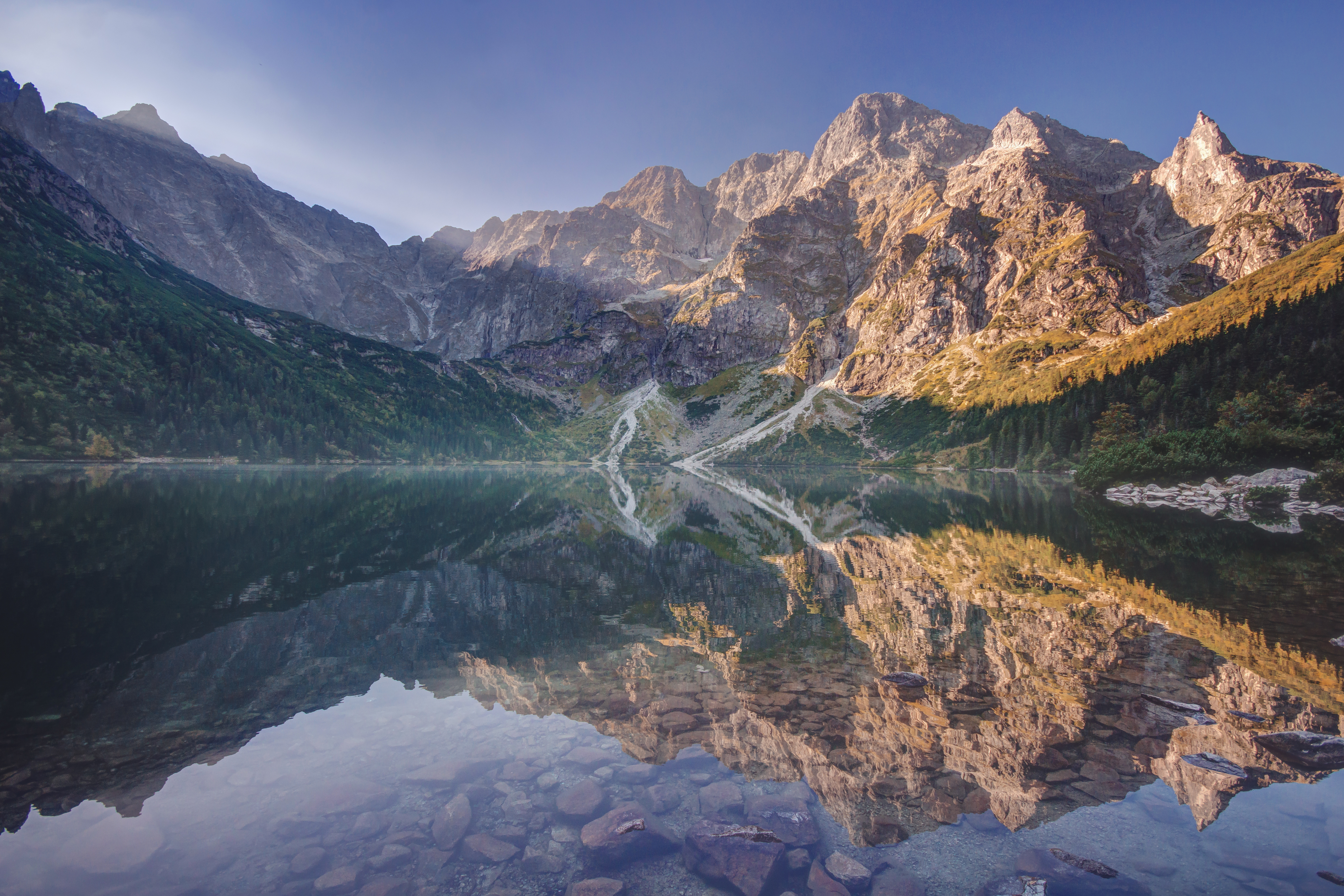
Morskie Oko

- Polish Tatra National Park is ranked 12th place by CNN
- The Wall Street Journal recognized Morskie Oko as one of the five most beautiful lakes in the world

== See also ==
- Mała Armia Janosika
- Mountain Rescue Service (Slovakia)
- Sudetes
- Tatrzańskie Ochotnicze Pogotowie Ratunkowe (Tatra Volunteer Search and Rescue (Poland))
- Tourism in Poland
- Tatra pastures

== Bibliography ==
- Lacika, Ján (2006). Tatras (2nd ed.). Bratislava. ISBN 80-88975-95-6.
- Saunders, Colin; Nárožná, Renáta (2006). Walking in the High Tatras (2nd ed.). Cicerone Press (Milnthorpe). ISBN 978-1-85284-482-0.
