= Świnica =

Peak in High Tatras between Slovakia and Poland

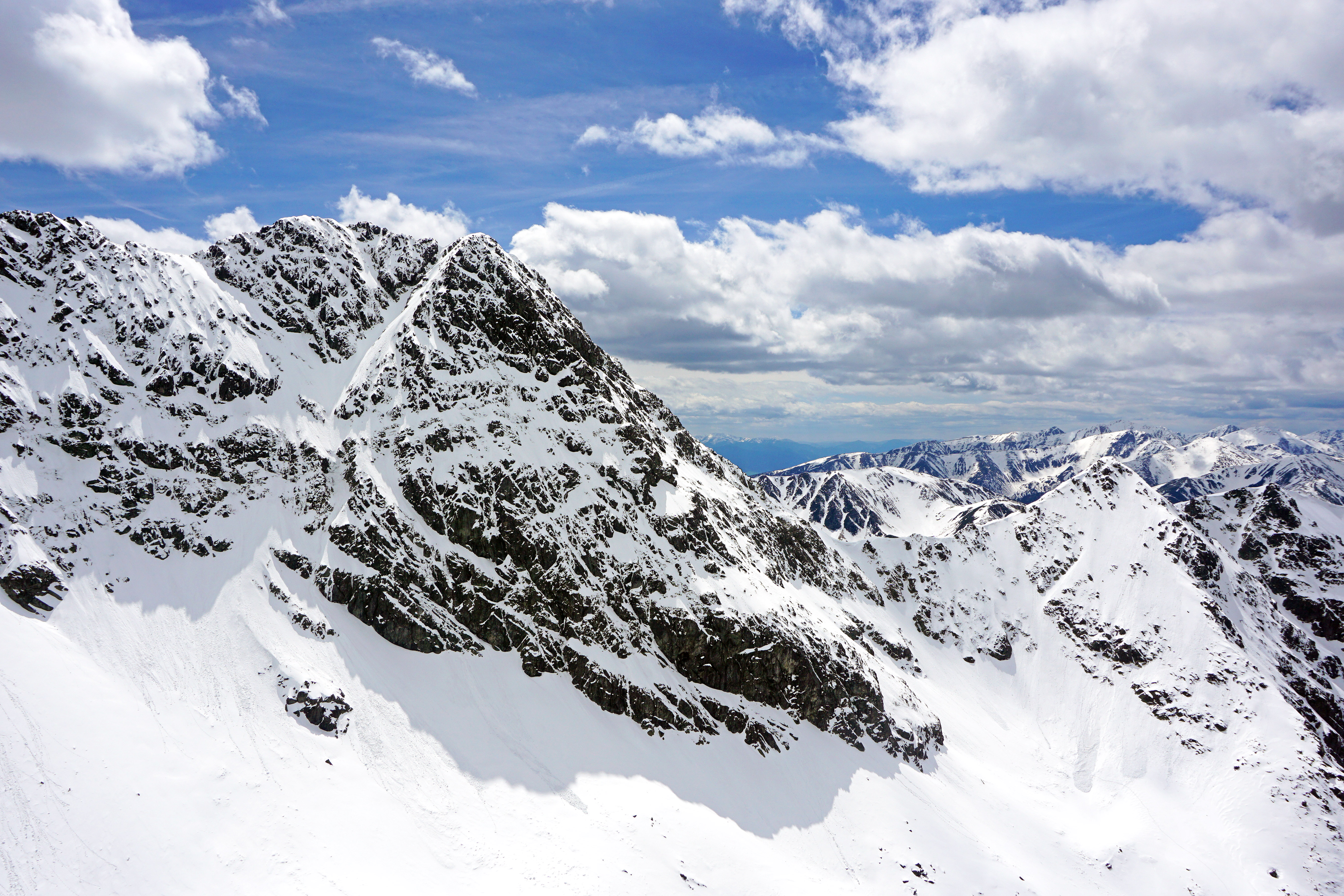
- Świnica mountain seen from Kościelec

Highest point
- Elevation: 2,302 m (7,552 ft)
- Prominence: 383 m (1,257 ft)
- Listing: Mountains of Poland
- Coordinates: 49°13′10″N 20°00′33″E

Geography
- Location within Slovakia Location within Poland
- Countries: Poland and Slovakia
- Parent range: Tatra Mountains

Climbing
- First ascent: 1867 by Maciej Sieczka

Świnica seen from Kasprowy Wierch

Świnica (Polish) or Svinica (Slovak) is a mountain in the main ridge of the High Tatras, on the Polish-Slovak border. The main peak is at 2,302 m AMSL. A marked trail leads through the summit.

The Polish name Świnica (derivative form of a pig or swine) was given to this summit in the mid 19th century. It probably refers to the resemblance of the peak to silhouette of a swine. Another etymology is that the summit was dangerous and difficult to reach. Accordingly, over the years there have been many fatal accidents on the mountain. It was first summited by Maciej Sieczka in 1867.
