= Mnich (mountain) =

Mountain in Poland

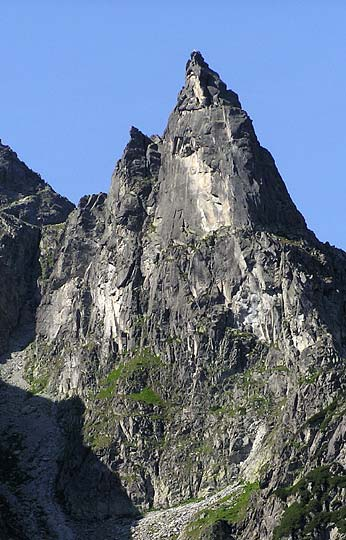

Highest point
- Elevation: 2,068 m (6,785 ft)
- Listing: Mountains of Poland
- Coordinates: 49°11′33″N 20°03′18″E

Naming
- English translation: monk
- Language of name: Polish

Geography
- Location within Lesser Poland Voivodeship Location within Poland
- Country: Poland
- Parent range: High Tatras, Tatra Mountains

Geology
- Mountain type: Granite

Climbing
- First ascent: Maciej Sieczka, Jan Gwalbert Pawlikowski 1879 or 1880
- Easiest route: Climbing

Mnich (English: Monk) a 2,068-meter-high crag in the Polish Tatras, in the Rybi Potok Valley, above the southwestern shore of Morskie Oko, from which it rises with a 675-meter-high silhouette. Alongside the Mięguszowiecki Summits, it is the second characteristic feature of this lake's surroundings.

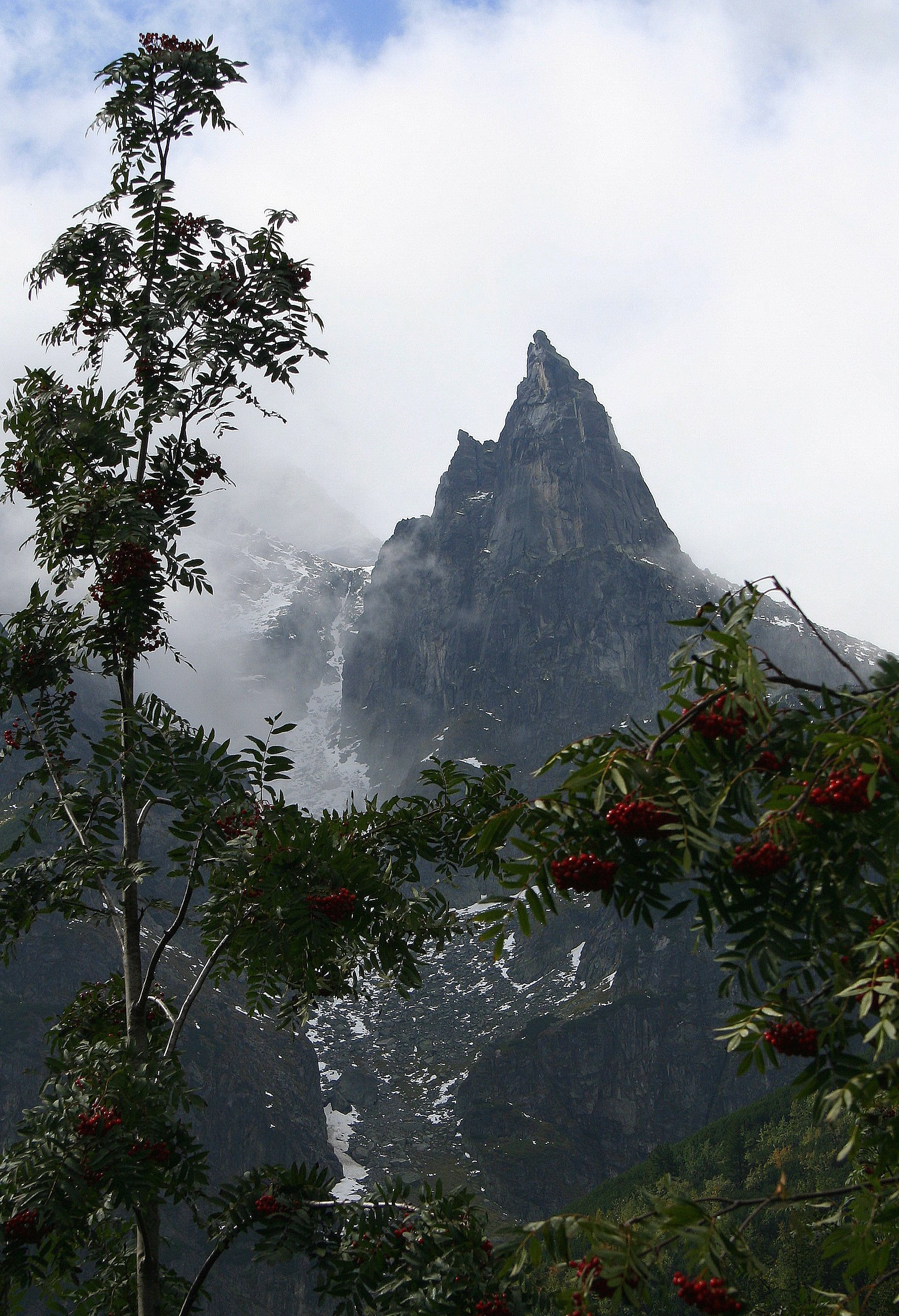
Mnich
