= Sonata in D minor (Speer) =

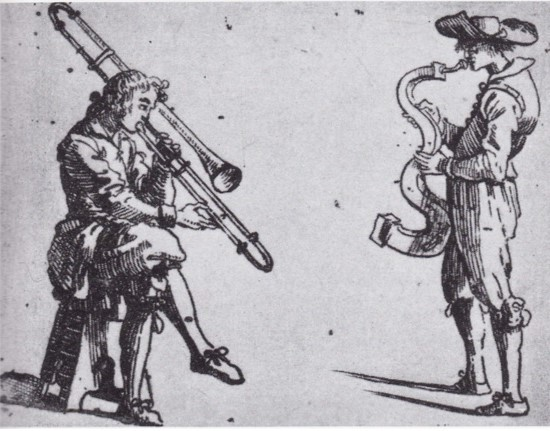
Etching from the series Figure con instrumenti musicali e boscarecci by Giovanni Battista Braccelli showing Baroque musicians playing a trombone and a serpent

The Sonata in D minor is a sonata for brass quintet (2 cornetts, 3 trombones and continuo) by the Baroque composer Georg Daniel Speer (1636–1709)

== Background ==
Speer was born in current day Wrocław, Poland (formerly Breslau) and died in Göppingen, Germany. As a composer, he wrote sonatas for trombones (formerly known as sackbuts) and cornetti with basso continuo. However, Speer is most widely known for his Sonata No. 29 from Die Bänkelsängerlieder for brass quintet. He was more well known for his music theory during his lifetime. However, there is no official document attesting to his activities before 1664. Speer was also a prolific writer with three or four autobiographical novels that shed light on the music scene of his era. Aside from the autobiographies, Speer wrote a musical treatise that is considered very useful in understanding Middle Baroque music (the time period in which he composed). During the Middle Baroque period trombones (sackbuts) gained popularity in part thanks to composers like Speer, who wrote music specifically for trombones – most notably his trombone sonatas.

== Music ==
=== Instrumentation and general composition ===
Speer's trombone sonatas are all written using the same basic instrumentation – 2 or 3 cornetti, 3 or 4 trombones, and continuo. In these sonatas the trombones play the main subject or theme while the cornetti provide a counter-melody and the continuo plays in harmony. The melody line trades between all 4 trombones in different ranges; generally the alto trombone would play the first iteration of the theme, then the theme would move down to the second alto/tenor trombone, then the tenor trombone takes over, and finally the bass trombone or contrabass trombone would play the final iteration of the theme and the 4 trombones will either end in unison or in harmony on the tonic chord. This specific sonata is written for six voices: 2 cornetti, 3 trombones, and basso continuo.
