= Szpiglasowy Wierch =

Mountain between Poland and Slovakia

- Hrubý štít
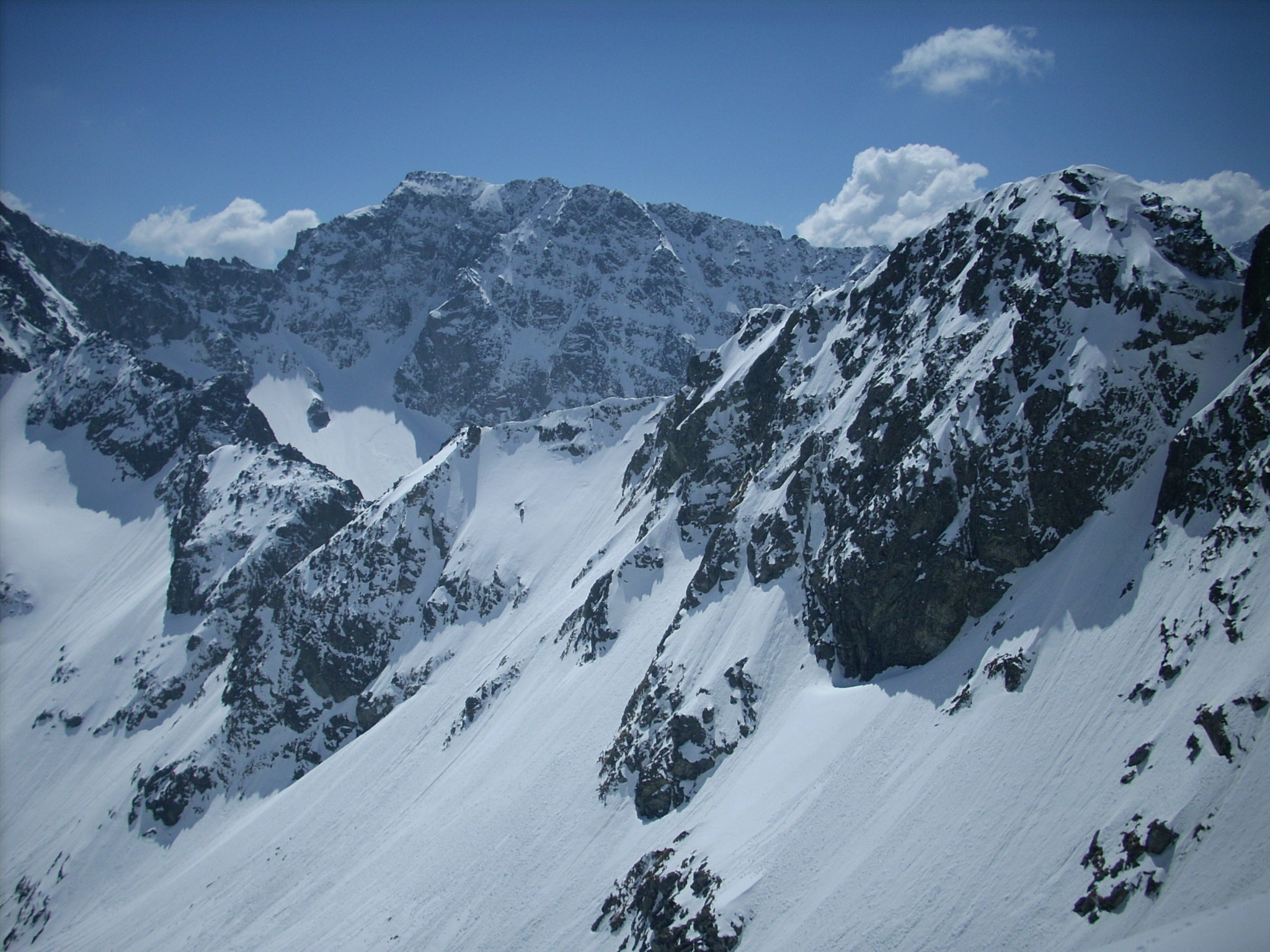
- Szpiglasowy Wierch (on the right)

Highest point
- Elevation: 2,172 m (7,126 ft)
- Prominence: 62 m (203 ft)
- Coordinates: 49°11′50″N 20°02′24″E

Geography
- Countries: Poland and Slovakia
- Regions: Lesser Poland and Prešov
- Parent range: High Tatras, Tatra Mountains

Szpiglasowy Wierch (Slovak: Hrubý štít) is a mountain situated on the main ridge of the Tatra Mountains in the High Tatras mountain range on the border between Poland and Slovakia and is accessible via a tourist trail. Stibnite, a source of antimony, used to be extracted in mines located in Szpiglasowy Wierch’s vicinity. The German name for the mineral (Spiessglanz) is the ultimate source for the mountain's Polish name.
