= Slavkovský štít =

Mountain in High Tatras, Slovakia

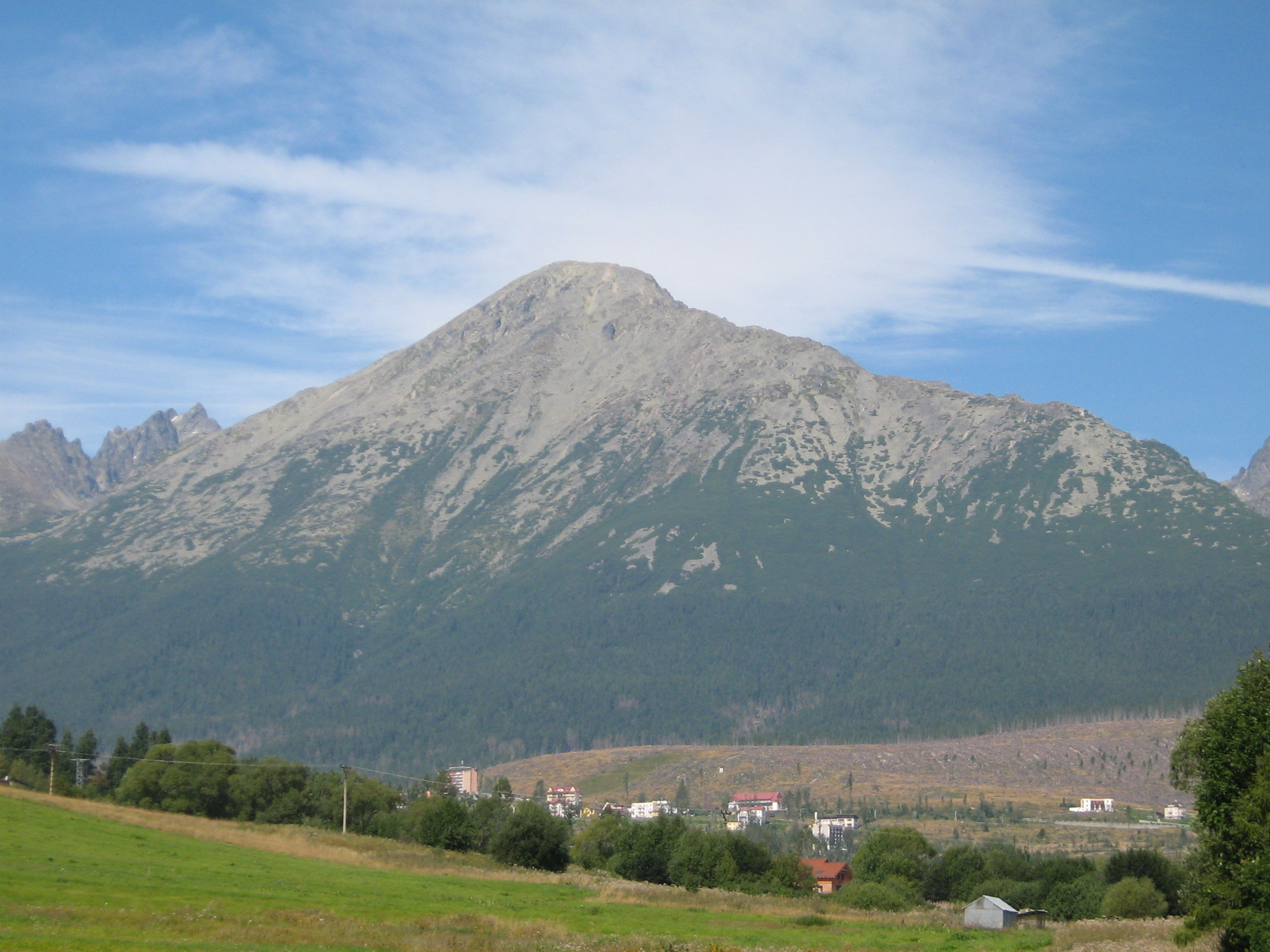
- Slavkovský štít viewed from Nová Lesná

Highest point
- Elevation: 2,452 m (8,045 ft)
- Prominence: 225 m (738 ft)
- Coordinates: 49°9′58″N 20°11′5″E

Geography
- Location within Slovakia
- Location: Tatra National Park, Poprad, Prešov, Slovakia
- Parent range: High Tatras

Geology
- Mountain type: granite

Climbing
- Easiest route: hike

Slavkovský štít is the fourth highest mountain peak that can be reached on a marked trail in the High Tatra mountains in Slovakia. Its summit is 2452 metres above sea level. It can be reached by foot on a walking trail in about four and a half hours from Starý Smokovec. The first recorded ascent was by Juraj Buchholtz in 1664 and it took the group of 12 members 2 days; only 4 of them reached the summit.

In the 19th century it was considered to build Observatory and Meteorological Station on the summit together with a lift going up from Starý Smokovec. The project turned out to be technically unrealistic.
