= Cubryna =

Mountain on the Poland / Slovakia border

- Čubrina
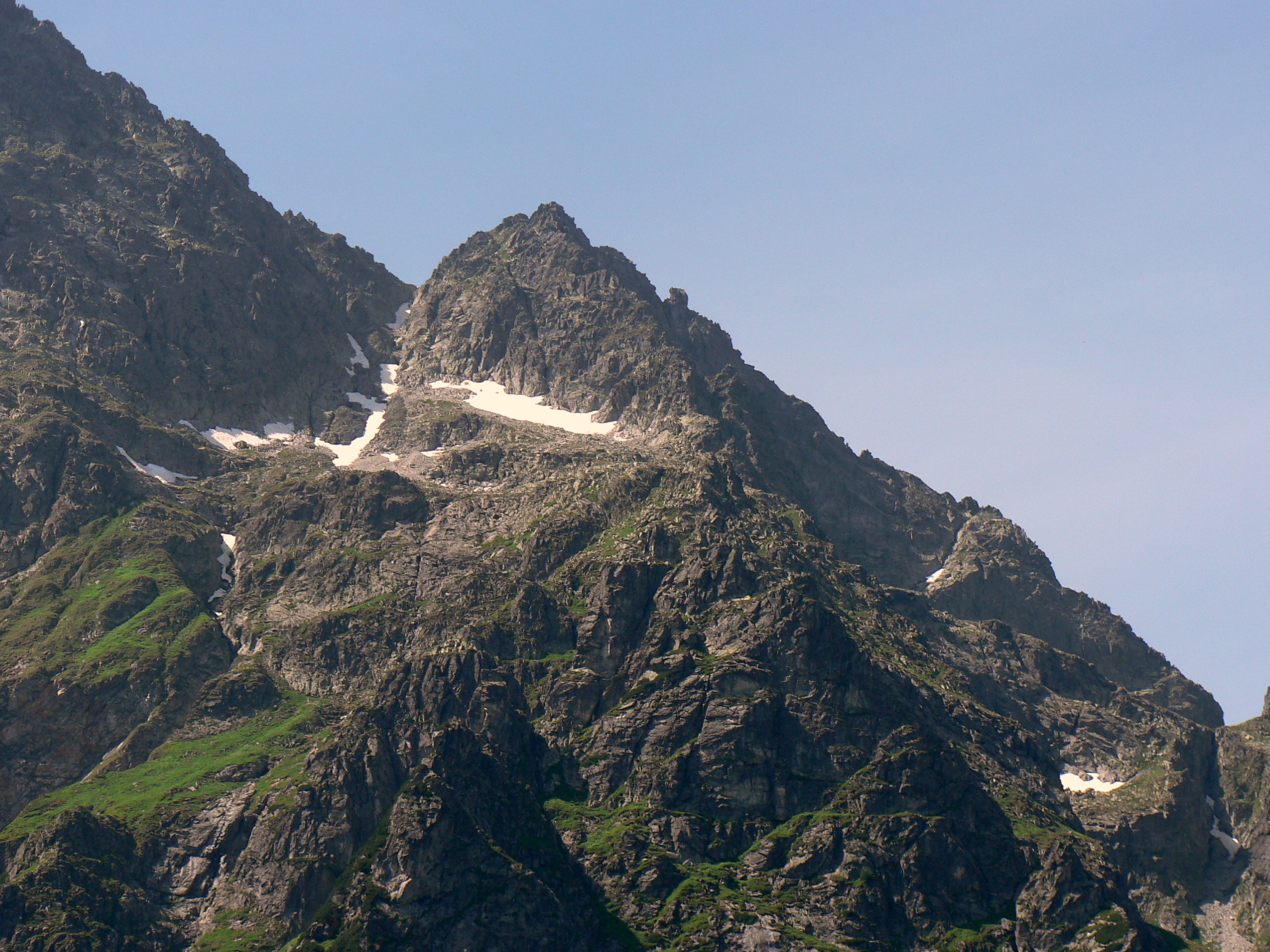
- Cubryna seen from Morskie Oko

Highest point
- Elevation: 2,376 m (7,795 ft)
- Prominence: 58 m (190 ft)
- Coordinates: 49°11′16″N 20°03′13″E

Geography
- Countries: Poland and Slovakia
- Regions: Lesser Poland and Prešov
- Parent range: High Tatras, Tatra Mountains

Climbing
- First ascent: 1884 by Karol Potkański, Kazimierz Bednarz and Jan Fedra

Cubryna (Slovak: Čubrina) is a mountain in the High Tatras mountain range, situated on the main ridge of the Tatras between Mięguszowiecki Szczyt Wielki and Zadni Mnich, on the border between Poland and Slovakia. At 2376 meters, it's one of the highest peaks in Poland.

Cubryna is the place where the main ridge of the Tatras and the European watershed split. It is also the tripoint of Podhale, Spiš and Liptov historical and geographical regions.
