= Daniel Speer =

Slovak music educator, composer, educator and writer

Georg Daniel Speer (2 July 1636 – 5 October 1707) was a German composer and writer of the Baroque.

Speer was born in Breslau (today Wrocław, Poland) and died in Göppingen, Germany.

== Writing ==
As a writer he wrote a musical treatise, political tracts, and fiction. In 1687 he published a treatise on music that is considered useful in understanding Middle Baroque music. His writing on music would influence German Baroque trombone works for over a century. In non-musical writing his political tracts led to his being imprisoned for a year and a half. In literature he is known for three or four autobiographical novels that give a feel of the musical scene of his era and make use of humor. In them the narrator is referred to as Daniel Simplex. His novels had largely become obscure until rediscovery in the 1930s.

== Composing ==
As a composer, Speer for example produced music for trombones. Keyboard miniatures have also survived. He might be best known for his Sonata No. 29 from Die Bänkelsängerlieder for brass quintet, which is often played at weddings and formal occasions.

== Works ==
- 1683 – Türkischer Vagant
- 1683 – Ungarischer oder Dacianischer Simplicissimus
- 1684 - Die Bänkelsängerlieder
- 1685 – Recens Fabricatus Labor oder Neugebackene Tafelschnitz
- 1687 – Grundrichtiger Unterricht der musikalischen Kunst
- 1688 – Musikalisch-türkischer Eulenspiegel
- 1688 – Philomela angelica
- 1692 – Jubilum coeleste
- Sonata in D minor
