= Kościelec (High Tatras) =

Mountain in Poland

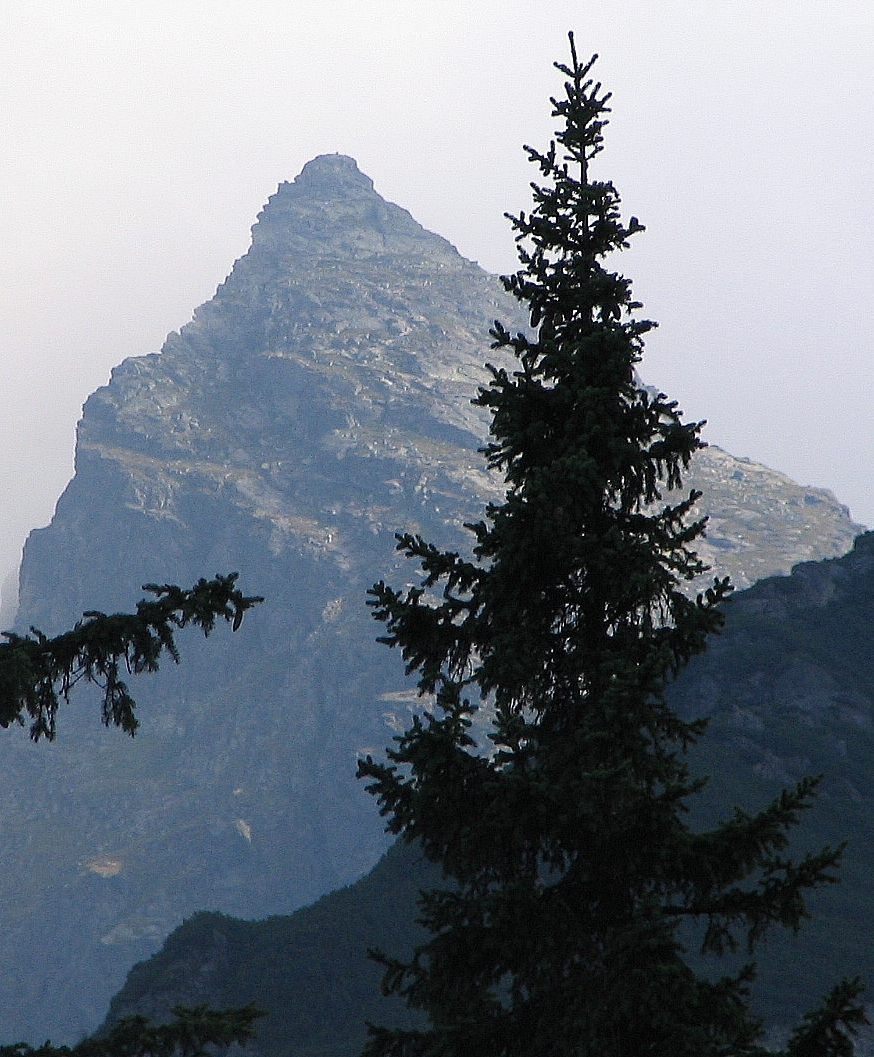
- Kościelec from Gąsienicowa Valley

Highest point
- Elevation: 2,155 m (7,070 ft)
- Prominence: 120 m (390 ft)
- Listing: Mountains of Poland
- Coordinates: 49°13′31″N 20°00′52″E

Naming
- English translation: Resembling a church
- Language of name: Polish

Geography
- Location within Poland
- Location: Lesser Poland Voivodeship, Poland
- Parent range: High Tatras

Geology
- Mountain type: Granite

Climbing
- Easiest route: Hiking

Kościelec (2,155 m above sea level) is a mountain in the High Tatras in the Gąsienicowa Valley of Poland.

== In popular culture ==
On February 8, 1909, the composer Mieczysław Karłowicz was killed at the age of 32 by an avalanche while skiing in the Little Kościelec. This incident was commemorated by Wojciech Kilar in his tone poem Kościelec 1909, composed in 1976.

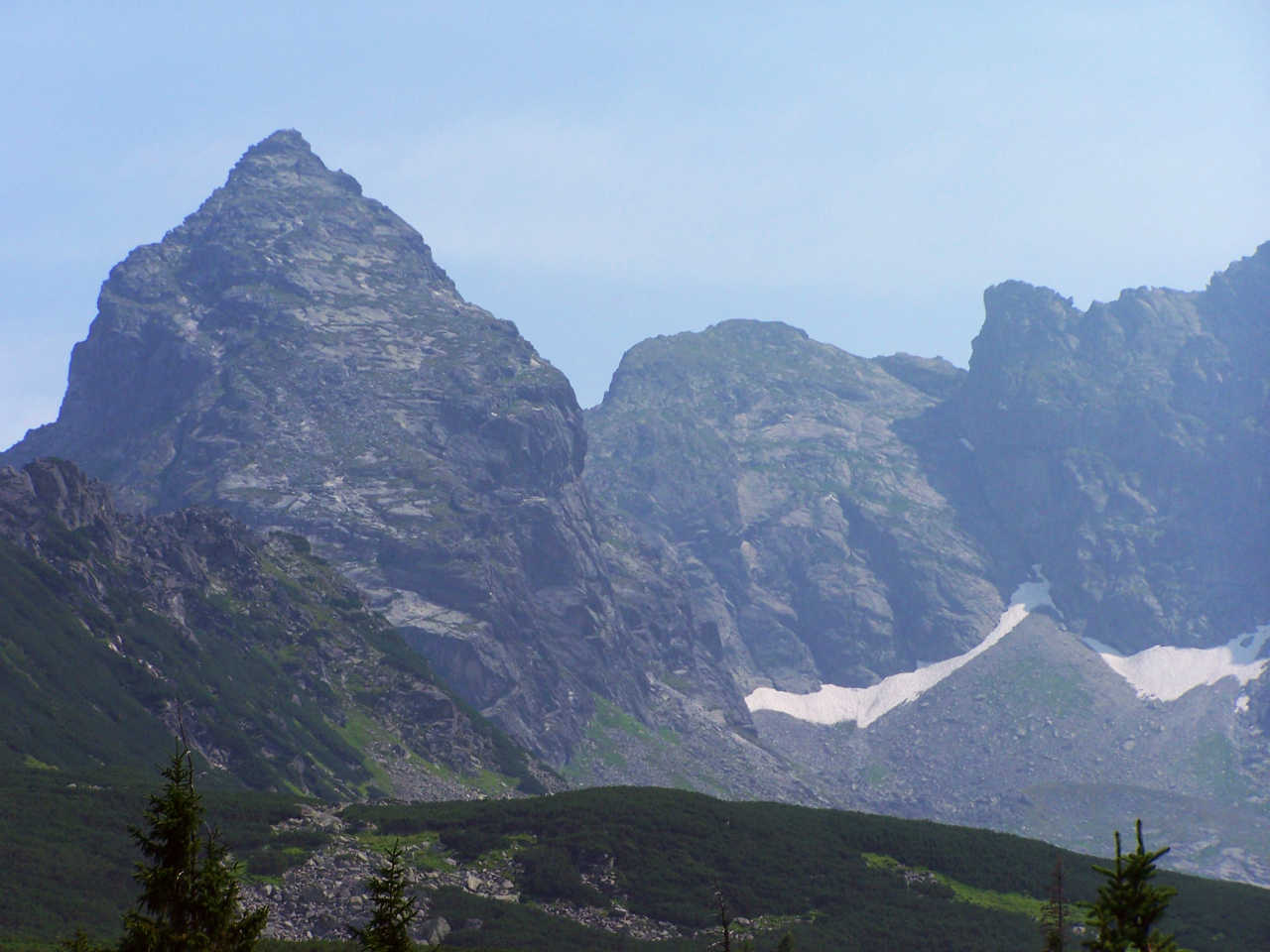
General view of Kościelec

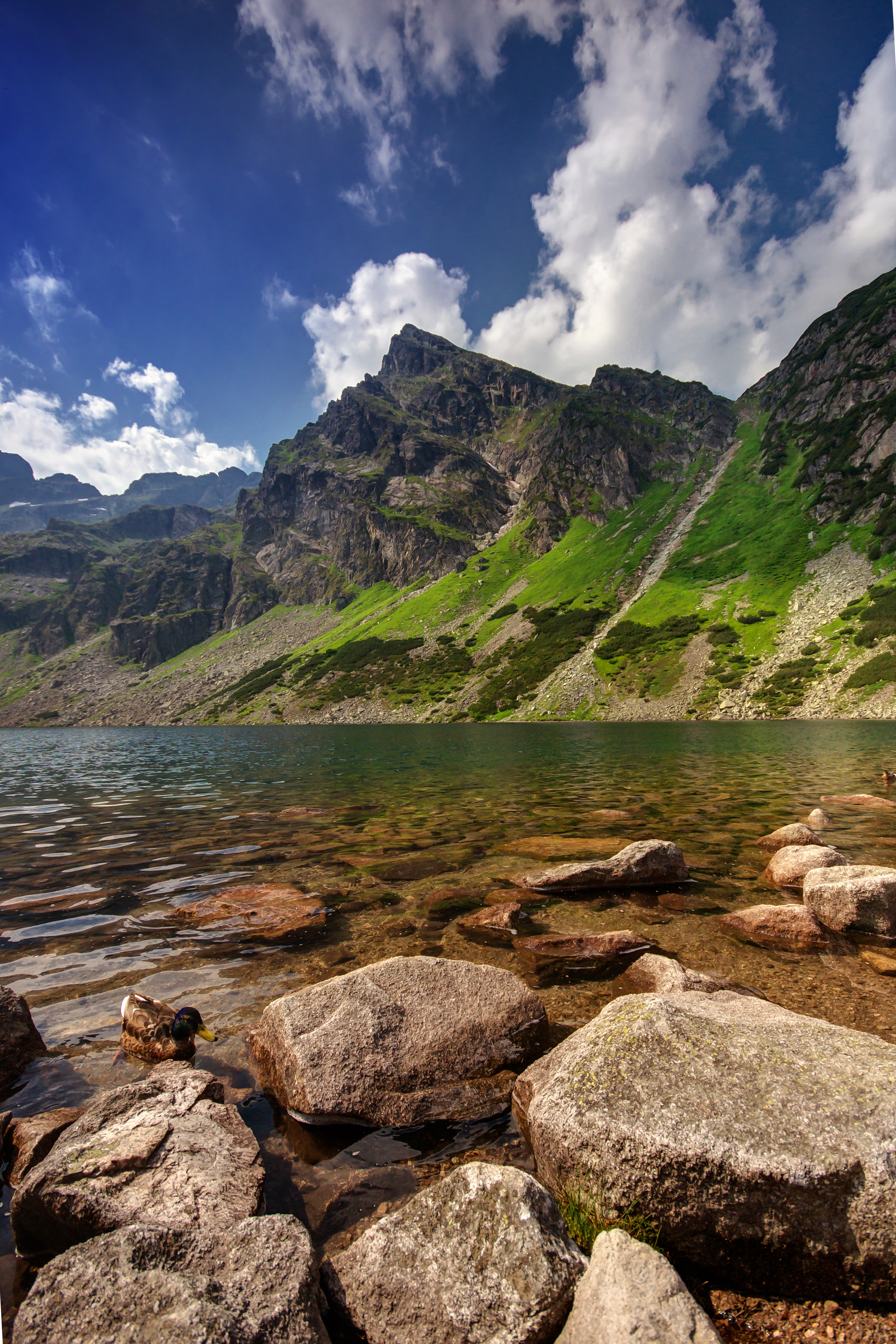
Kościelec seen from Czarny Staw Gąsienicowy

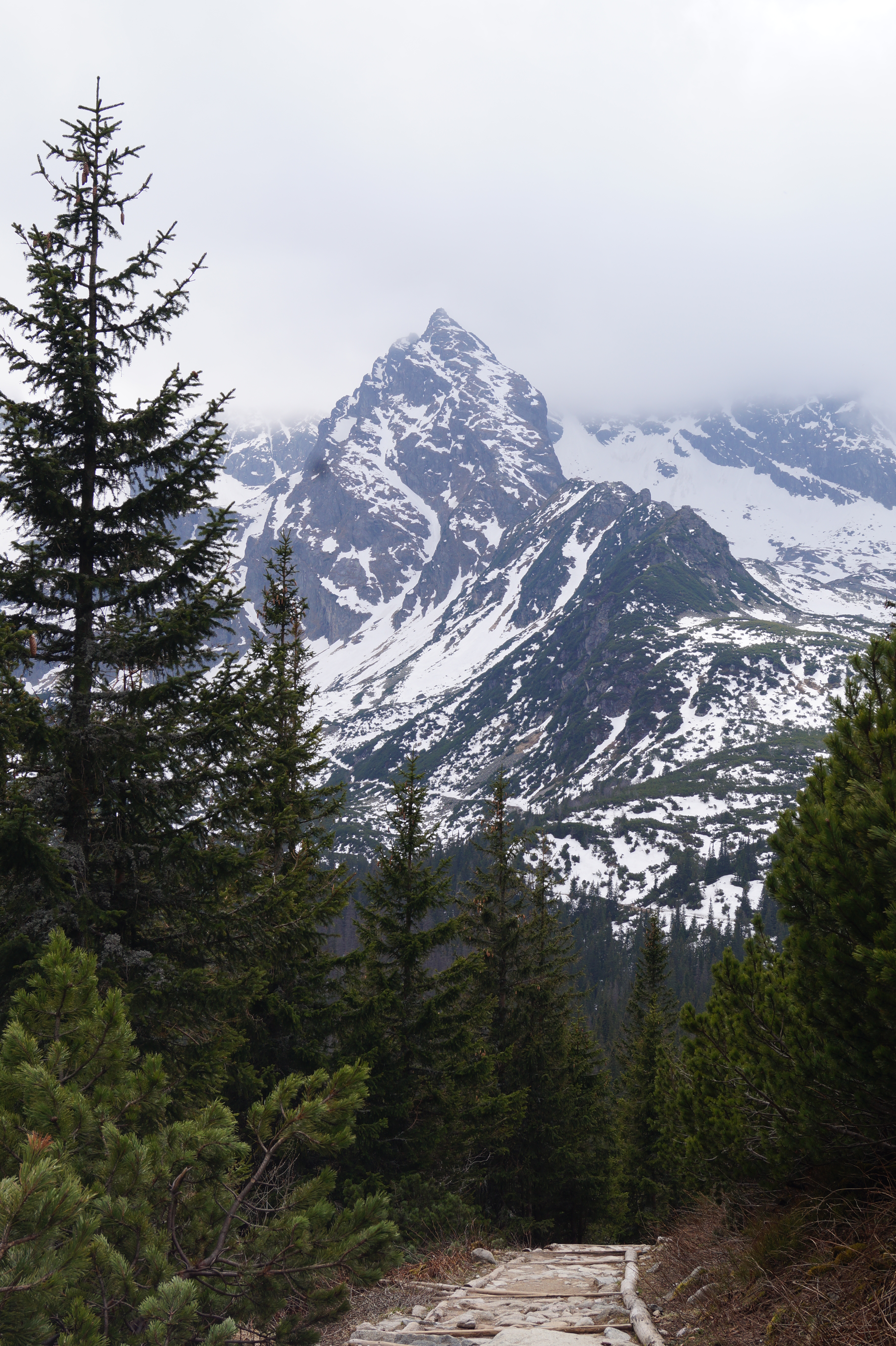
View from Królowe Rówienki
