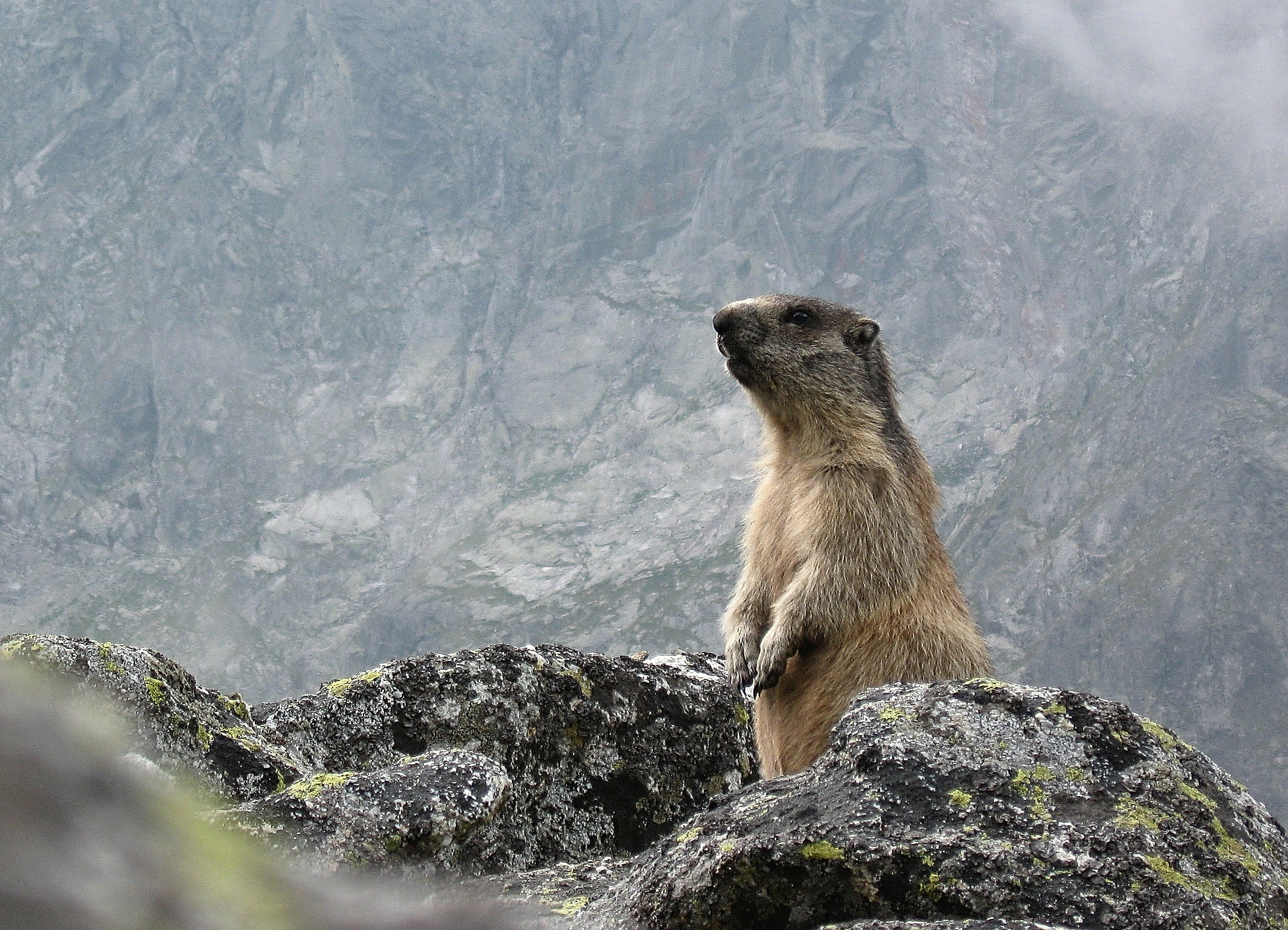

Scientific classification
- Kingdom: Animalia
- Phylum: Chordata
- Class: Mammalia
- Infraclass: Placentalia
- Order: Rodentia
- Family: Sciuridae
- Genus: Marmota
- Species: M. marmota
- Subspecies: M. m. latirostris

Trinomial name
- Marmota marmota latirostris Kratochvíl, 1961
- Distribution of Marmota marmota latirostris

= Tatra marmot =

Subspecies of a rodent

The Tatra marmot (Marmota marmota latirostris) is an endemic subspecies of marmot found in the Tatra Mountains. In the past, it was a game animal, but in the 19th century, its population drastically declined. It is a herbivore active in the summer, living in territorial family clans in the mountains from the upper montane to the alpine zone. One of the rarest vertebrates in Poland, it is subject to strict legal protection there. It is also legally protected in Slovakia. The Red List of Threatened Animals in Poland and the Polish Red Book of Animals classify the Tatra marmot as a strongly endangered subspecies (EN), while the Red List for the Carpathians in Poland designates it as "CR" – critically endangered. It is a relatively poorly researched animal.

== History of discovery and research ==
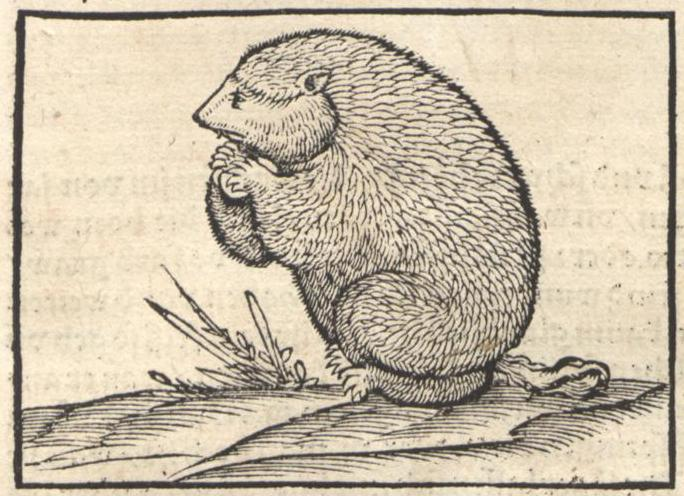
The earliest known engraving of Marmota marmota (Sebastian Münster's Cosmography or Description of the World, 1545)

The wider recognition of the marmot in Poland was influenced by the slow progress of settlement in the Tatra region, dating back to the privilege granted by Bolesław V the Chaste in 1255 to the Cistercian Abbey of Szczyrzyc: We also grant to the abbot: free hunting, all in the surrounding forests up to the mountains called Tatras. Historical accounts mention that over time, a group of hunters specializing in marmot hunting emerged, known as "whistlers".

Descriptions of Tatra marmots were very modest and mostly related to their hunting value. Hungarian pastor Andreas Jonas Czirbesz wrote in 1774: The Carpathian marmot resides in the highest mountain peaks' dens in summer and winter. It feeds on roots and herbs and has fat, tasty meat. The meat, skins, and especially the fat, which had wide applications in folk medicine, were valued.

Various authors wrote about marmots: in 1719, teacher Georg Buchholtz; in 1721, Polish naturalist and Jesuit Gabriel Rzączyński; in 1750, Gdańsk naturalist Jacob Theodor Klein; and in 1779, Polish naturalist and clergyman Jan Krzysztof Kluk mentioned "whistlers" in the Carpathians. Marmots were hunted almost without restrictions until around 1868, and on the Hungarian side of the Tatras until 1883 when regulations protecting this species were introduced.

In 1865, the first description of marmot biology was published. The author of the work About the Marmot was Maksymilian Nowicki – co-founder of the Polish Tatra Society, researcher of Tatra fauna and flora, and a pioneer of nature conservation in Poland. Nowicki, using the name Arctomys (Greek: ἄρκτος, romanized: arktos – bear, and Latin: mus – mouse, rat) as the generic name for marmots, used the term "little bear mouse," while Ludwik Zejszner, writing at the same time, used the term "bear mouse": this peculiar little animal resembles two other creatures, with a head similar to a mouse, and the rest of the body like a bear, covered with long hair similar to martens. Highlanders call it a marmot because of its special barking, as the individual barking sounds are so drawn out that they bear a great resemblance to whistling... The marmot makes very long burrows in the Tatra hollows, lining them with moss and grass. Like many animals, it undergoes hibernation. At the end of summer, it stores numerous root supplies in its burrows and, having fattened up excessively, falls asleep in this winter abode, only waking up completely emaciated in the spring.

== Systematics and evolution ==
Belonging to the family Sciuridae, the species Marmota marmota began to inhabit European territories already in the Pleistocene. It occurred over a vast area – from present-day Belgium and the shores of the English Channel to the Pannonian Basin. In the Holocene, with the warming climate, marmots had to choose more favorable locations. The moderate warmth of forested areas was not suitable for them, as their bodies are not well adapted to higher temperatures. They found cooler habitats in the elevated mountain ranges of Europe. Over time, they had to narrow their territories to the Alpine range and the Tatra Mountains. The separation of the Alpine population from the Carpathian one could have occurred from 15 to 50 thousand years ago, but for many years, no differences were noticed between the marmot living in the Tatras and its Alpine cousin, and both populations were treated as geographically separated locations of the same species.

In the late 1950s and early 1960s, Czechoslovak scientists undertook comparative studies. For this purpose, on 31 May 1961, a marmot was shot from a colony in Wielki Żleb Krywański. The holotype studies were conducted by Josef Kratochvíl, a zoologist from the agricultural university in Brno, who found significant differences in the structure of the nasal bones compared to representatives of Alpine populations. After conducting additional comparisons of the results of cranial measurements of the skulls of ten Tatra marmots (selected from 16 obtained for study) and 40 marmots from the Alps (27 skulls were personally examined, and the measurement data of 13 were the result of Gerrit Miller's work from 1912), Kratochvíl concluded that there was a regularity in the comparative group, namely, that the anterior, facial part of the nasal bone was significantly wider and longer in Tatra marmots than in animals from the Alps. Additionally, he found that marmots living in the Tatras are smaller than their cousins and have slightly different fur coloration. Ultimately, Kratochvíl classified marmots from the Tatras as a separate subspecies, M. marmota latirostris, while marmots from the Alpine population were designated as M. marmota marmota. Some zoologists question whether the observed differences could be merely manifestations of individual variability within the small population. However, genetic studies have not yet been conducted to settle this matter.

=== Etymology ===
The generic name Marmota may derive from Gallo-Romance languages, meaning "murmuring" or "purring", or from Latin, being associated with the term mus montanus, which translates to "mountain mouse". The subspecies epithet latirostris originates from two Latin words: the element lati– comes from Latin lātus, meaning "wide", and –rostris from Latin rōstrum, referring to the nose or beak, and together it can be translated as "broad-nosed". The epithet refers to the flattened and wider facial part of the nasal bone (os nasale) of the animal compared to representatives of the Alpine population.

== Morphology ==
The Tatra marmot is one of the largest rodents in Europe. It is similar in size to a domestic cat, with a massive torso. Its length, including the head, ranges from 45 cm to 65 cm (although another source by the same author provides a range of 40–60 cm). In spring, the body mass of adult males ranges from 2.7 to 3.4 kg, while females weigh between 2.5 and 3.0 kg. During the season from spring to autumn, marmots start to consume more calories, taking in more carbohydrates from grass seeds, and their brown adipose tissue significantly expands, creating an energy reserve for the approaching hibernation period. Consequently, the body mass of marmots begins to increase noticeably during this period and can reach over 6 kg by autumn, with over 2 kg attributed to fat tissue. The fluffy tail measures between 13 and 17 cm.

The primary fur consists of long, strong, and thick guard hairs, with the down hair being dense, composed of shorter, woolly, and slightly twisted hairs. The fur color is described as reddish-brown transitioning to dark brown-black. The hair coloration is highly varied, with black or dark brown dominating at the base, while shades of fawn, black, or reddish prevail higher up, fading to fawn or beige at the ends. The fur on the abdomen is lighter, ranging from light beige to yellowish. The head is covered with shorter hair, usually dark, black, or gray, with a light patch between the eyes. The muzzle is lighter, with a grayish tone, while the tail is blackish-brown, with a black tip. The fur of young individuals under one year old is notably darker and fluffier. Moulting typically occurs once a year, around June. Females, weakened by nursing new offspring, may have incomplete fur, and moulting may be delayed by about four weeks. As they age, the fur becomes more twisted and bushy. Older marmots, especially after hibernation, may have areas of thinning fur on their backs and tails.

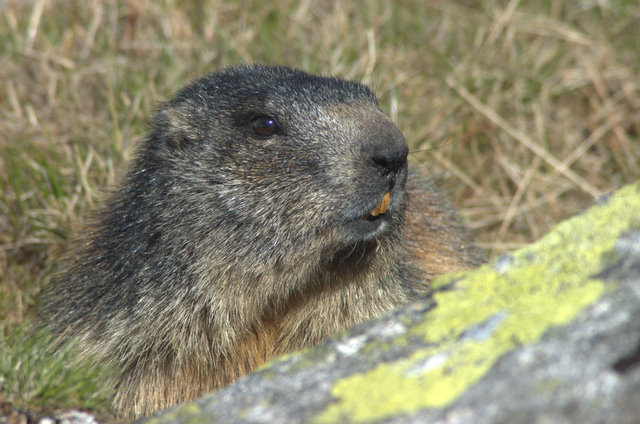
Head of a marmot

Five rows of whiskers, measuring up to 8 cm in length, grow on the sides of the marmot's muzzle, with sensory hairs also distributed on the eyebrows. Marmots do not have sweat glands. The forehead is flat and wide, with short (2–2.5 cm), densely furred ears almost entirely concealed in the head's fur. The eyes are small and black. The front paws are short, robust, and dexterous, equipped with four hairy toes ending in claws measuring from 2 to 2.5 cm, which serve as useful tools for digging burrows and holding food. The muscular hind limbs end in five toes with sharp claws.

The external surface of the incisors is covered with hard enamel with longitudinal grooves, whose color changes with the animal's age, starting white in juveniles and darkening to orange and nearly brown with age. The posterior, concave surface of the incisors is made up of brittle dentin. The incisor's occlusal arrangement is scissor-like. The dentition for marmots is: $\tfrac{1 0 2 3}{1 0 1 3}$.

In females, there are five pairs of mammary glands.

Gallery of sample fur coloration of Tatra marmots

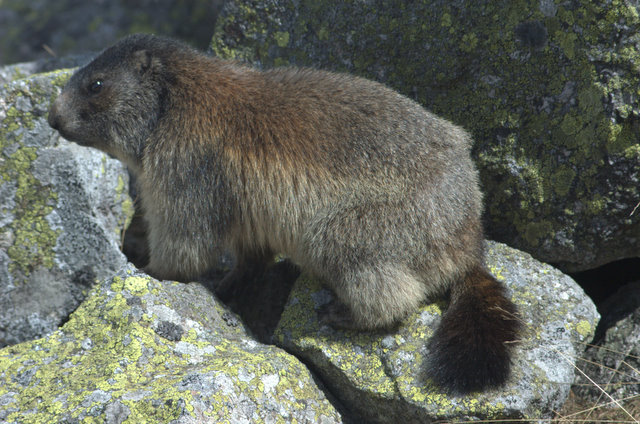

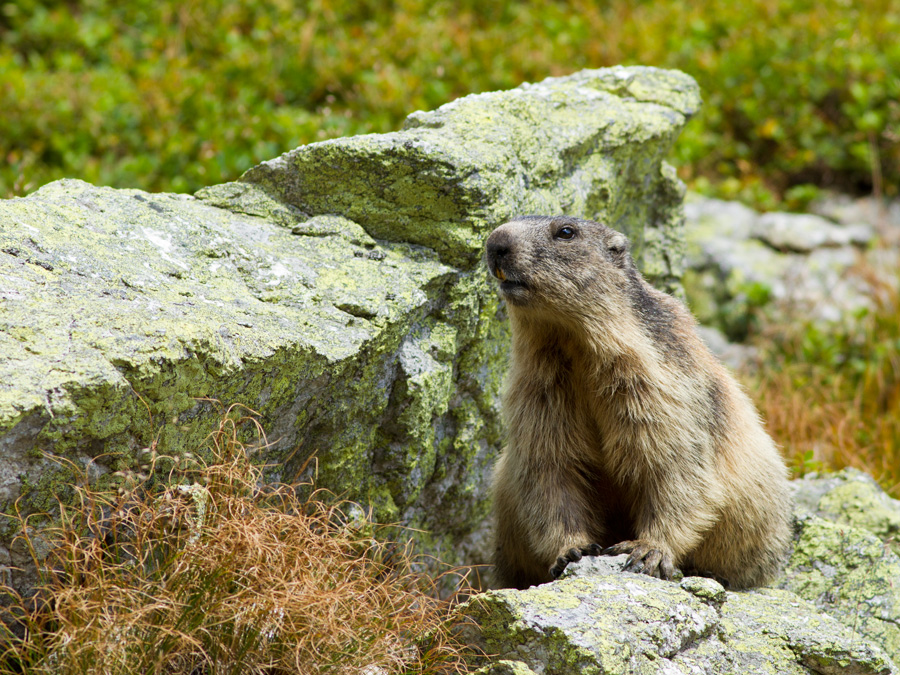
Coloration of the marmot from the Račkov Zadok valley

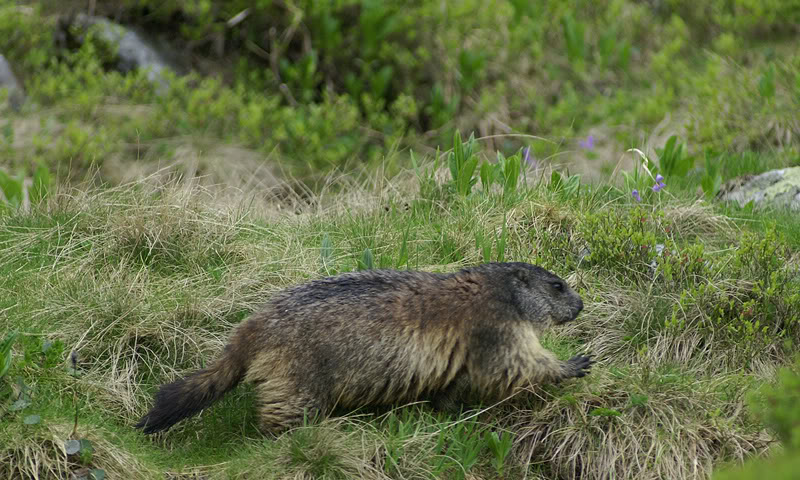
Marmot in Štvrté Rohačske

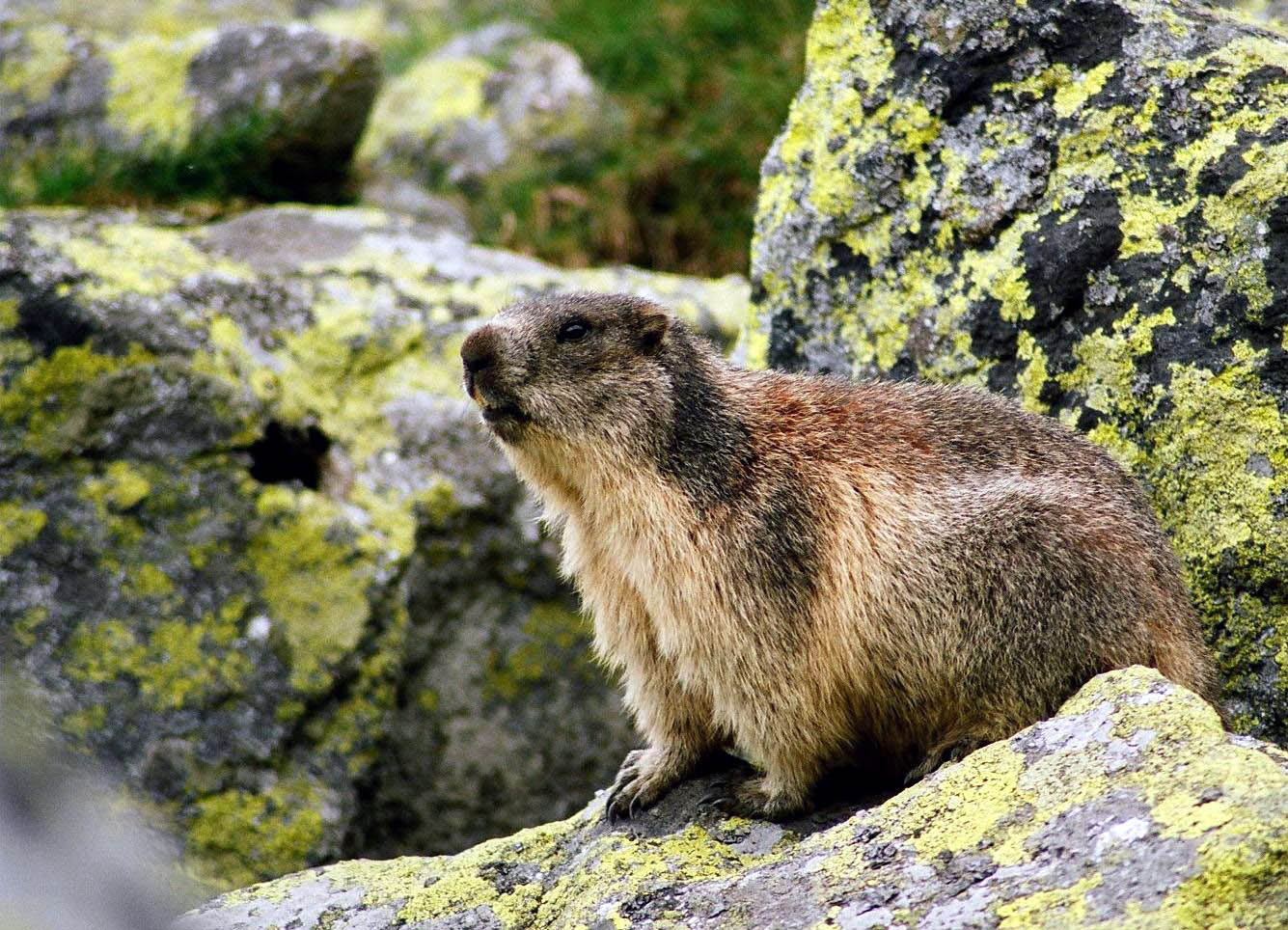
Marmot in Veľká Studená dolina

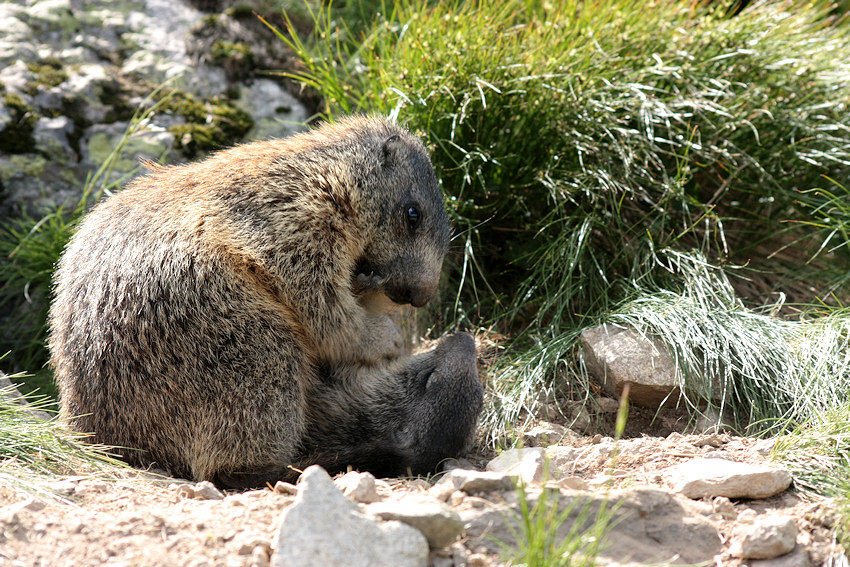
Light fur of a young marmot

=== Morphological comparison to the alpine marmot ===
The main feature that allowed the Tatra subspecies of marmot to be distinguished was the dimensions of the facial part of the nasal bone:

==== Craniological comparisons (Josef Kratochvíl, 1961) ====
Cranial feature	alpine marmot	Tatra marmot
Width of the skull behind the orbits (mm)	19.3	18.5
Length of the nasal bone (mm)	39.4	41.7
Width of the nasal bone (mm)	17.4	19.2

Furthermore, Tatra marmots are characterized by lighter fur and have a grayish-brown coloration, while the alpine subspecies has a darker brown coloration, often with a reddish hue. M. marmota latirostris has a smaller body mass. However, sources do not provide details of this difference.

Despite differences in the habitats of both subspecies (alpine marmots occupy locations at altitudes up to 3200 m above sea level), no differences have been observed in behavior and way of life.

== Lifestyle ==
The Tatra marmot is a diurnal animal with territorial and social behavior. It is monogamous, and individual families join colonies, with the nucleus typically being a dominant pair of animals.

=== Annual life cycle ===
The annual life cycle of the marmot consists of two periods: summer activity and hibernation.

==== Summer activity ====
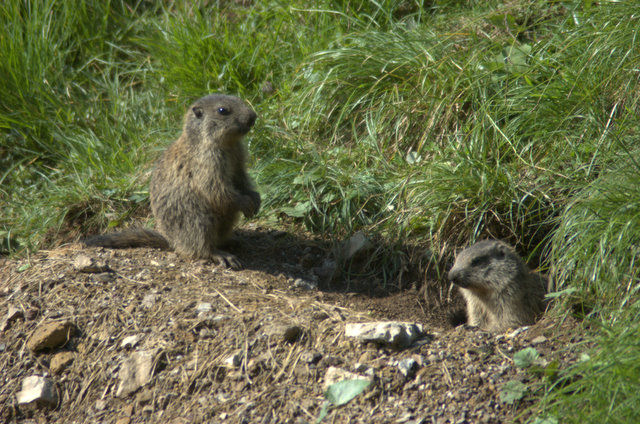
End of July – young marmots in the mountain zone in front of the burrow, where they feel more confident

The summer activity of the marmot begins around April and May and lasts until the second half of September or the first half of October. The earliest emergence of marmots on the surface has been observed on April 22, while the latest on May 10. This period lasts 139–158 days (or 139–161), with an average of 148 (or 150.7).

The first spring activity after awakening from winter hibernation is associated with the mating season. the estrous cycle typically occurs in the second decade of May. Mating takes place both inside and outside the burrow. Gestation lasts about 33 days, and the young are born in the second decade of June. Usually, from one to six offspring are born, most commonly from two to three. They remain under the care of the female in the burrow until the second half of July. They start consuming solid food at the age of eight weeks. They will only become independent after three to four years when they reach sexual maturity.

The beginning of summer activity is also marked by the search for new locations. Marmots migrate up to a distance of 3000 meters.

During the summer period, marmots spend their time foraging (43.9%) and patrolling the territory (40.3%). Other activities such as moving, gathering winter supplies, digging and tidying burrows, playing, hygiene, typically account for only 8.9% of their time. Spending time inside the burrow during the day constitutes an average of 6.9%.

There are three different types of contacts between marmots. The locomotor contact is the most common, followed by acoustic and visual contact.

==== Hibernation ====
At the end of September and beginning of October, the period of summer activity ends for the Tatra marmot, and the hibernation period begins. Changes in the environment signal the marmot's organism. The air temperature drops, the days become shorter, and the vegetation, which serves as food, becomes scarce. Marmots curl up into a ball and collectively arrange themselves at the bottom of the winter burrow chamber. Metabolic processes slow down, allowing the body temperature to decrease from 37.7 °C to 8–10 °C, which is about 2–3 °C lower than the temperature inside the burrow. In exceptional situations, the body temperature may drop to 3–5 °C. Respiratory rate decreases from 16 to as low as 2–3 (or 4–5) breaths per minute, as oxygen consumption during hibernation decreases by about thirty times, and the heart rate decreases from 220 to 30 contractions per minute. Other sources specify the frequency of heart ventricular contractions in the summer period as 130, decreasing during hibernation to 15 per minute.

Young marmots usually hibernate in the middle of the family, enveloped by older individuals, which helps them survive the burden of winter sleep more easily. Adult marmots accumulate more fat for this period. They also maintain a slightly higher body temperature.

During hibernation, the marmot wakes up approximately every 3 weeks. The awakening lasts for about 12–30 hours, after which the animal returns to sleep. The trigger for awakening may be a decrease in the temperature inside the burrow to 0 °C. Too many awakenings during hibernation are very energetically costly for the marmot's organism. During these short awakenings, the marmot's body temperature rises to about 34 °C, sharply increasing energy expenditure, and up to 90% of the reserves accumulated in the form of brown adipose tissue are consumed. In the case of prolonged winter, the organism may become excessively depleted, leading to the death of the animal. During hibernation, the marmot's body mass significantly decreases. Hibernation lasts for 201–227 days, 215 on average.

=== Social structure ===
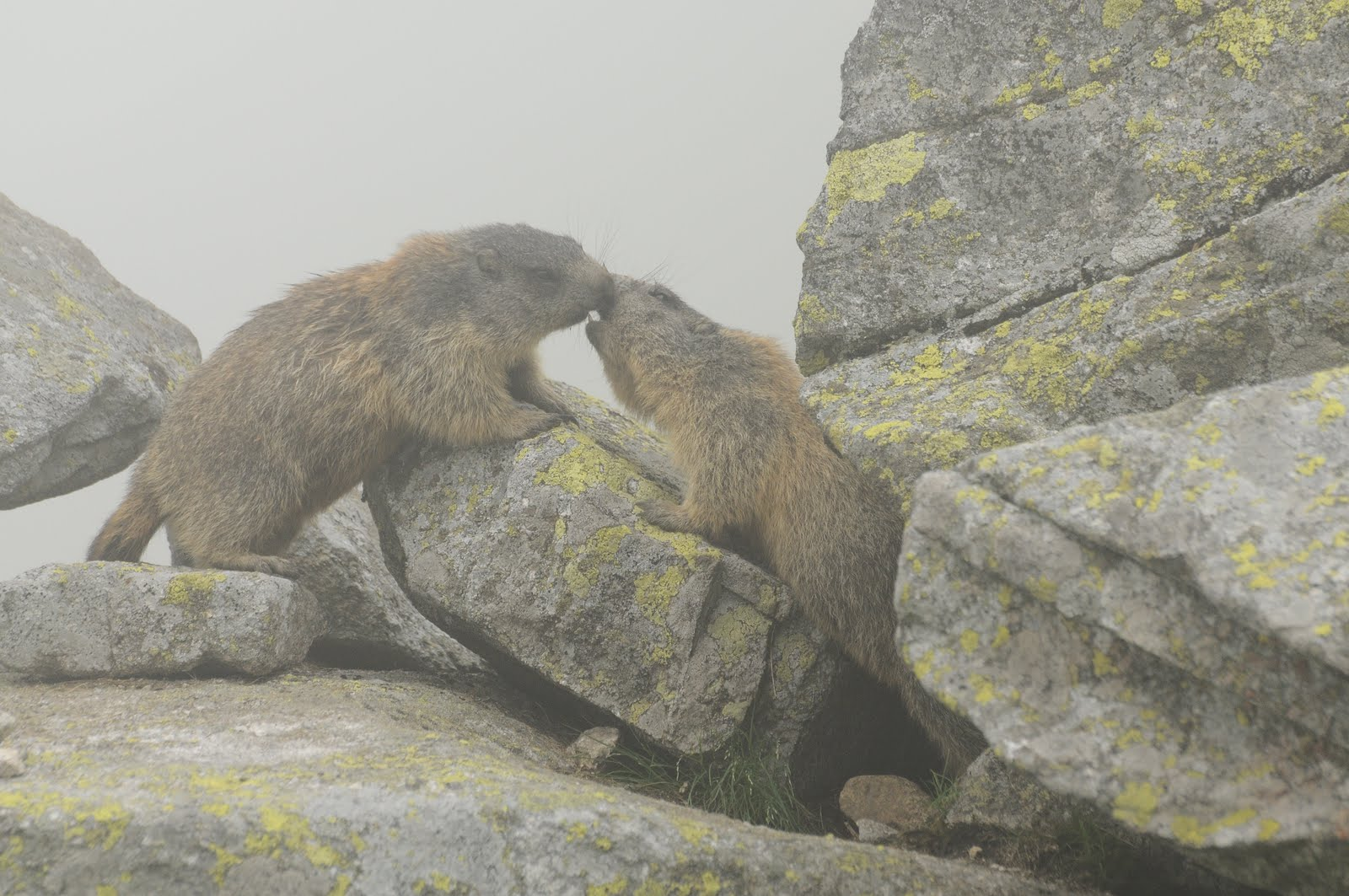
Meeting of two marmots in Dolinka Kozia

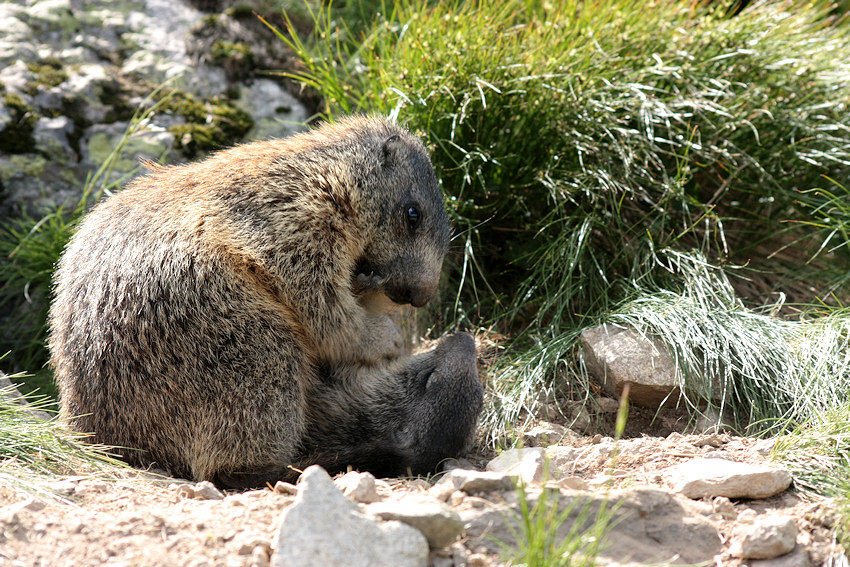
Young marmots fighting on the slope of Volovec

A family colony can consist of several individuals – the dominant pair, their offspring from different years, and adopted individuals. According to former director of Tatra National Park, Wojciech Gąsienica-Byrcyn, several marmot families can comprise a colony. Marmot territorialism manifests in the daily need for the dominant male to patrol the boundaries demonstratively, systematically marking the territory with its scent. This is most likely done through secretions from glands located in the anal region, cheek glands, and glands in the paw pads. The marked territory is defended by the male against individuals from neighboring colonies. The first warnings are visual signals. The male raises its fur and waves its tail vertically. If the warning is not enough, it leads to a fight, where decisive wounds are inflicted using incisors. If the fight is evenly matched and neither male surrenders or flees, the brawl can last even the whole day. Aggressive defense is mainly directed towards foreign adult males. Young individuals can visit even the center of a foreign colony without fear. They are seen as adoption candidates for the colony without posing a threat to the dominant male's position.

The social nature of marmot colonies is evident in their collective actions. They build burrows together, sleep together, and help each other groom. Young ones play together in groups, wrestling, standing in a "pillar" position, or chasing each other around the colony area. During a meeting, marmots greet each other by touching noses and sniffing. Sometimes, they also show excitement by moving their tails up and down. Reproduction is also subject to specific rules and is reserved only for the dominant pair. Mature individuals in the colony must adhere to the leader in this regard. Periodic battles for leadership may result in the overthrow of the dominant male. He is then expelled from the colony, and the victor may sometimes kill the loser's offspring to solidify his power.

=== Sounds ===
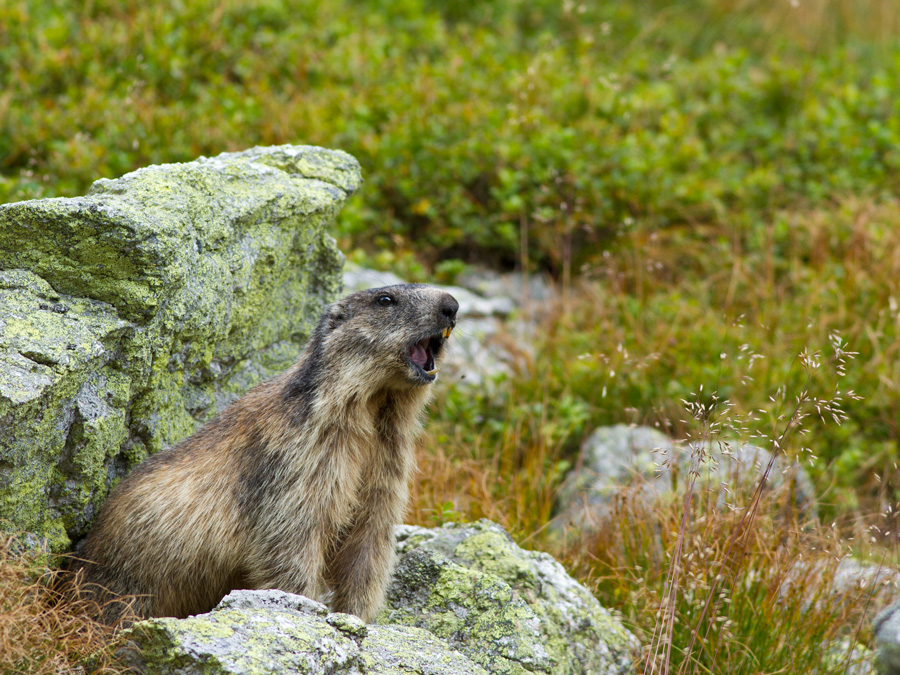
Whistle, or rather scream, of a marmot in Račkov Zadok

Marmots also communicate with each other by whistling or rather screaming, as the sound emanates from their wide-open mouths. The primary function of screaming is to warn colony members of danger. Several different levels of alarm whistles can be distinguished. The presence of a human, dog, or fox is signaled by a series of moderately intense whistles – then marmots swiftly move to the nearest burrow and observe from its entrance how events unfold. A series of whistles usually also discourages a fox, who is aware that after hearing the alarm signals, no marmot will become its prey. The greatest threat, such as the appearance of an eagle, is signaled by a single sharp whistle. Then, marmots flee without hesitation and hide in their burrows.

Marmots also emit other sounds, which can be described as squeaks or murmurs. These do not convey warning information.

== Geographical distribution ==
The range of the Marmota marmota species spans between 44° and 49° N. Natural populations have survived in two mountain ranges: the Alps and the Tatra Mountains. The Tatra Mountains represent the northern range of the species (49° 14" N). The Alps are inhabited by the subspecies Marmota marmota marmota, while Marmota marmota latirostris is an endemic species living in Poland and Slovakia. The vertical distribution range of Tatra marmots' habitats ranges from 1380 to 2050 meters above sea level, or according to other sources: in the Polish Tatra Mountains from 1750 to 1950 meters above sea level (with an average of 1870 meters above sea level), and in the entire Tatras massif from 1380 to 2330 meters above sea level.

In the main Tatra range, 207 main burrows were inventoried, and in the Low Tatras, 46 burrows were counted, or according to other sources, 40 burrows. The population of Tatra marmots on the Polish side of the Tatras was estimated at 150–200 individuals, while the total population in the entire Tatras is less than 1000 individuals.

The issue of precisely determining the locations of M. marmota latirostris in the Tatra Mountains encounters certain difficulties. While it is easy to establish that the autochthonous subspecies of the Tatra marmot occurs in the Western and Eastern Tatras, the origin of the marmots occurring in the Slovak Low Tatras (with the highest peak being Ďumbier) separated from the main massif of the Tatras by the Liptov Basin is not clear. Although Ludwik Zejszner claimed that marmots were already living in the area of Solisko and Ďumbier in 1845, some researchers believe that the population in the Low Tatras is introduced from other parts of the Tatras. The fact of the 19th-century introduction in the area of Kráľova hoľa in the eastern part of the Low Tatras is reported by many researchers. Some even specify a specific time frame for it, around 1859–1867. Others believe that the marmots from the western part of the Low Tatras constitute a post-glacial population because, in their opinion, marmots would not be able to penetrate through the forested areas of the central part of the Low Tatras from previous introductions. In 1961, an expert on Tatra fauna, zoologist from the research station of the national park, Milič Blahout, wrote directly about the introduction of marmots from the Austrian Alps released in the Low Tatras between 1859 and 1867. Barbara Chovancová, who leads the marmot and chamois protection program in the Slovak Tatra National Park (TANAP), has no doubts that introductions were carried out twice in the Ďumbier area of the Low Tatras. Alpine marmots were released there in 1859, and in 1867, two pairs of marmots from the High Tatras were also released. If this were indeed the case, hybridization between representatives of both marmot subspecies could have occurred. Slovak authors mention a possible gene exchange between populations from the western and eastern parts of the Low Tatras. However, most believe that only Marmota marmota latirostris inhabits the Low Tatras. Kratochvíl proposed a hypothesis regarding the potential historical introduction confusion. He pointed out that historical information about marmots in the Carpathians could refer to populations still living in the 19th century in the Carpathians in Romania and Ukrainian Zakarpattia. However, there is a lack of reliable cranial or genetic studies that would resolve the issue of the origin of the populations in the Slovak Low Tatras.

Data about historical locations of marmots in the Tatra Mountains was derived from extensive local nomenclature referring to marmot habitats: Svišťový štít, Svišťová dolina, Svišťovský potok, Świstówka Roztocka, Świstówka Waksmundzka, Malá Svišťovka, Veľká Svišťovka, Svišťové sedlo, Świstowa Grań with Svišťové veže included, Świstowa Rówień, Svišťové plieska, Svišťový roh, Svišťová kôpka, Svišťový priechod, Svišťový chrbát, Sedlo pod Svišťovkou, Svišťovka, Nižná svišťová jaskyňa, Vyšná svišťová jaskyňa. These names appear in literature only in the 17th century, but Gabriel Rzączyński already in 1721 mentioned, "is found in the Alps and Carpathian mountains in a valley named Świszcza" (probably referring to Svišťová dolina).

In the last decade, a small number of marmots from the population in the Slovak Tatras were introduced into the Ukrainian part of the Eastern Carpathians.

=== Fossil traces of occurrence ===
Fossil traces of marmot occurrence have been found in Moravia, and in Poland in the vicinity of Jasło.

== Ecology ==
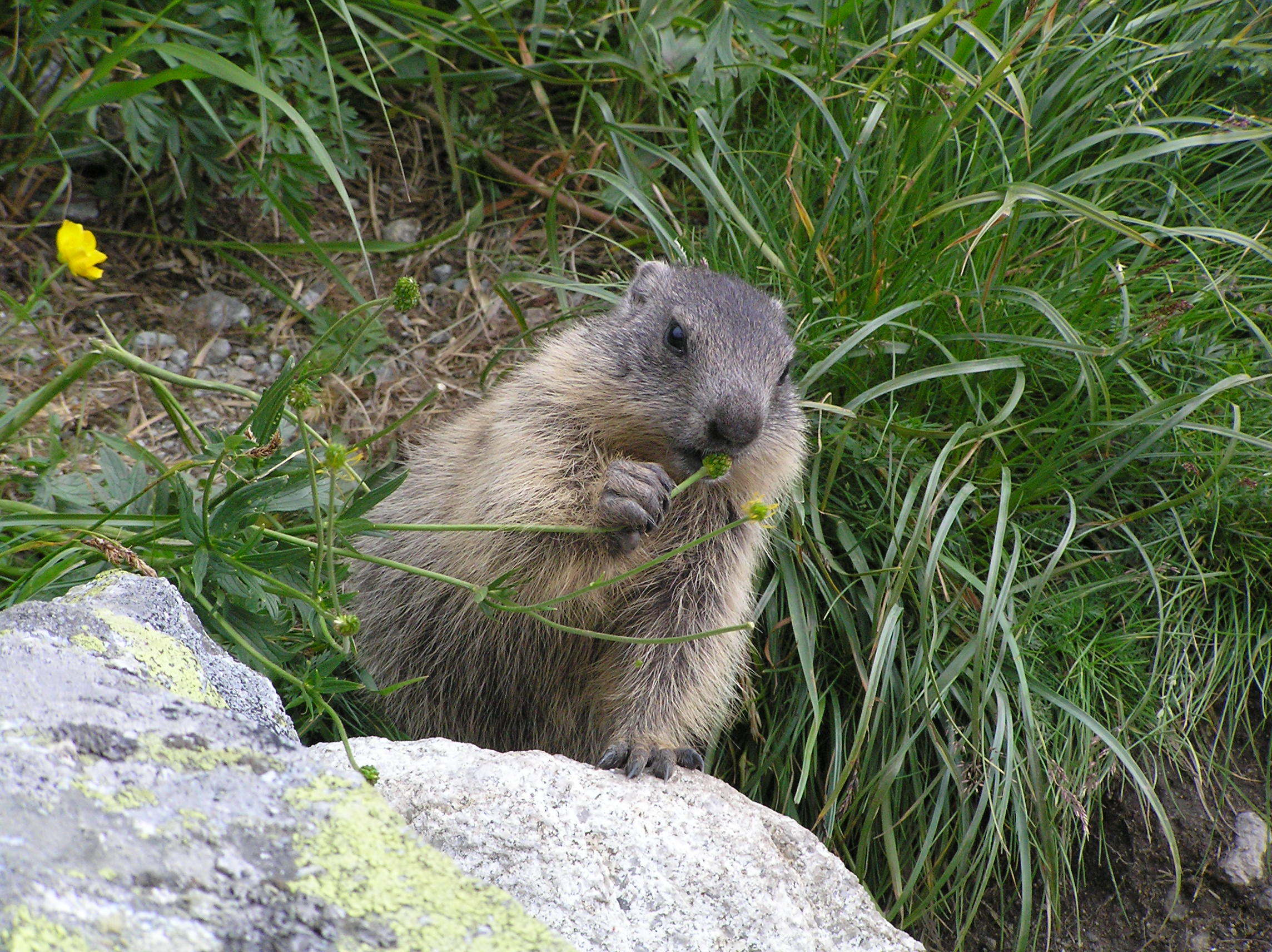
Tatra marmot during a meal

The Tatra marmot is a herbivore. The main components of its diet include: herbaceous vegetation, shrubs and prostrate shrubs, roots, and tubers. The composition of its diet changes with the periods of vegetation in the Tatra Mountains. Favorite spring dishes include grasses, and in summer, the marmot most willingly eats spotted gentian, Luzula alpinopilosa, alpine coltsfoot, alpine avens, Mutellina purpurea, and Poa granitica. More than 40 species of consumed plants are mentioned; among them are alpine bartsia, wood cranesbill, Oreochloa disticha, European blueberry, Veratrum lobelianum, Campanula alpina, Campanula tatrae, Ranunculus pseudomontanus, large white buttercup, alpine hawkweed, brown clover, colorful fescue, Valeriana sambucifolia, Valeriana tripteris, Thymus alpestris, Thymus pulcherrimus, Adenostyles alliariae, dandelions, Solidago alpestris, Doronicum austriacum, Doronicum clusii, golden cinquefoil, Anthyllis vulneraria subsp. vulneraria, bistort, alpine bistort, golden root, alpine pasqueflower, alpine sainfoin, Juncus trifidus, Rumex alpestris, wavy hair-grass, eyebright, Soldanella carpatica, alpine meadow-grass, narcissus anemone and round-headed rampion. An adult marmot consumes about 1.5 kg of food daily. Water requirements are met by consuming juicy plants.

The Tatra marmot is vulnerable to attacks from predators such as the golden eagle, gray wolf, Eurasian lynx, and red fox. The mere presence of humans also causes pressure and changes in behavior. In relation to humans, the marmot maintains a safe escape distance of several dozen to several hundred meters. In relation to predators, this distance is significantly extended and can be several hundred meters.

=== Habitat ===
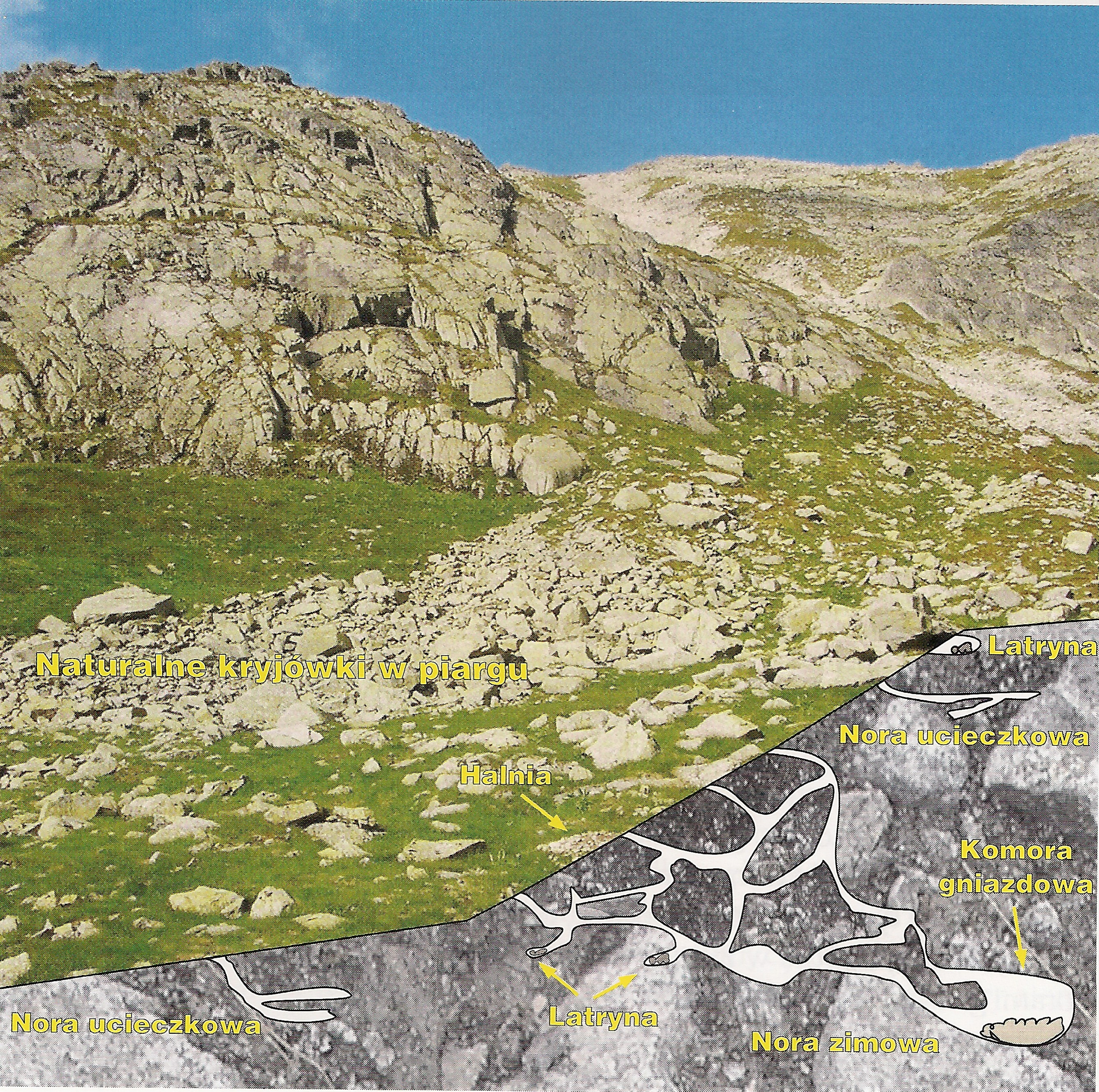
Biotope of Tatra marmot and burrow layout

The entire population of the Tatra marmot is located within the territory of the Slovak Tatra National Park (TANAP) and the Polish Tatra National Park, so the habitat has a primitive character.

The typical habitat of M. marmota latirostris consists of Tatran areas in the altitudinal zonation: alpine zone, subalpine zone (grassy fragments), mountain zone (open spaces), and to a limited extent, foothill zone, with an average annual temperature ranging from -3 to +3 °C. The marmot prefers sunny places. The slope angle of the mountain habitats does not exceed 40°. The marmot enjoys the surroundings of rocks, which provide a good observation point and can also serve as shelter for hiding. The soil must have sufficient thickness to allow the digging of a burrow.

In the Tatras, the upper limit of vertical distribution of habitats is determined by orographic conditions. Above 2300 m above sea level, the low thickness of the soil basically prevents the digging of burrows. The lowest recorded site was inventoried at an altitude of 1350 m above sea level.

The central part of the colony typically occupies an area of about 2.5 hectares. The surface area of the territory depends, of course, on the vegetation coverage and the size of the colony. However, most authors report much smaller surface areas occupied by the colony: Peter Bopp 2000–2500 m^{2}, Josef Kratochvíl 7900 m^{2}, Milíč Blahout 2500–3600 m^{2}, Dymitr I. Bibikov 500–4500 m^{2}. The maximum occupied area can reach 2–7 hectares.

=== Burrow ===
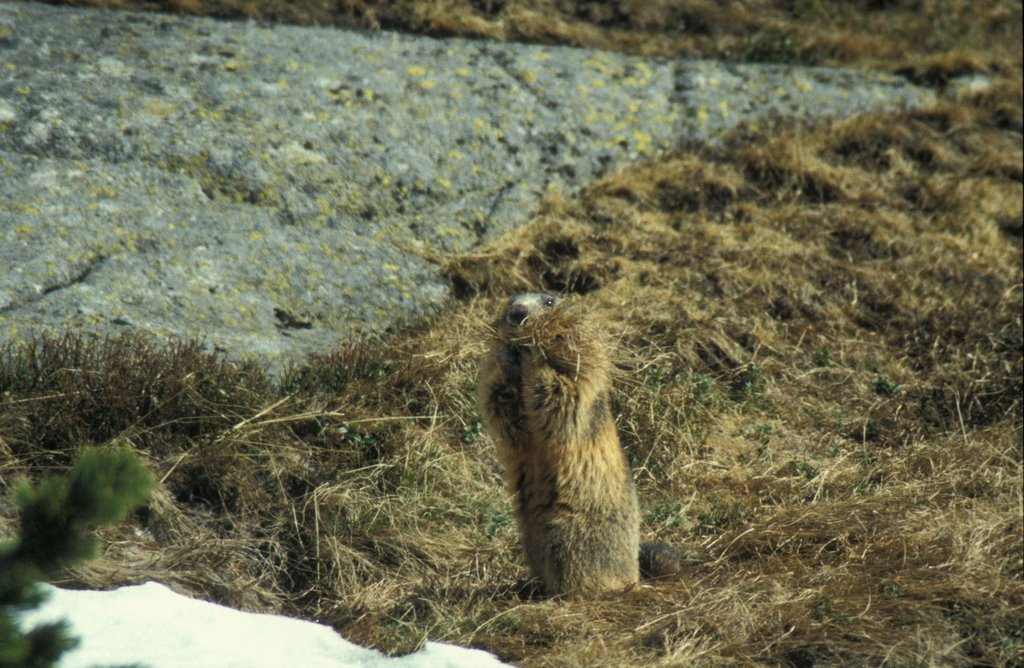
Marmot carrying hay to line the burrow chamber

The burrow is the most important habitat for the marmot, who spends the entire period of hibernation in it, and during the summer, the burrow provides shelter. Therefore, suitable soil conditions, which allow easy excavation of tunnels, largely determine the location of a given colony. Both the thickness of the soil and the arrangement of aquifers are important, as they influence the avoidance of flooding or inundation. The nesting chamber is lined with dried grasses from the local vegetation. The marmot utilizes Juncus trifidus, Oreochloa disticha, fescue, reed grass, moss and lichens. The gathered lining is not used by marmots as food. It has also been observed that marmots collect tissues or fabrics discarded by tourists for this purpose. Marmots maintain cleanliness of their burrows, so each burrow is equipped with a latrine, which is created in alcoves along the side tunnels. Only there does the marmot relieve itself. Similarly, local marmot latrines can also be found outside formal burrows. They are created temporarily on the family's territory, in short tunnels, or in depressions under rocks.

==== Hibernation burrow ====
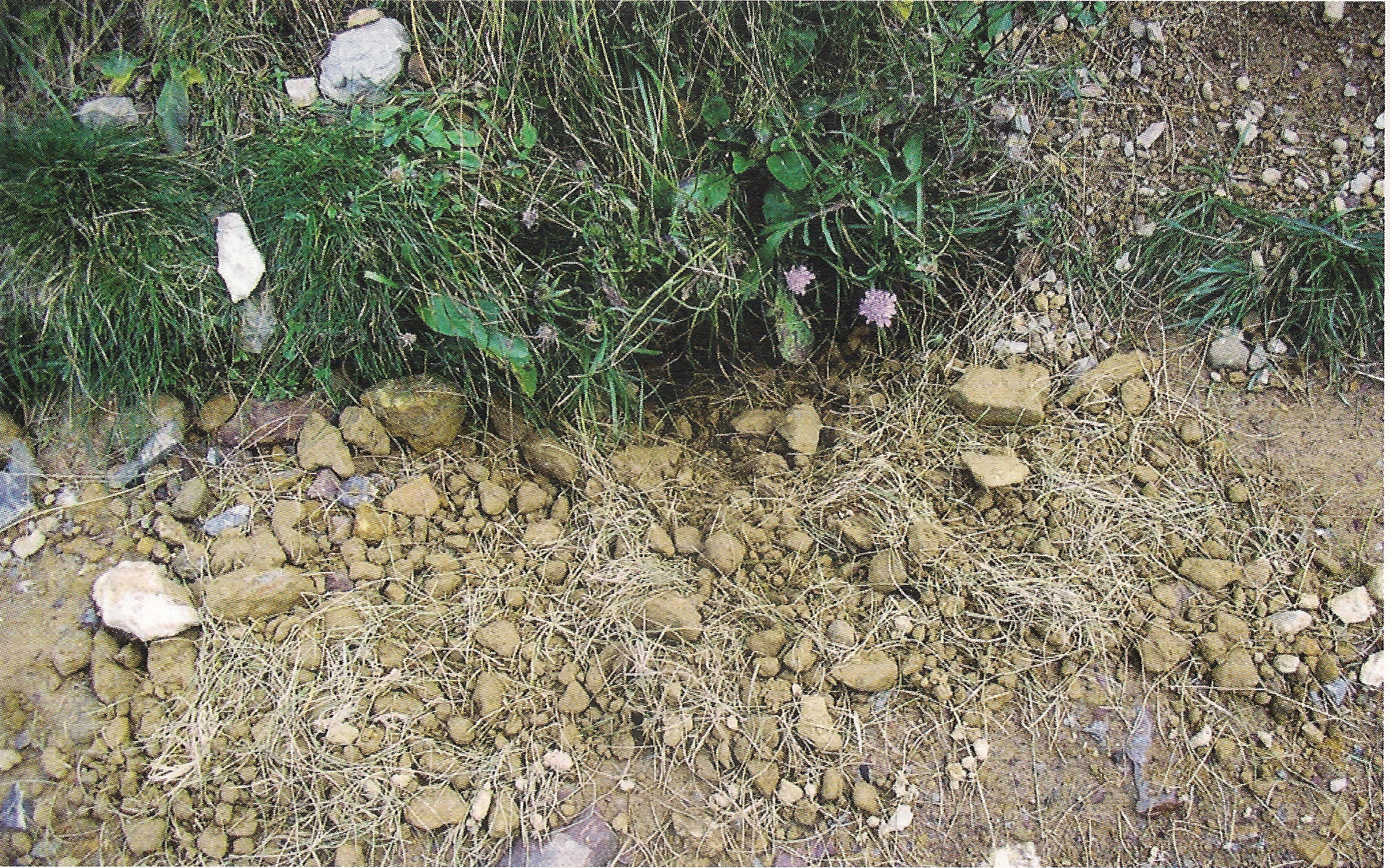
Closed exit of a burrow

The hibernation burrow plays a crucial role in the life of these animals. A marmot family spends an average of 215 days per year in it, hence the term "main burrow". It can also serve as the center of a marmot's life. The winter burrow consists of an entire system of branching tunnels, which can have a total length of over 10 meters. The tunnels have an oval shape with a diameter of 15–18 cm and are relatively shallow, but below the frost line – typically 1.2 meters below ground level. The central chamber of the burrow is located even up to 7 meters deep, accessed by several tunnels allowing the use of distant entrances. The chamber is abundantly lined with hay collected by the animals. To prepare one bedroom for winter, these rodents can use up to 15 kg of grass. Near the entrances, there is usually an earth mound formed by the removal of material during tunneling. The tunnels are equipped with small widenings, which allow family members to pass each other going in opposite directions. Before winter, the entrances to the burrows are carefully sealed by the marmots from the inside with packed earth, stones, and feces.

Each burrow houses a family hibernating, usually consisting of 4 to 10 marmots. In the past, accounts from hunters indicated that they found between 2 and 15 individuals dug out from a winter burrow.

==== Summer burrow ====
The summer burrow, sometimes referred to as transitional, is a system of tunnels built for temporary use during the summer season. It is excavated more shallowly (does not need to protect from the cold of frozen ground) and has a shorter tunnel system. Sometimes, after summer, it may be deepened and used for hibernation. However, if a family uses the hibernation burrow in the summer, they do not build a separate summer burrow.

==== Escape burrow ====
The most commonly encountered underground structure of the marmot is the escape burrow, also known as emergency or rescue burrow. These are makeshift shelters from predators. Their construction is very simple – sometimes their length does not exceed 1 meter, and they are equipped with only one or two entrances and do not have many branches. The marmot tries to cover its territory with a network of such makeshift shelters. Within the area of one colony, there can be found from 16 to 20 such hiding places, and when disturbed, the animal can remain underground for several hours. The marmot tries not to stray more than 10–15 meters from the nearest shelter. Over time, even escape burrows can be expanded and elevated to a higher status.

== Tatra marmot in captivity ==
Tatra marmots are not currently bred in Polish zoos. Between 1924 and 1935, the zoo in Poznań possessed three individuals from the Polish population of M. marmota, while from 1927 onwards, the Kraków Bażantarnia (which was succeeded by the local zoo) bred four Tatra marmots. After World War II, individual specimens of this subspecies were exhibited in Czechoslovak zoos.

== Threats and conservation ==
=== Legal conservation ===
==== International law ====
- Bern Convention – annex III
- Habitats Directive – annex II and IV

==== National law ====
- Species protection in Poland – strict protection

==== Threat categories ====
- Red List of Threatened Animals in Poland – EN
- Polish Red Book of Animals – EN
- Carpathian List – EN (in Poland – CR)

IUCN classification: Marmota marmota marmota is abundant, least concerning (LC). The subspecies Marmota marmota latirostris is rare and requires strict protection. Highly endangered in Poland due to a small population.

=== Threats ===
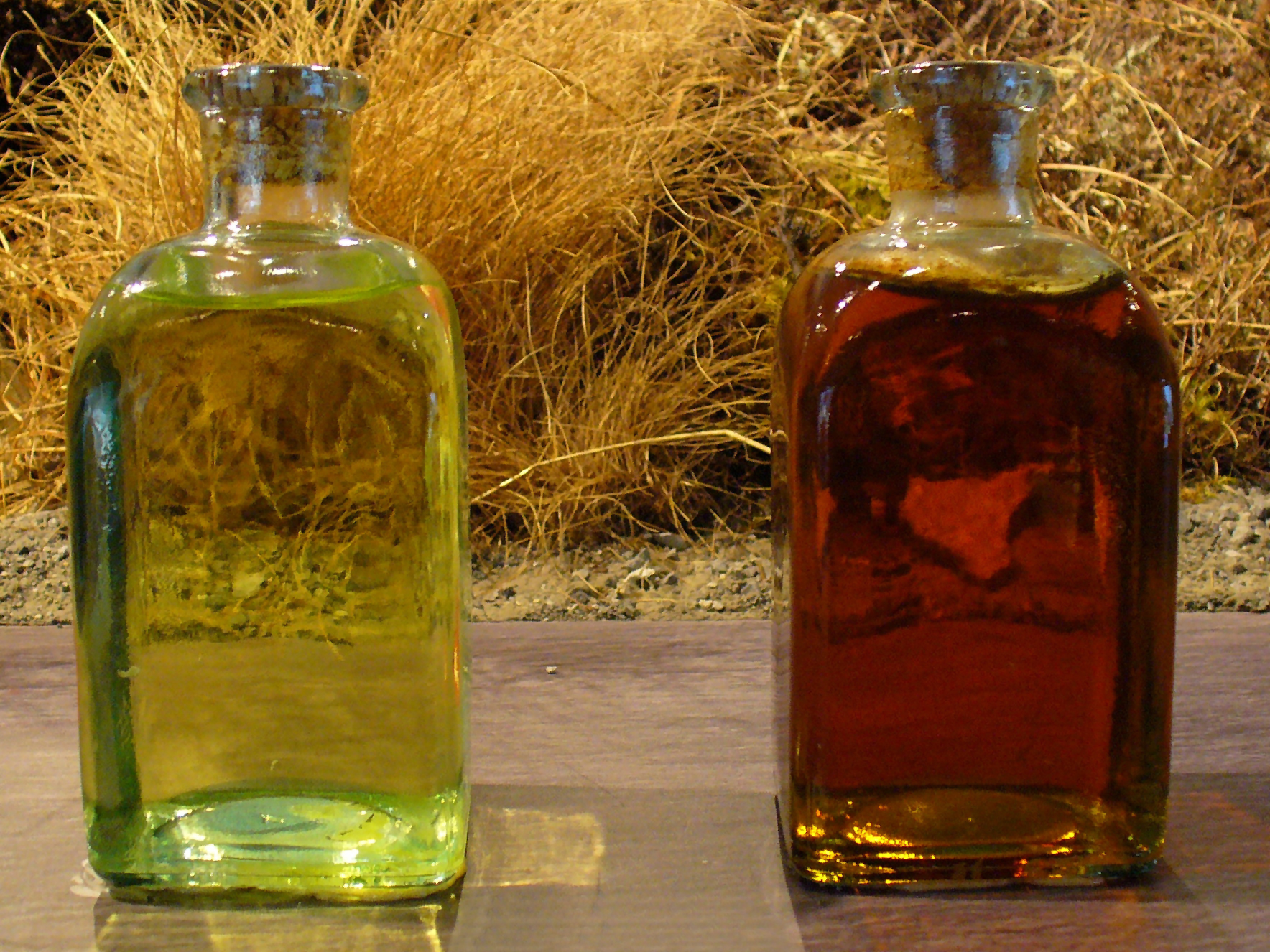
Marmot fat: from white adipose tissue and brown adipose tissue

Until the 19th century, regular hunting of marmots was conducted in the Tatra Mountains, where their skins, meat, and fat were highly sought-after commodities. There was a particularly high demand for marmot fat due to its use in traditional medicine and the widespread belief in its miraculous healing properties. Marmot fat was used both externally and internally for various purposes, including the treatment of hernias. It was also given with milk to women in labor to facilitate childbirth and as a strengthener. Additionally, it was believed to heal wounds, treat swollen glands (lymph nodes), and alleviate coughs. Towards the end of the 19th century, when Zakopane gained the status of a spa town, many tuberculosis patients sought "miraculous remedies" in the form of marmot fat.

Marmot skins were used to cover horse collars or sold as fur to urban residents. However, the highlanders in the Podhale region did not use them to make their own clothing. Freshly removed marmot skins were applied to painful areas for rheumatism. Marmot meat was also considered the best among all game meats.

In the second half of the 19th century, only refuges inaccessible to hunters remained. In 1881, only 30 individuals were inventoried on the Polish side of the Tatras, and by 1888, there were 35 individuals left.

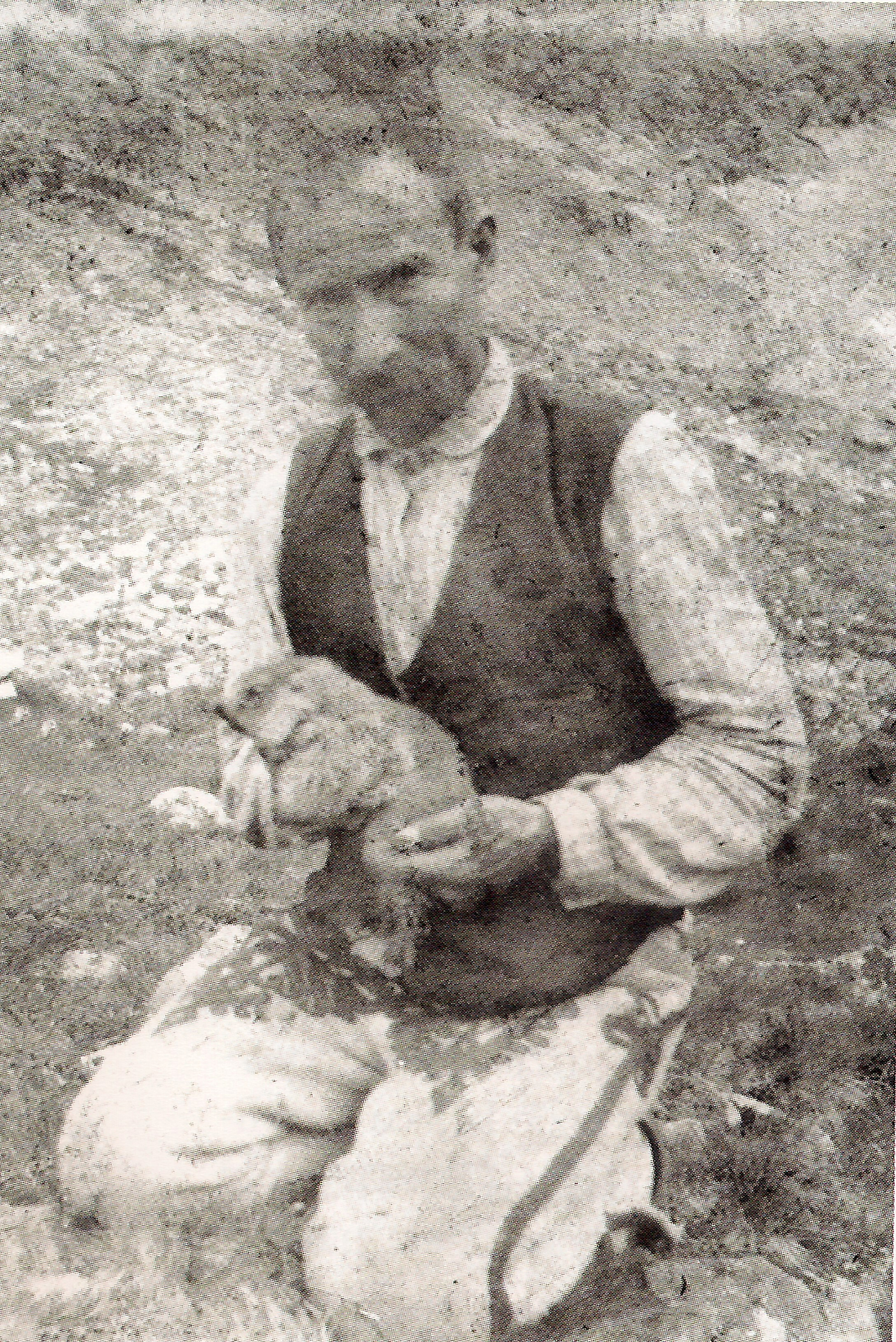
Klemens Bachleda with a captured marmot

On 5 October 1868, under pressure from members of the local history commission of the Kraków Scientific Society (Maksymilian Nowicki, Ludwik Zejszner, and Father Dr. Eugeniusz Janota), the Diet of Galicia and Lodomeria in Lviv adopted a law regarding the prohibition of capturing, exterminating, and selling alpine animals proper to the Tatras, marmots, and wild goats. This was the world's first case of parliamentary enactment of a law protecting animal species. The situation of the Tatra marmot worsened again during World War I, leading to an increase in hunting. Since then, sheep grazing in marmot habitats has also begun. A significant improvement in the situation came with the establishment of the Tatra National Park in 1954, which encompasses all marmot locations in the Polish Tatras.

The main threats to M. marmota latirostris include pressure from predators and hunting. Changes in behavior are induced by excessive tourist and sports activity. Human presence also limits contacts between colonies (e.g., in the Kasprowy Wierch area), which are necessary for genetic exchange, and increases the risk of additional diseases, including parasites.

=== Population ===
Since the significant decline of marmots in the 19th century, their population has slowly been increasing. In 1881, there were 30 marmots in the Polish Tatras, between 1888 – 35, in 1928 and 1952 – 50, in 1982 between 108 and 132, and around 190 individuals in 2003. Altogether, on both sides of the Tatras at the beginning of the 21st century, there were approximately 700–800 individuals of this subspecies.

== See also ==
- List of mammals of Poland
- Fauna of Poland
