= Volovec (Tatra) =

Peak in the Western Tatras between Slovakia and Poland

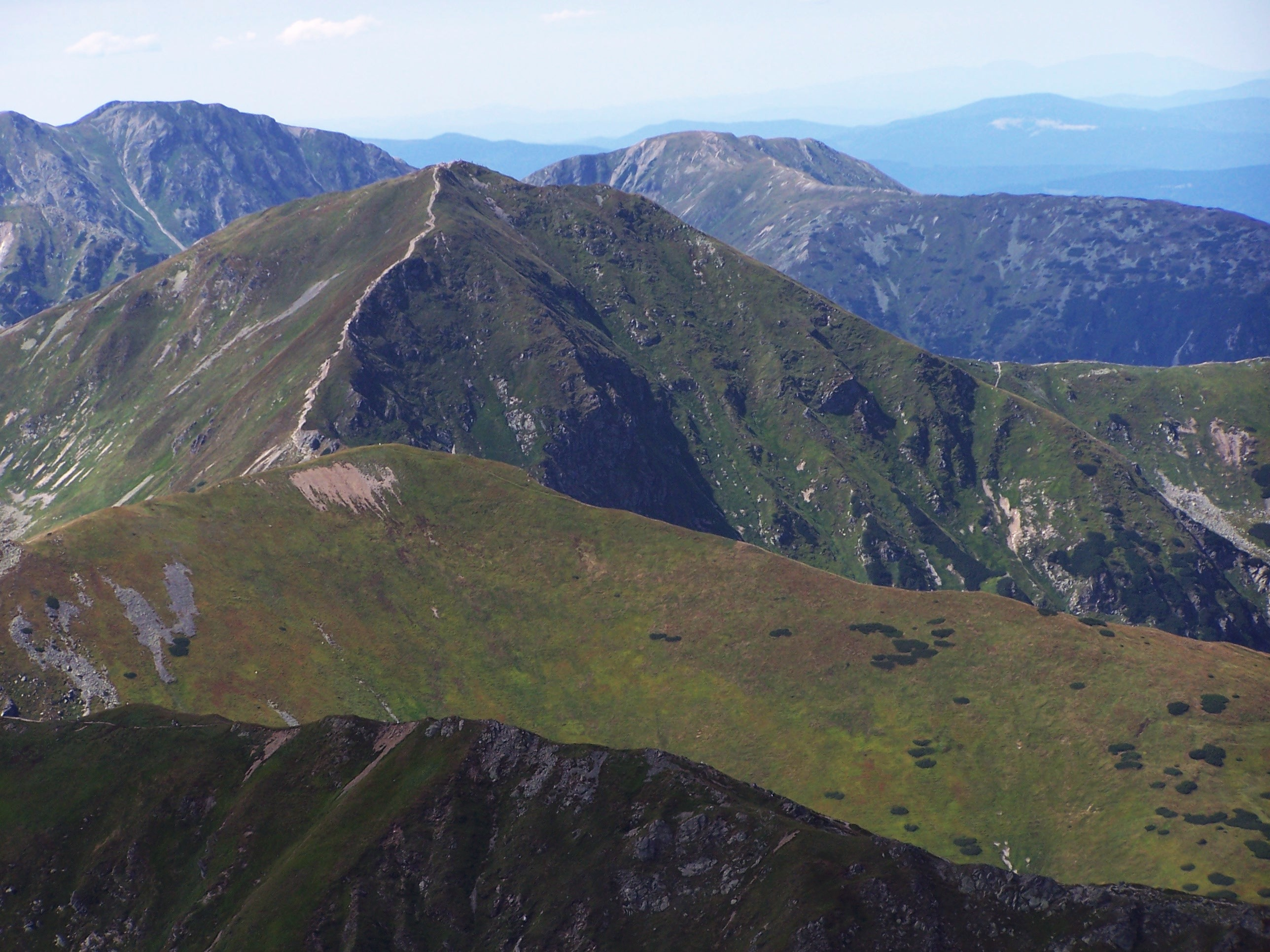
- Volovec as seen from the Ornak ridge

Highest point
- Elevation: 2,064 m (6,772 ft)
- Listing: Mountains of Poland
- Coordinates: 49°12′27″N 19°45′47″E

Geography
- Location within Slovakia Location within Poland
- Countries: Poland and Slovakia
- Parent range: Western Tatras

Climbing
- First ascent: unknown since the peak was known to local shepherds, first winter ascent in 1906
- Easiest route: Ťatliakova Chata - Rákoň - Volovec

Volovec (in Slovak) or Wołowiec (in Polish) is a mountain in the Western Tatras at the border of Slovakia and Poland. It lies on the main ridge of Western Tatras between Ostrý Roháč and mountain Deravá, standing over three valleys: Chochołowską, Roháčska and Jamnícka.

It offers views over the Polish Western Tatras, and Slovak Roháče. Janusz Chmielowski wrote in 1898: "The summit is extremely interesting (...), in the south rises the jagged group of Rohacz / Roháče (...), toward the east the High Tatras just like a giant rocky island (...) On the north stands the dome of Babia Góra. On the west lie below the Roháčske Ponds."

== History ==
The mountain's height was determined already in 1820 and it was used as an important triangulation point.

== Location and topography ==
The peak is located at a junction of three ridges:

- from the east from Jarząbczy Wierch / Hrubý Vrch and Łopata / Lopata
- from the south from Ostrý Roháč / Rohacz Ostry and Plačlivé / Rohacz Placzliwy (towards Roháče)
- from the north from Rákon / Rakoń and Grześ (towards Bobrovec)

Volovec lies on the Main Ridge of Western Tatras between Ostrý Roháč and mountain Deravá, close to mountain Rákoň. Starting from Volovec, the Main Ridge acts as the border between Poland and Slovakia.

== Description ==
The mountain consists of metamorphic rock (Alaskite and Mylonite). Local fauna include the Tatra chamois, Alpine marmot and Tatra marmot.

== Access ==
There are two marked hiking trails which lead to the summit of Volovec, red and blue. A third, green one, connects with the blue one at the saddle beneath the mountain. All routes pose no technical difficulty and when taking into account the relatively large distance and altitude difference involved, the summit is one of the most challenging climbs in Western Tatras accessible even to children. An exception to this is trying to access Volovec through Ostrý Roháč and Jamnícke saddle, which is one of the most exposed climbs on the main ridge of Western Tatras.

- Red trail from Jarząbczy Wierch / Hrubý Vrch (2:10 h)
- Blue trail from village Oravice through Jamnícka valley
- Green trail from Polana Chochołowska through Dolina Chochołowska Wyżnia, it connects with the blue trail at the saddle between Rákoň and Volovec (2:40 h, ↓ 2:05 h)

Hiking off-trails is forbidden in Polish Western Tatras and allowed only at certain areas in Slovak Western Tatras and only when accompanied by a mountain guide or when holding a UIAA license.

== Gallery ==
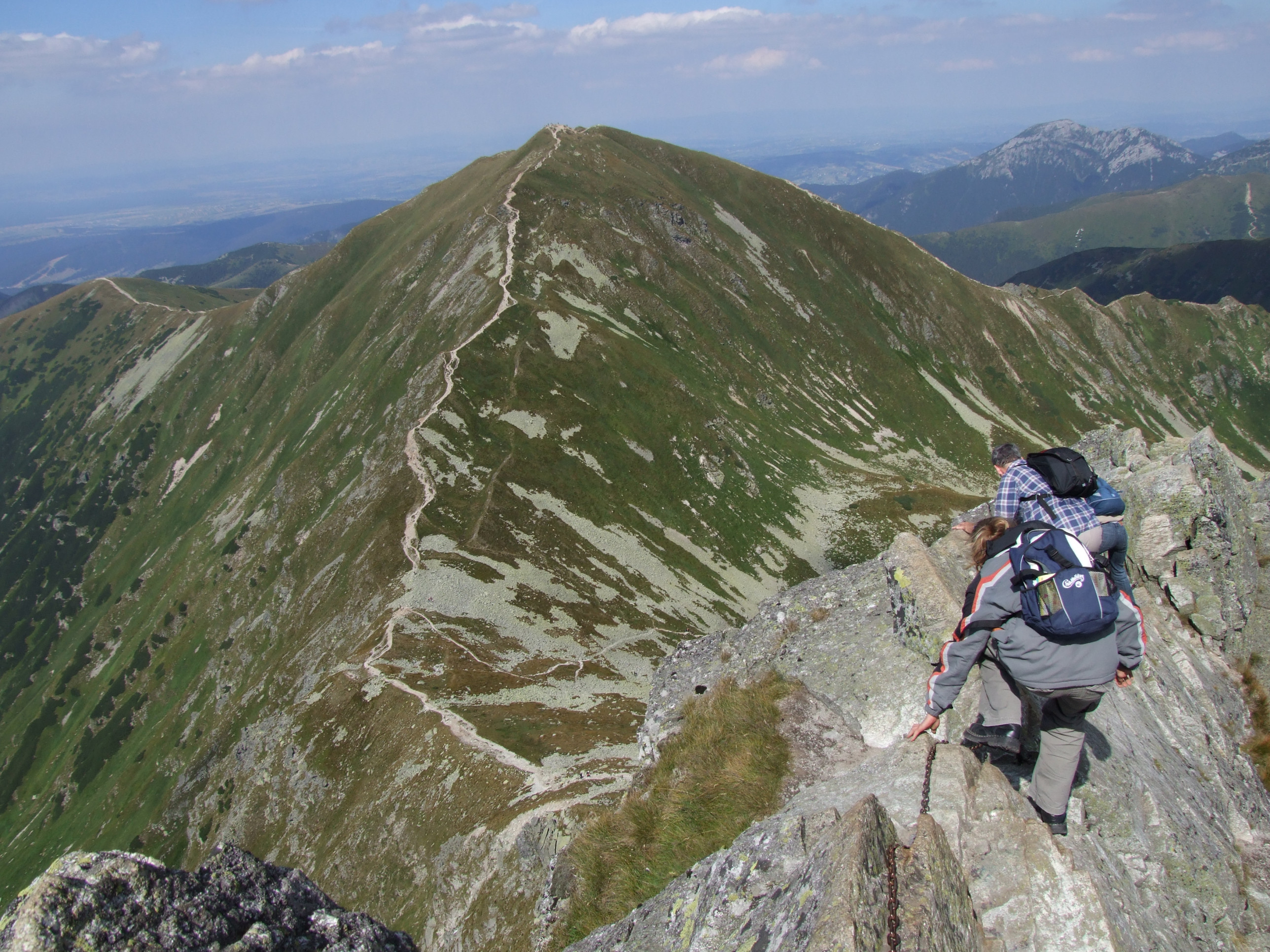
Volovec as seen from Ostrý Roháč / Rohacz Ostry

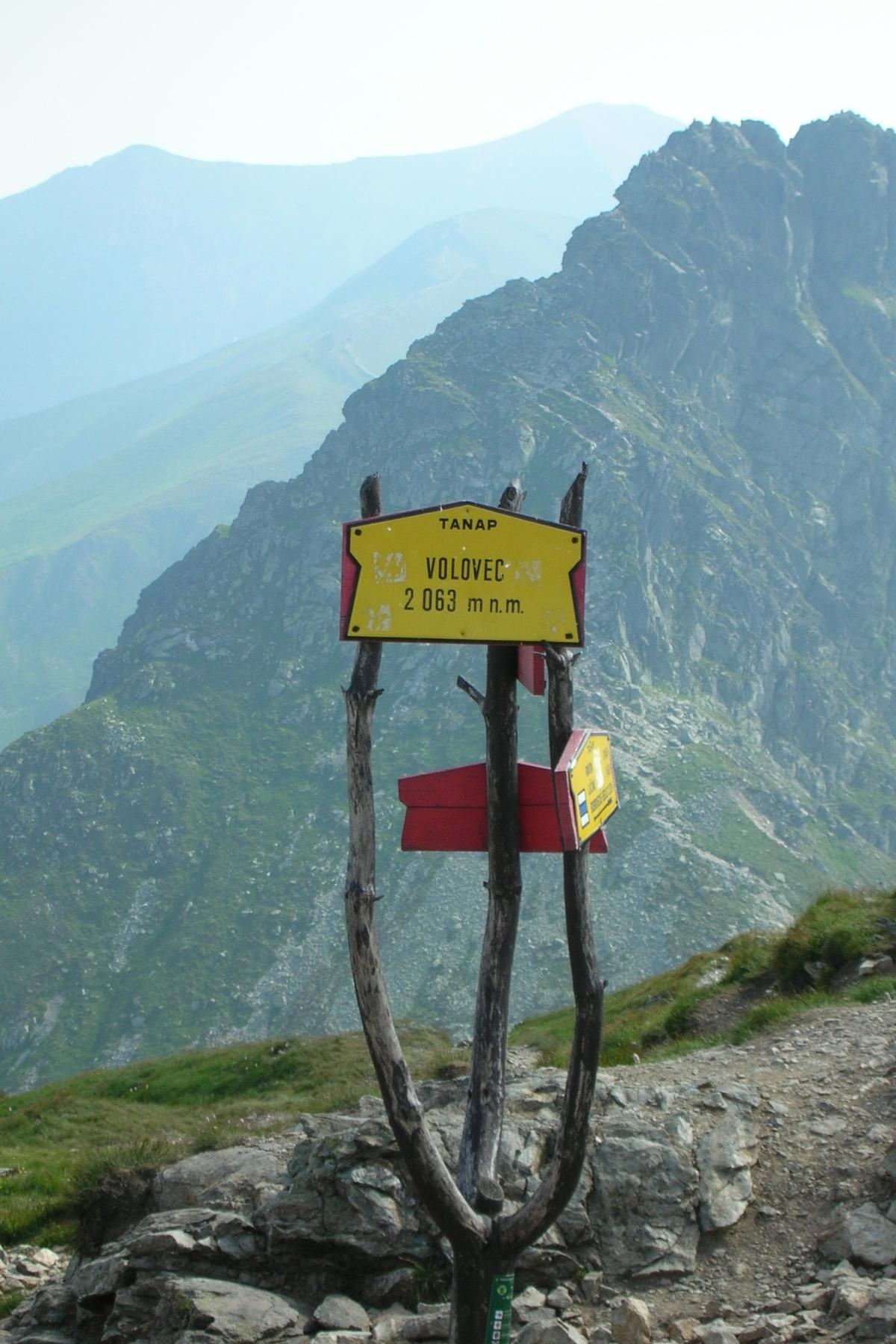
Tourist marker at the summit

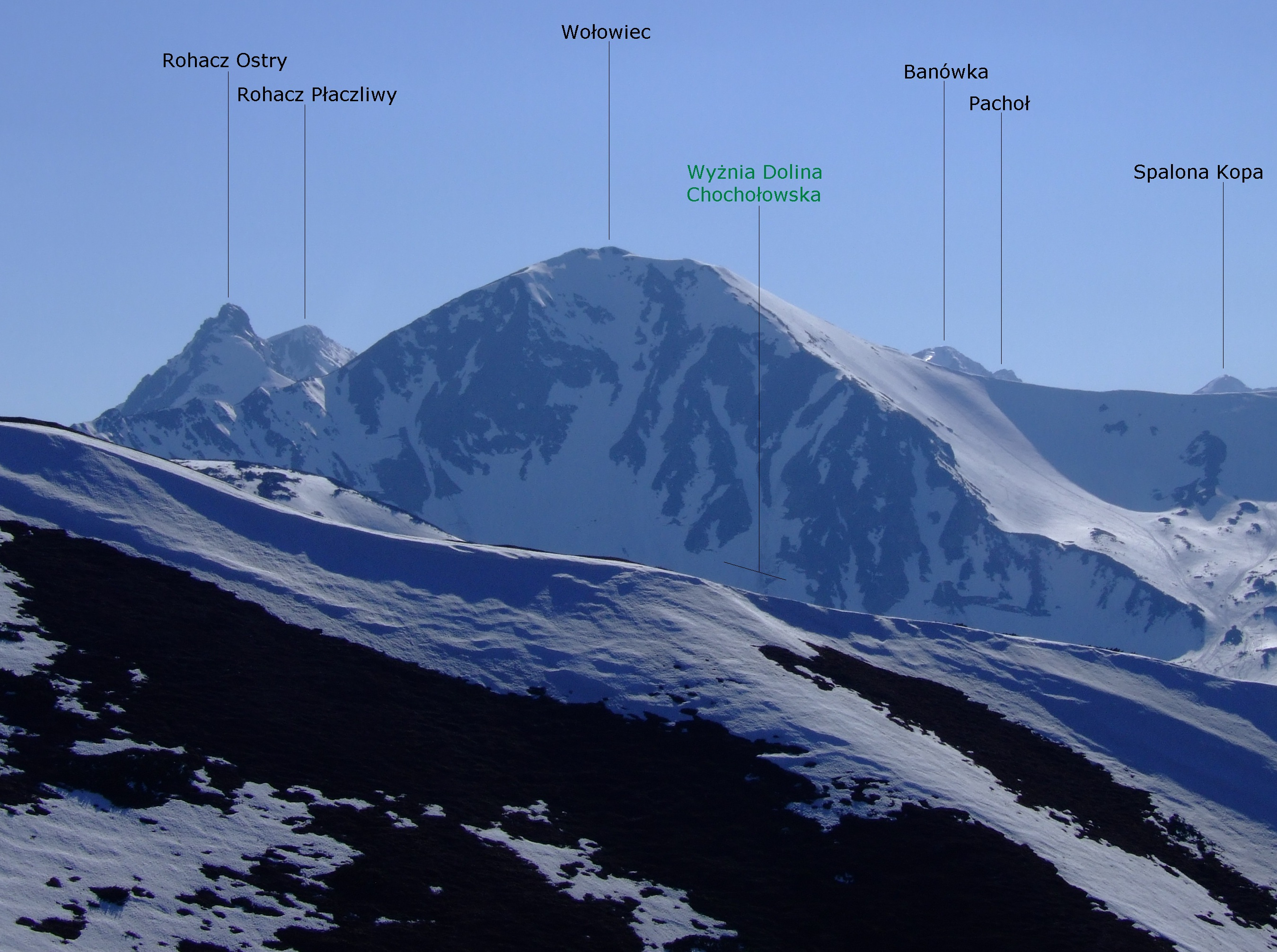
Volovec as seen from Trzydniowiańsky Wierch

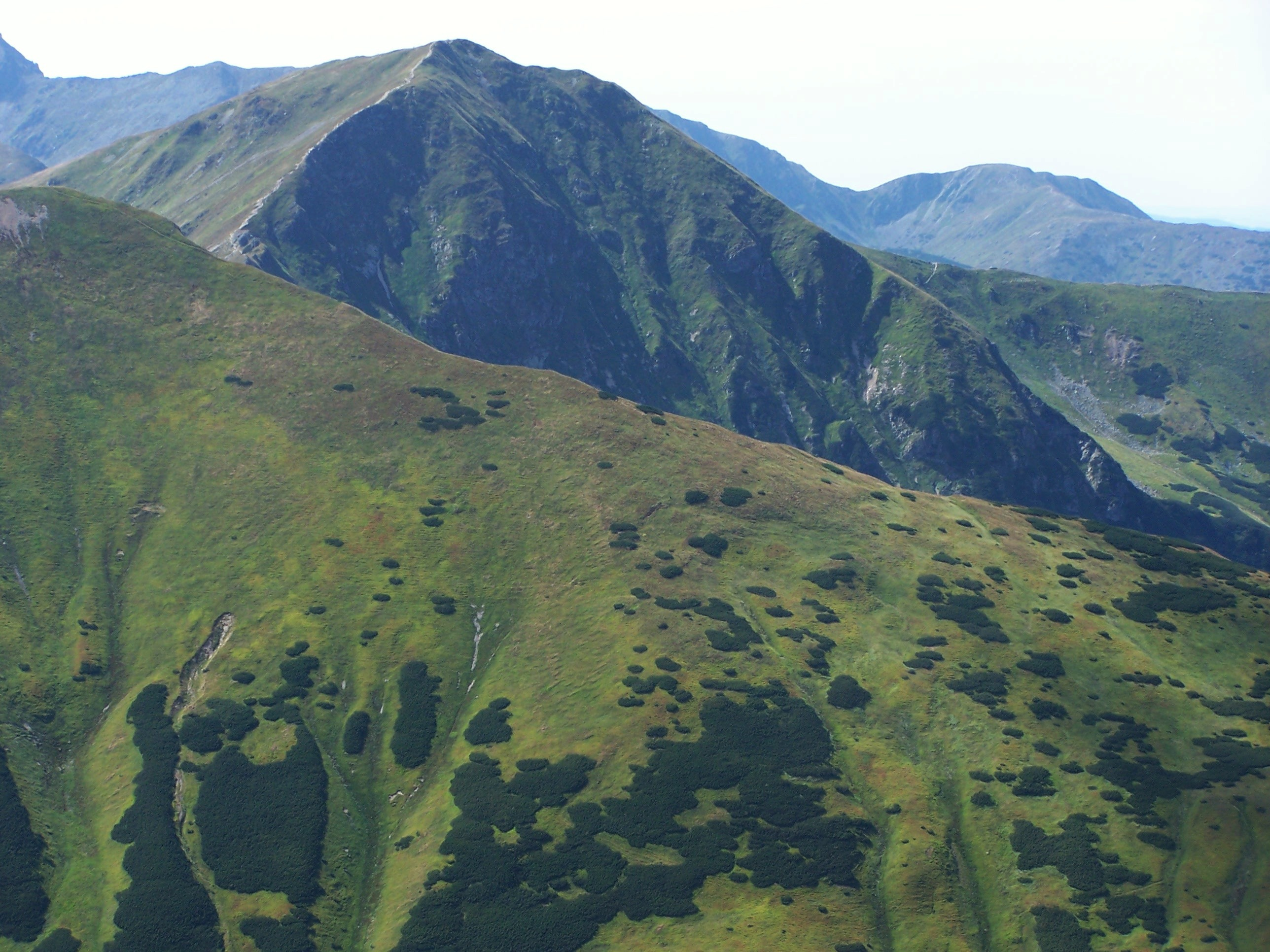
Volovec, in the foreground part of Łopata / Lopata

== See also ==
- Tatra Mountains
