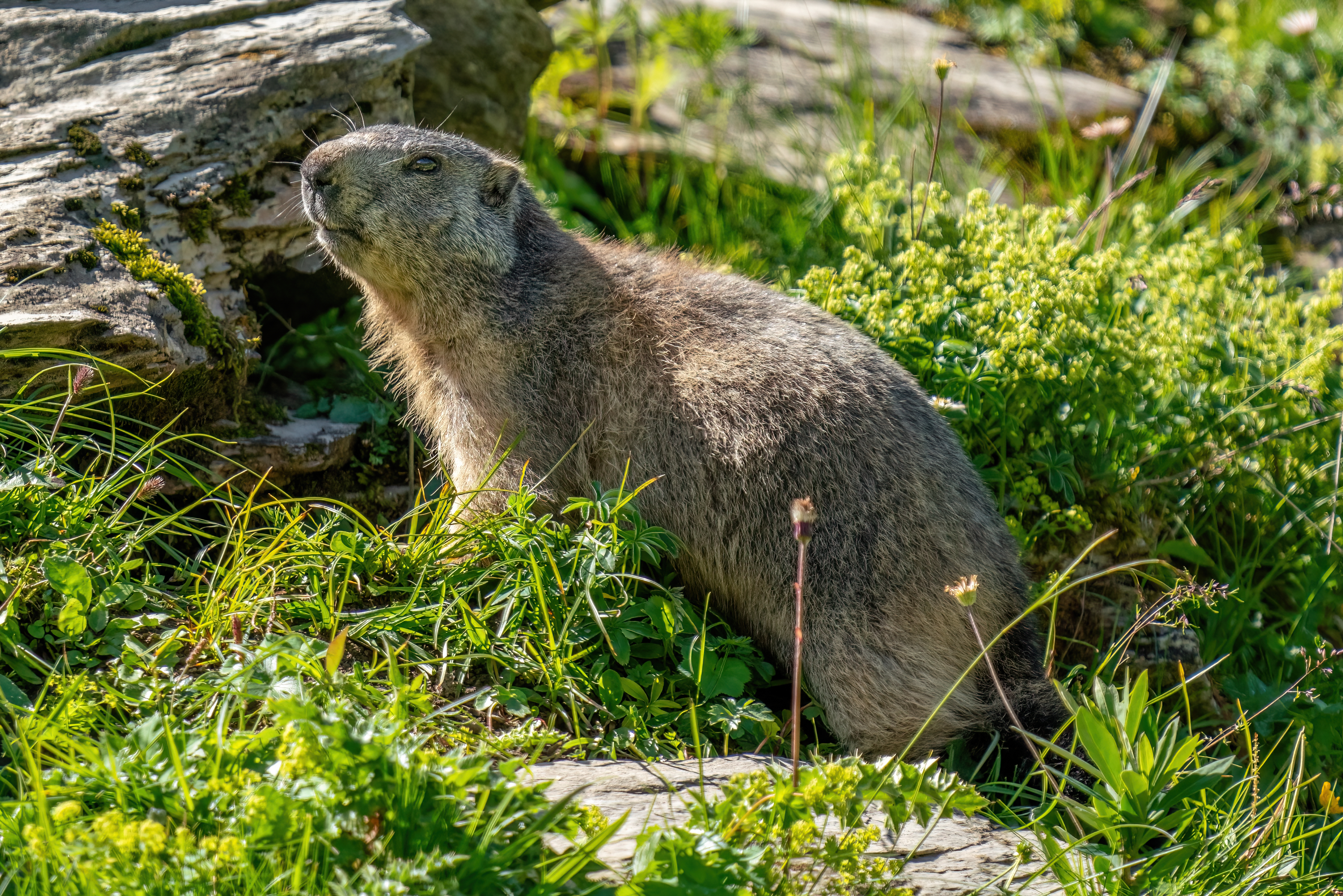

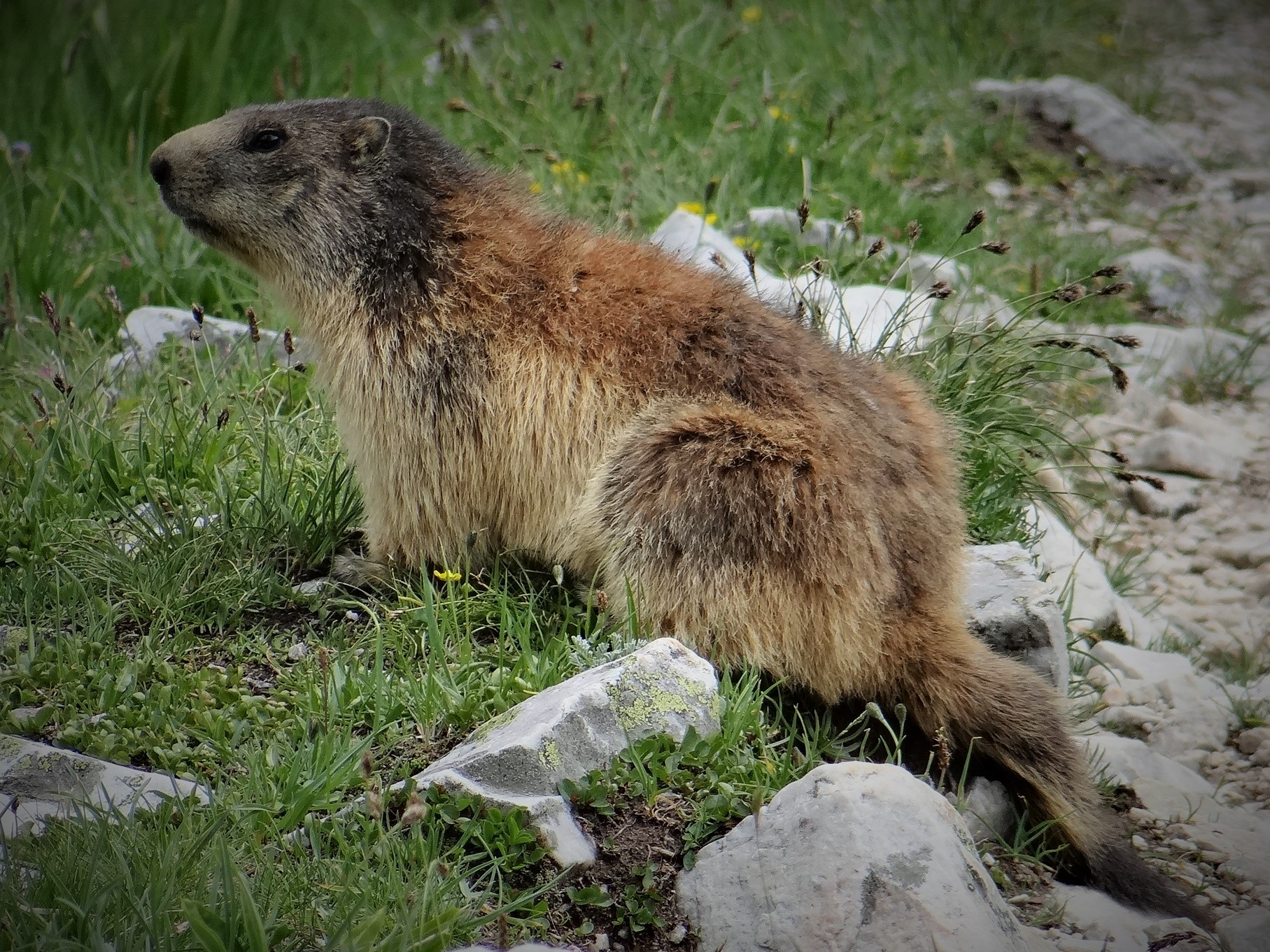
- Individual in Grand Muveran Nature Reserve, Switzerland (above), and Vanoise National Park, France (below)

Conservation status
- Least Concern (IUCN 3.1)

Scientific classification
- Kingdom: Animalia
- Phylum: Chordata
- Class: Mammalia
- Order: Rodentia
- Family: Sciuridae
- Genus: Marmota
- Species: M. marmota

Binomial name
- Marmota marmota (Linnaeus, 1758)
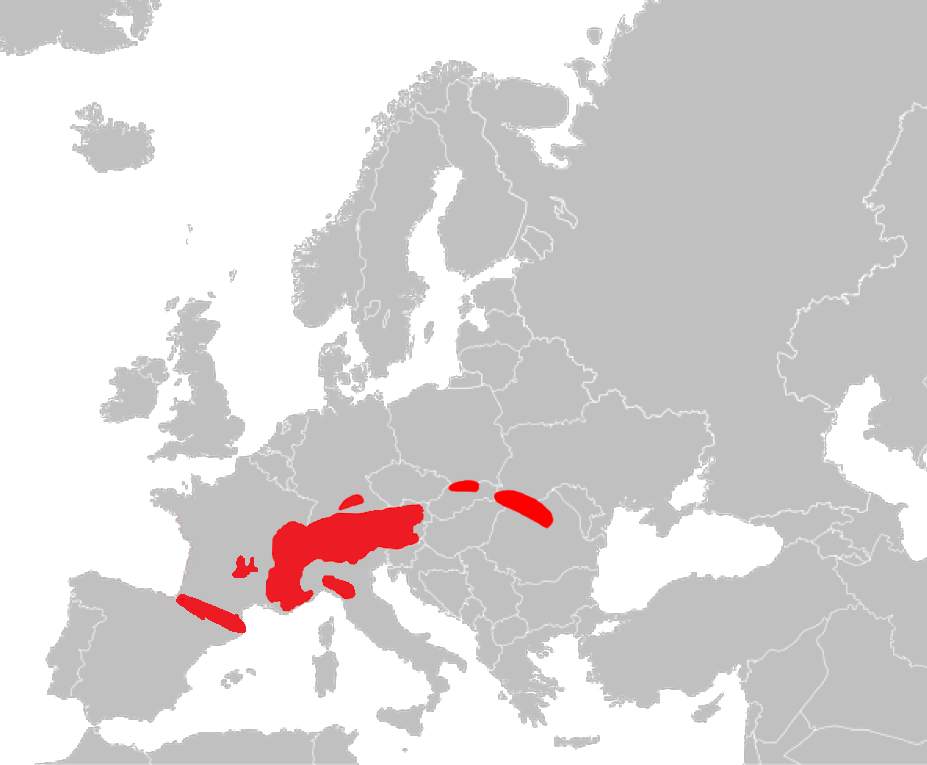
- Range in red

Synonyms
- Mus marmota Linnaeus, 1758

= Alpine marmot =

Species of rodent

The alpine marmot (Marmota marmota) is a large ground-dwelling squirrel, from the genus of marmots. It is found in high numbers in mountainous areas of central and southern Europe, at heights between 800 and 3,200 m (2,600–10,500 ft) in the Alps, Carpathians, Tatras and Northern Apennines. In 1948 they were reintroduced with success in the Pyrenees, where the alpine marmot had disappeared at end of the Pleistocene epoch.

== Evolution ==
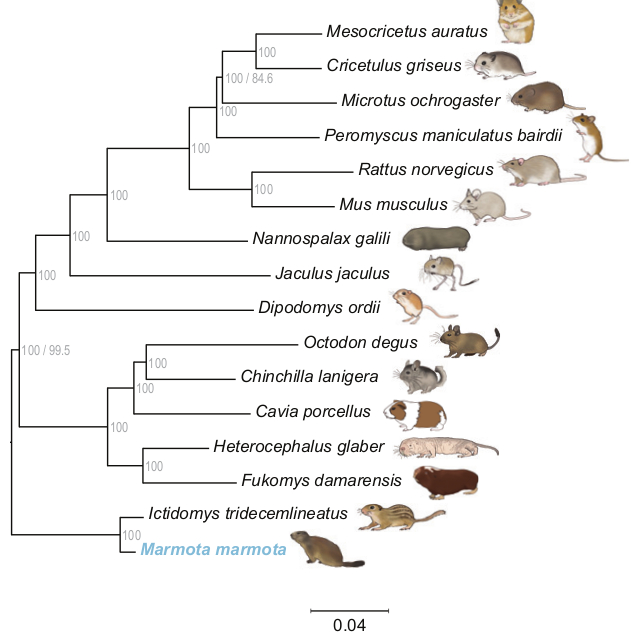
Reconstruction of the phylogenetic tree of Rodentia on the basis of their whole genomes

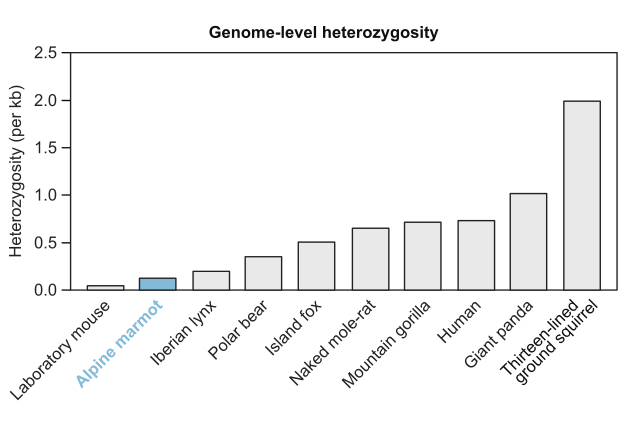
The Alpine marmot genome is characterized by remarkably low heterozygosity at the genome level, as compared to other species known for low levels of heterozygosity.

The alpine marmot originates as an animal of Pleistocene cold steppe, exquisitely adapted to this ice-age climate. As such, alpine marmots are excellent diggers, able to penetrate soil that even a pickaxe would have difficulty with, and spend up to nine months per year in hibernation.

Since the disappearance of the Pleistocene cold steppe, the alpine marmot persists in the high altitude alpine meadow. During the colonisation of Alpine habitat, the alpine marmot has lost most of its genetic diversity through a bottleneck effect. It could not rebuild its genetic diversity ever since, as its lifestyle adapted to the Ice Age climate slowed its rate of genomic evolution. The alpine marmot is one of the least genetically diverse wild-living animals.

== Description ==
An adult alpine marmot is between 43 and 73 cm (17–29 in) in head-and-body length and the tail measures from 13 to 20 cm (5–8 in). The body mass ranges from 1.9 to 8 kg (4.2–17.6 lb), with the animals being significantly lighter in the spring (just after hibernation) than in the autumn (just before hibernation). The alpine marmot is sometimes considered the heaviest squirrel species, although some other marmot species have a similar weight range, making it unclear exactly which is the largest. Its coat is a mixture of blonde, reddish and dark gray fur. While most of the alpine marmot's fingers have claws, its thumbs have nails.

== Range and ecology ==
As its name suggests, the alpine marmot ranges throughout the European Alps, ranging through alpine areas of France, Italy, Switzerland, Germany, Slovenia, and Austria. They have also been introduced elsewhere with sub-populations in the Pyrenees, France's Massif Central, Jura, Vosges, Black Forest, Apennine Mountains, and the Romanian Carpathians. The Tatra marmot (M. m. latirostris Kratochvíl, 1961) represents an endemic subspecies of Alpine marmot that originated during the Quaternary period. Tatra marmots inhabit Tatry Mountains and Nízke Tatry Mountains. Marmots are abundant in their core population; in the Romanian Carpathians, for example, the population is estimated at 1,500 individuals. Alpine marmots prefer alpine meadows and high-altitude pastures, where colonies live in deep burrow systems situated in alluvial soil or rocky areas.

Marmots may be seen "sun bathing", but actually this is often on a flat rock and it is believed they are actually cooling, possibly to deal with parasites. Marmots are temperature sensitive and an increase in temperature can cause habitat loss for the species as a whole.

=== Diet ===
Alpine marmots eat plants such as grasses and herbs, as well as grain, insects, spiders and worms. They prefer young and tender plants over any other kind, and hold food in their forepaws while eating. They mainly emerge from their burrows to engage in feeding during the morning and afternoon, as they are not well suited to heat, which may result in them not feeding at all on very warm days. In favorable weather, they consume large amounts of food to build a fat layer that enables survival through their long hibernation.

== Lifestyle ==
When creating a burrow, they use both their forepaws and hind feet to assist in the work—the forepaws scrape away the soil, which is then pushed out of the way by the hind feet. If there are any stones in the way, the alpine marmot will remove them with its teeth provided that the stones aren't too large. "Living areas" are created at the end of a burrow, and are often lined with dried hay, grass and plant stems. Any other burrow tunnels that go nowhere are used as toilet areas. Once burrows have been completed, they only host one family. They are often enlarged by the next generation, sometimes creating very complex burrows over time. Each alpine marmot will live in a group that consists of several burrows, and which has a dominant breeding pair. Alpine marmots are very defensive against intruders, and will warn them off using intimidating behavior, such as beating of the tail and chattering of the teeth, and by marking their territory with their scent. One can often see an alpine marmot "standing" while they keep a look-out for potential predators or other dangers. Warnings are given, by emitting a series of loud whistles, after which members of the colony may be seen running for cover. The mating season for alpine marmots occurs in the spring, right after their hibernation period comes to a close, which gives their offspring the highest possible chance of storing enough fat to survive the coming winter. Alpine marmots are able to breed once they reach an age of two years. Dominant females tend to suppress reproduction of subordinates by being antagonistic towards them while they are pregnant which causes stress and kills the young. Once the female is pregnant, she will take bedding materials (such as grass) into the burrow for when she gives birth after a gestation period of 33–34 days. Each litter consists of between one and seven babies, though this number is usually three. The babies are born blind and will grow dark fur within several days. The weaning period takes a further forty days, during which time the mother will leave the young in the burrow while she searches for food. After this period, the offspring will come out of the burrow and search for solid food themselves. Their fur becomes the same colour as adult alpine marmots by the end of the summer, and after two years they will have reached their full size. If kept in captivity, alpine marmots can live up to 15–18 years.

=== Hibernation ===
Alpine marmots survive extreme changes in weather and food shortages during winter by hibernating. As the summer begins to end, alpine marmots will gather old stems in their burrows in order to serve as bedding for their impending hibernation, which can start as early as October. They seal the burrow with a combination of earth and their own faeces. Once winter arrives, alpine marmots will huddle next to each other and begin hibernation, a process which lowers their heart rate to five beats per minute and breathing to 1–3 breaths per minute. Huddling next to nestmates allows for passive heat exchange and larger hibernating groups result in increased survivability. During hibernation their stored fat supplies are used slowly, which usually allows them to survive the winter. Their body temperature will drop to almost the same as the air around them, although their heart and breathing rates will speed up if the environment approaches freezing point. Some alpine marmots will starve to death due to their layers of fat running out; this is most likely to happen in younger individuals.

== Interaction with humans ==
Alpine marmots were once widely hunted for food and because their fat is believed to ease rheumatism when rubbed on the skin. Hunting of the alpine marmot still occurs for sport as well as for its fat. Hunting is a danger to the species if insufficiently regulated, as they reproduce relatively slowly. In general the alpine marmot is currently not in danger of extinction, but certain sub-populations of marmot may be threatened such as those in the Jura and in Germany. A population in Rodna (Romania) is very small and threatened by poaching.

The use of trained alpine marmots by itinerants from Savoy was a not uncommon occurrence in the late 18th century. The marmot would be kept in a small box while in transit, and during a performance, the marmot would dance to the playing of an instrument, such as a hurdy-gurdy. Marmots became associated with the people of Savoy, and their style of dress, and the image of a traveling Savoyard with a marmot was captured in art, such as in François-Hubert Drouais' painting The Children of the Duke of Bouillon dressed as Montagnards, and in Ludwig van Beethoven's composition, Marmotte.

== Image gallery ==
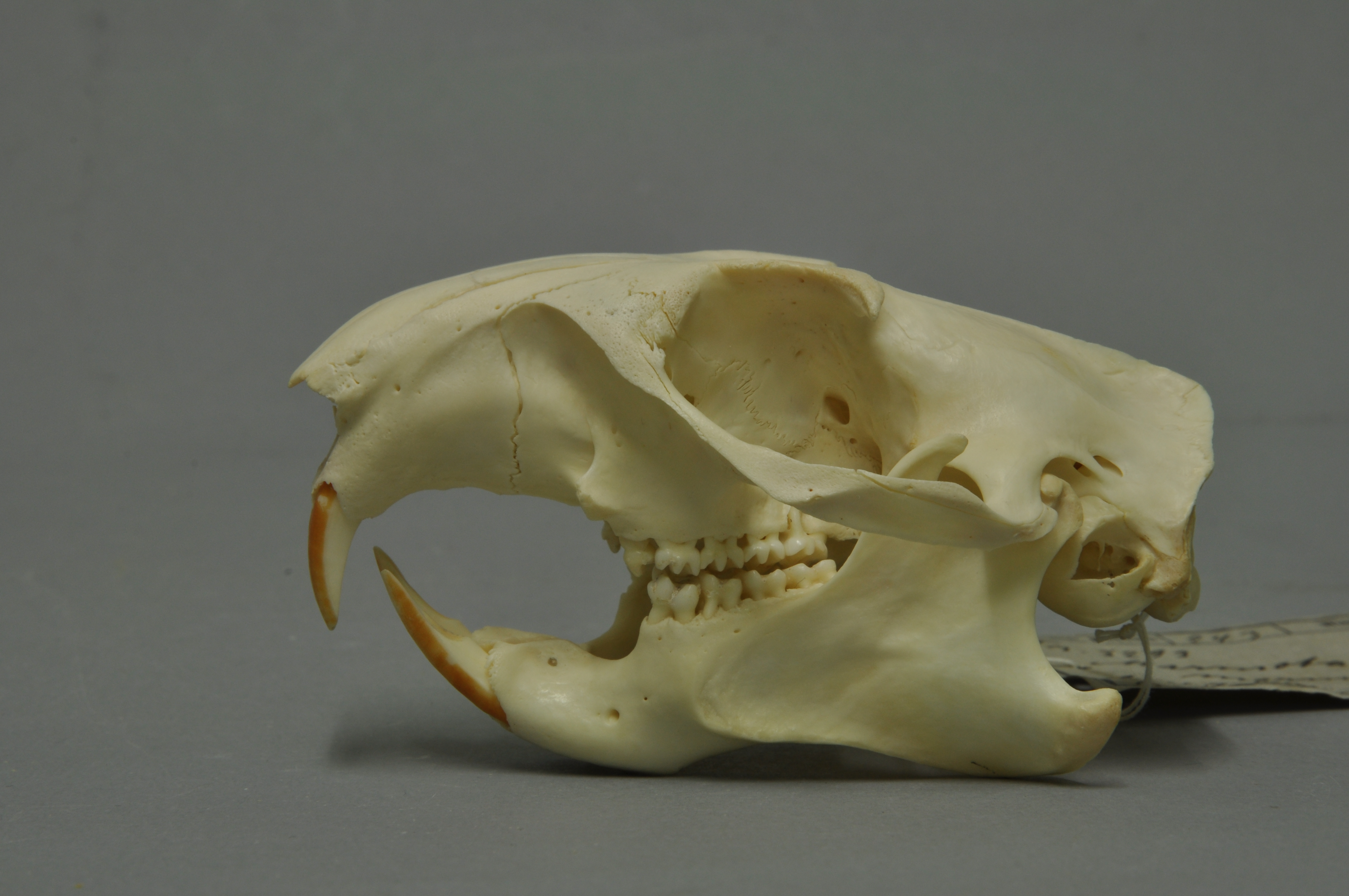
Skull of an alpine marmot

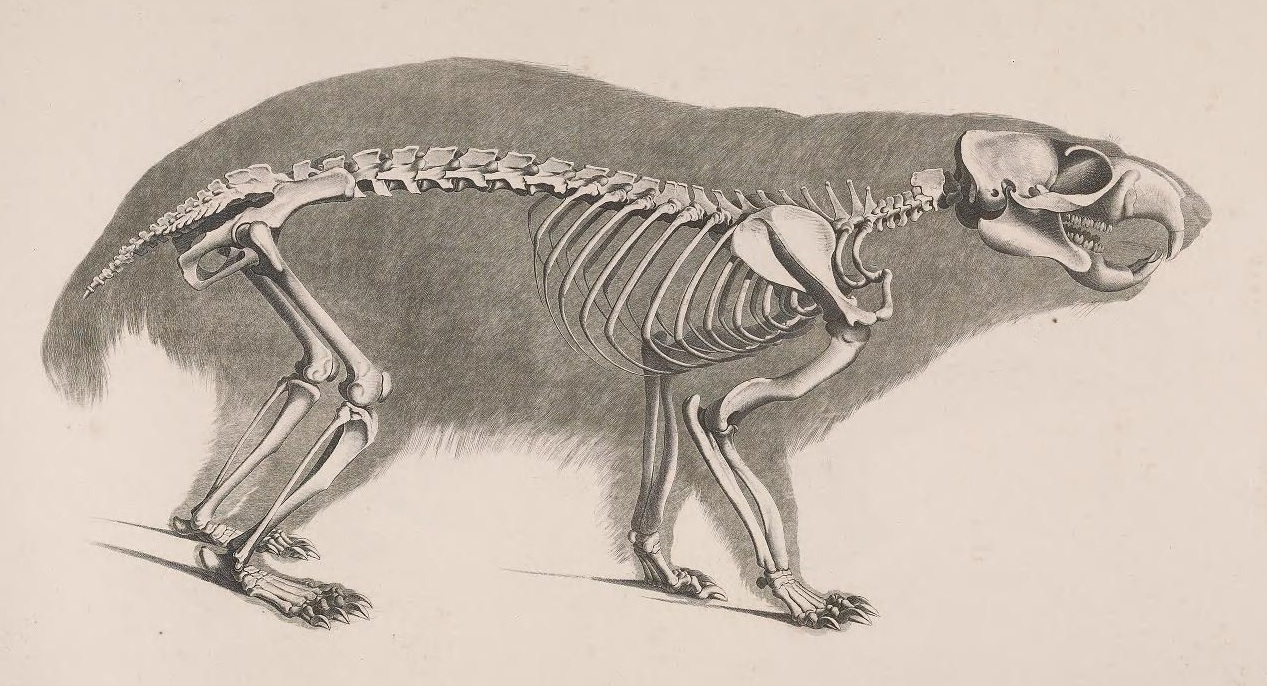
Skeleton

Alarm call of an Alpine marmot. Savoie, French Alps.

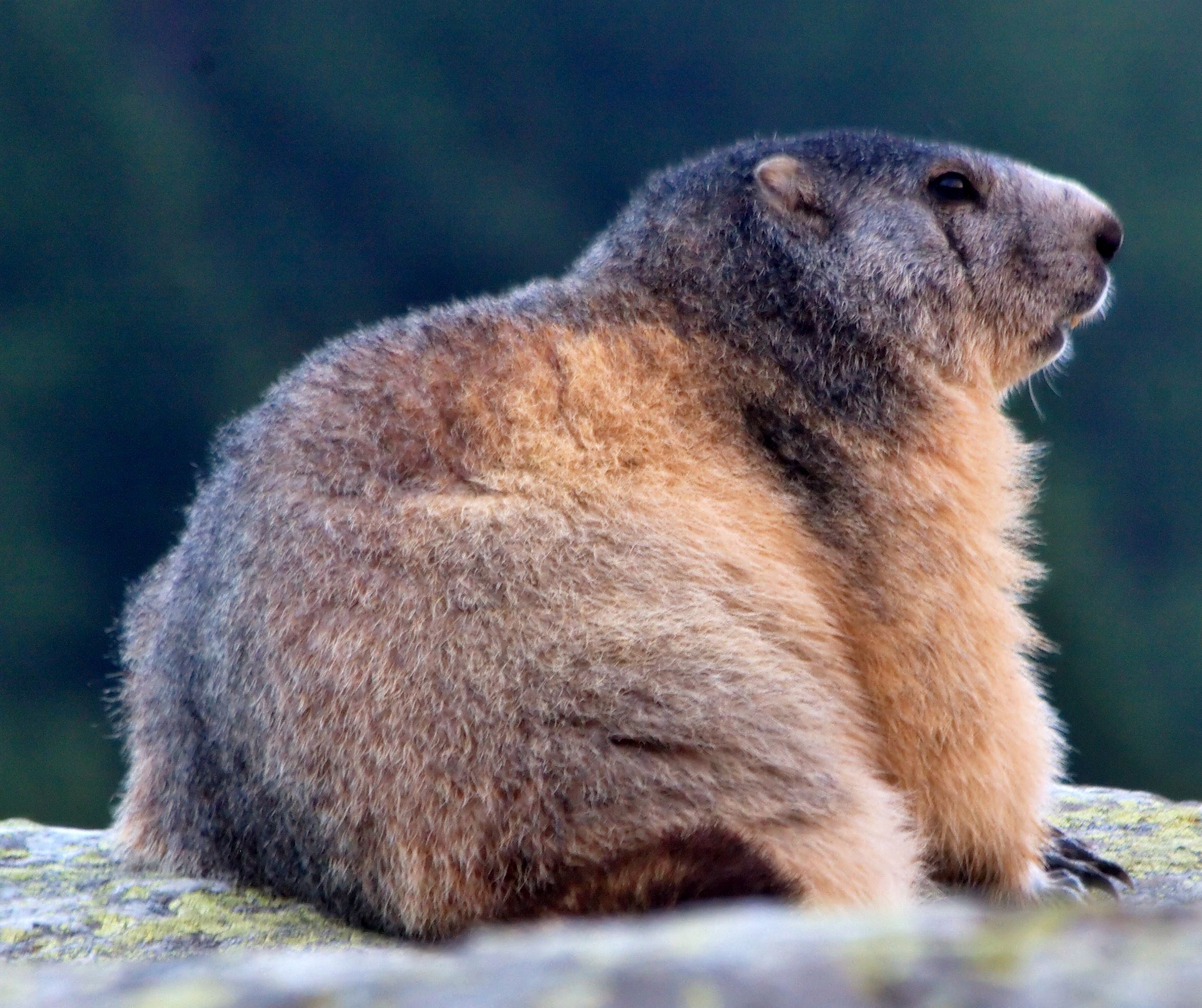
An alpine marmot at the end of summer. Note the fattened belly.

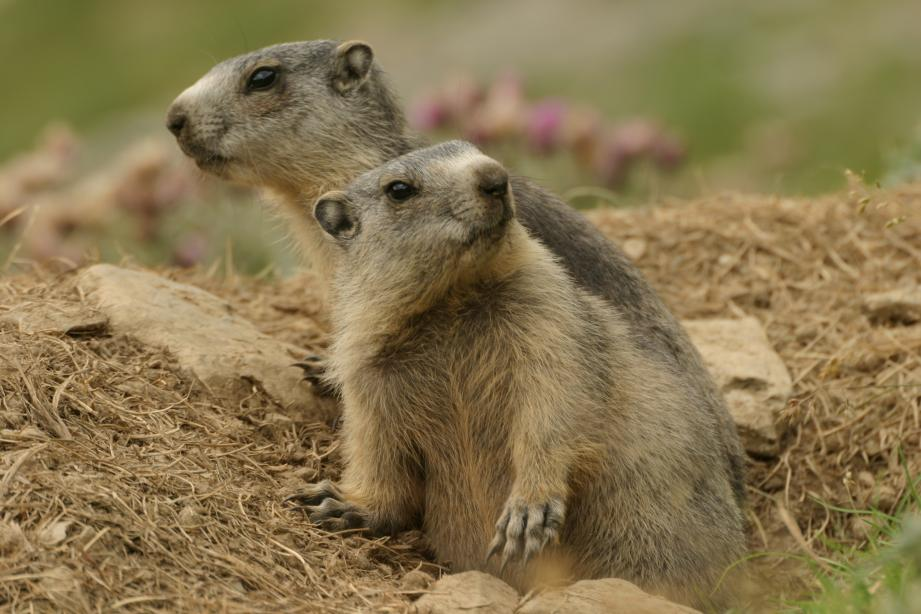
Introduced alpine marmots in the Pyrenees

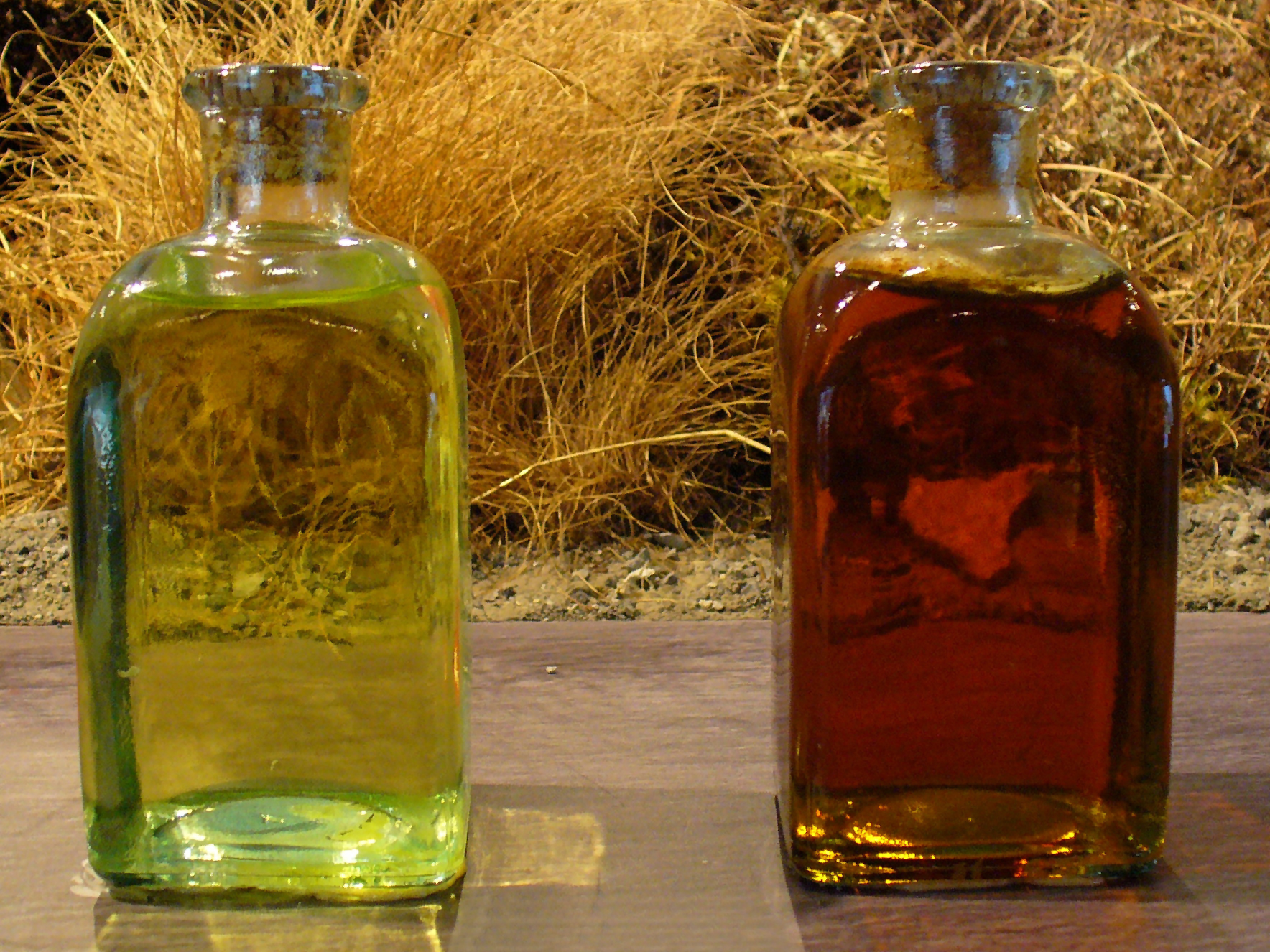
Rendered marmot fat

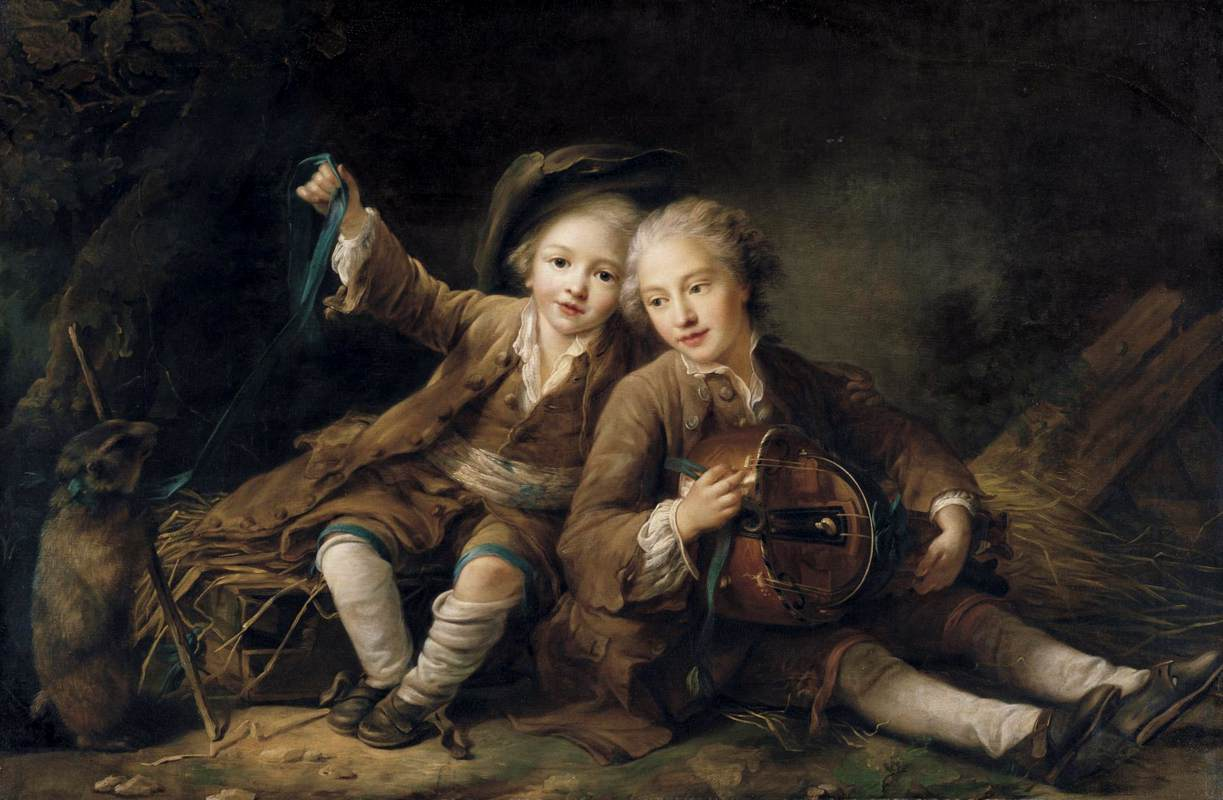
Drouais, François-Hubert – The Children of the Duc de Bouillon – 1756

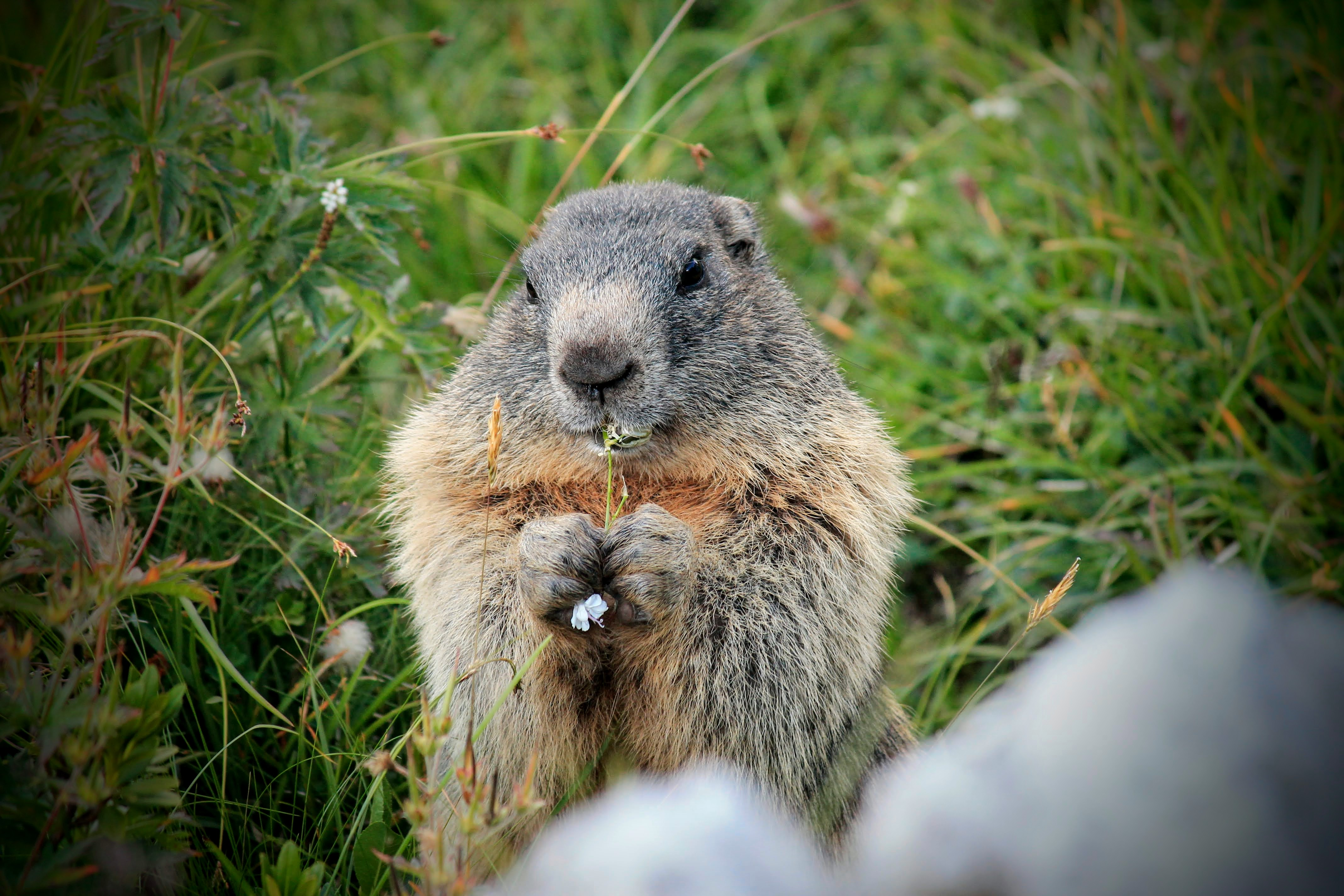
Alpine marmot, (Marmota marmota Linnaeus, 1758), eating a small flower.

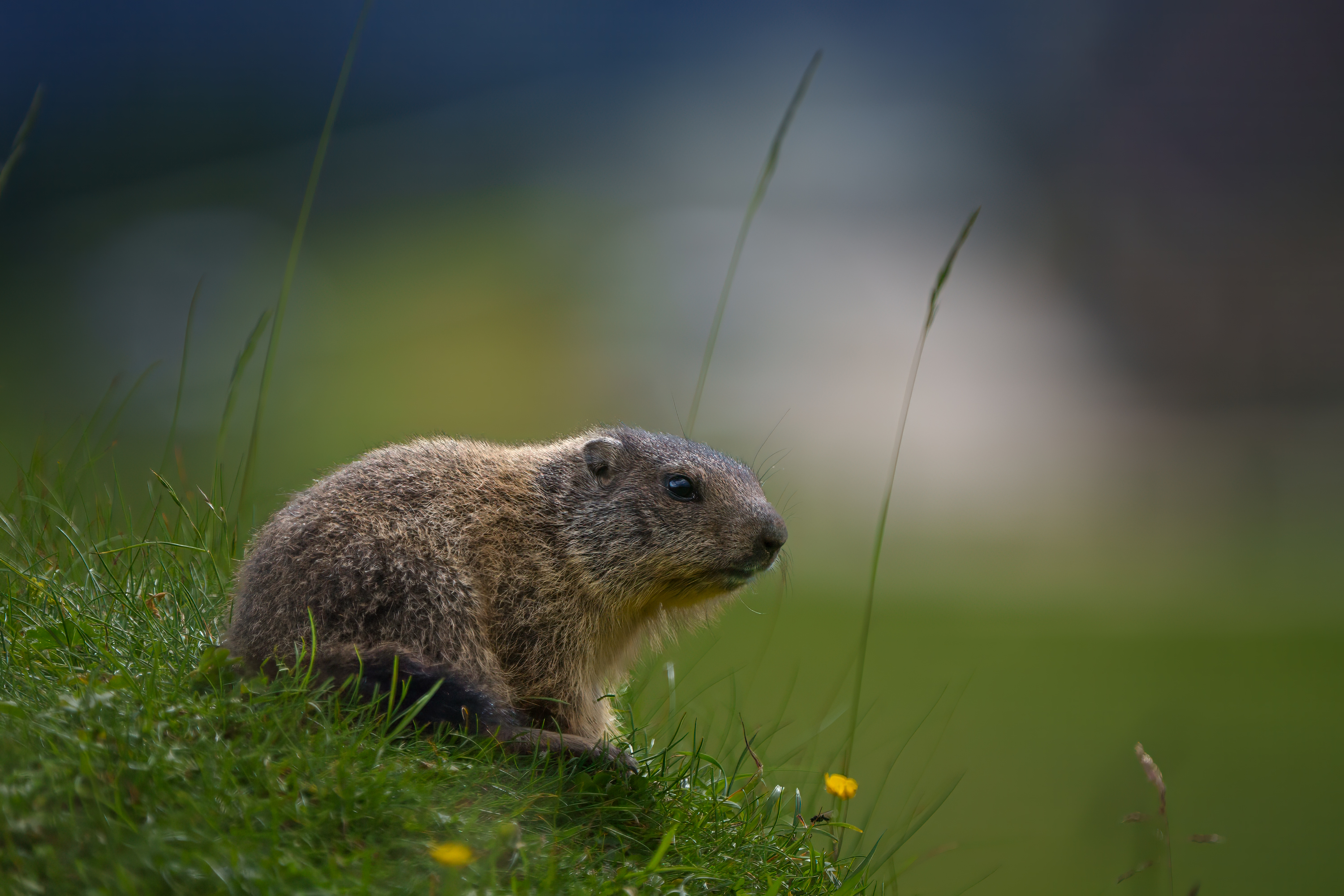
An alpine marmot sitting on a hill
