= Gabriel Rzączyński =

Gabriel Rzączyński (6 July 1664 – 12 November 1737) was a Polish Jesuit, naturalist, geographer, and writer. He published several works in Latin on the natural history and folklore of Poland.

Rzączyński was born in Podlasie, from a family bearing the Ślepowron coat of arms, and joined the Jesuit order in 1682 and became a grammar teacher from 1687 at Lublin. In 1692 he taught theology at Kraków, still later rhetoric and philosophy at Toruń, Lublin and Poznań, and Łuck. After 1717 he became a prefect of Gdańsk schools and from 1721 rector at Ostrog. Following his wide travels he wrote on the curiosities of natural history in his Historia naturalis curiosa Regni Poloniae, Magni Ducatus Litvaniae, annexarumque provinciarum, in tractatus XX divisa (1721). In 1745 was published posthumously his Auctuarium [sic] historiae naturalis curiosae Regni Poloniae, Magni Ducatus Lithvaniae, annexarumque provinciarum, concinnatum. Aside from fauna, flora and geography, he wrote on contemporary myths and beliefs. In his 1721 work, he included descriptions of beliefs in vampires and walking corpses.

Since the late 1710s, Rzączyński collaborated with naturalists from Gdańsk (Germ. Danzig) - Johann Philipp Breyne and Jacob Theodor Klein - providing them, among other things, with natural specimens from the eastern territories of the Polish-Lithuanian Commonwealth.
