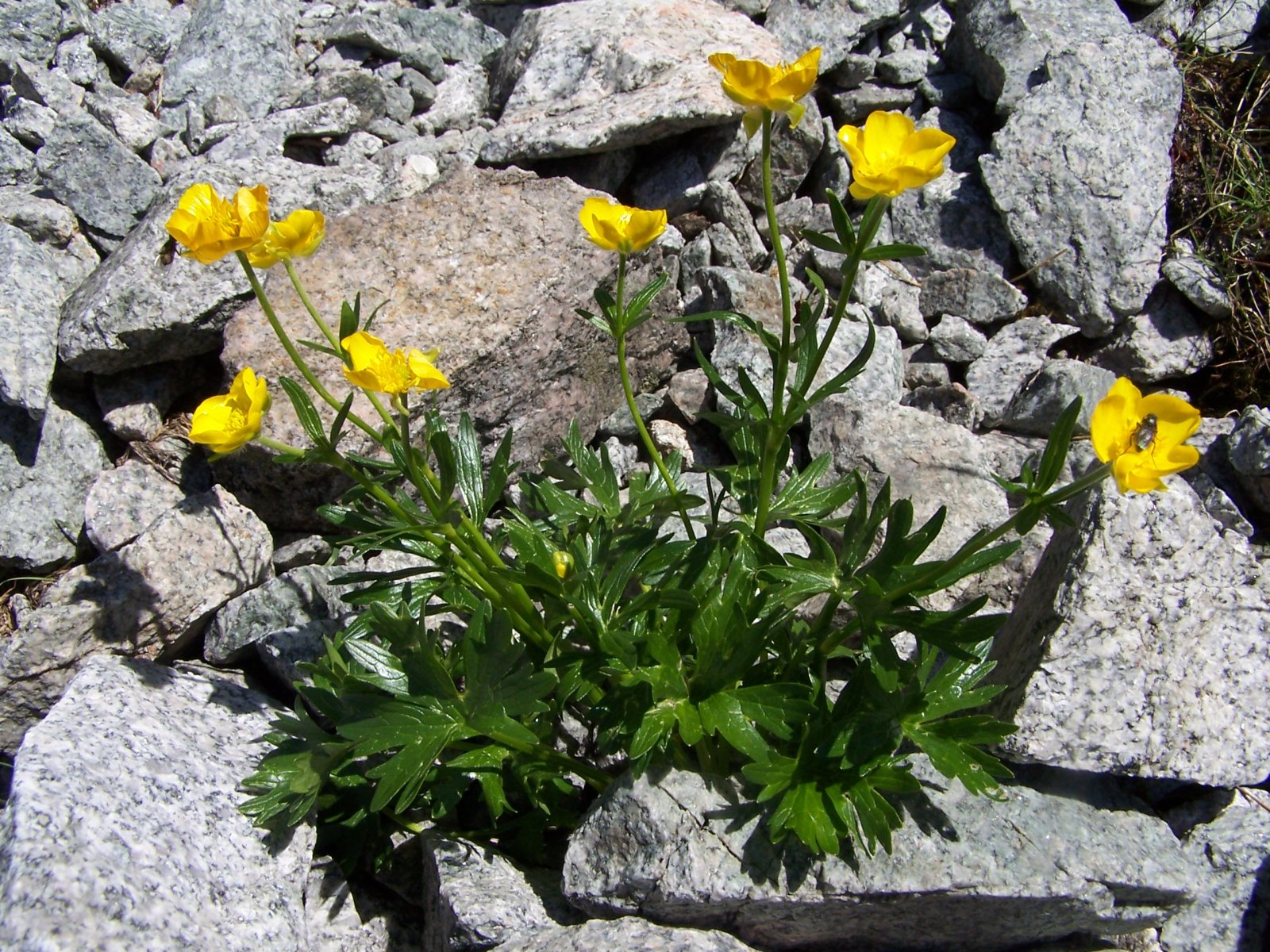

Scientific classification
- Kingdom: Plantae
- Clade: Tracheophytes
- Clade: Angiosperms
- Clade: Eudicots
- Order: Ranunculales
- Family: Ranunculaceae
- Genus: Ranunculus
- Species: R. pseudomontanus

Binomial name
- Ranunculus pseudomontanus Schur

= Ranunculus pseudomontanus =

Species of flowering plant

Ranunculus pseudomontanus is a flowering plant native to Bulgaria, Czechoslovakia, Poland, Romania, Ukraine, and Yugoslavia.
