= Ludwik Zejszner =

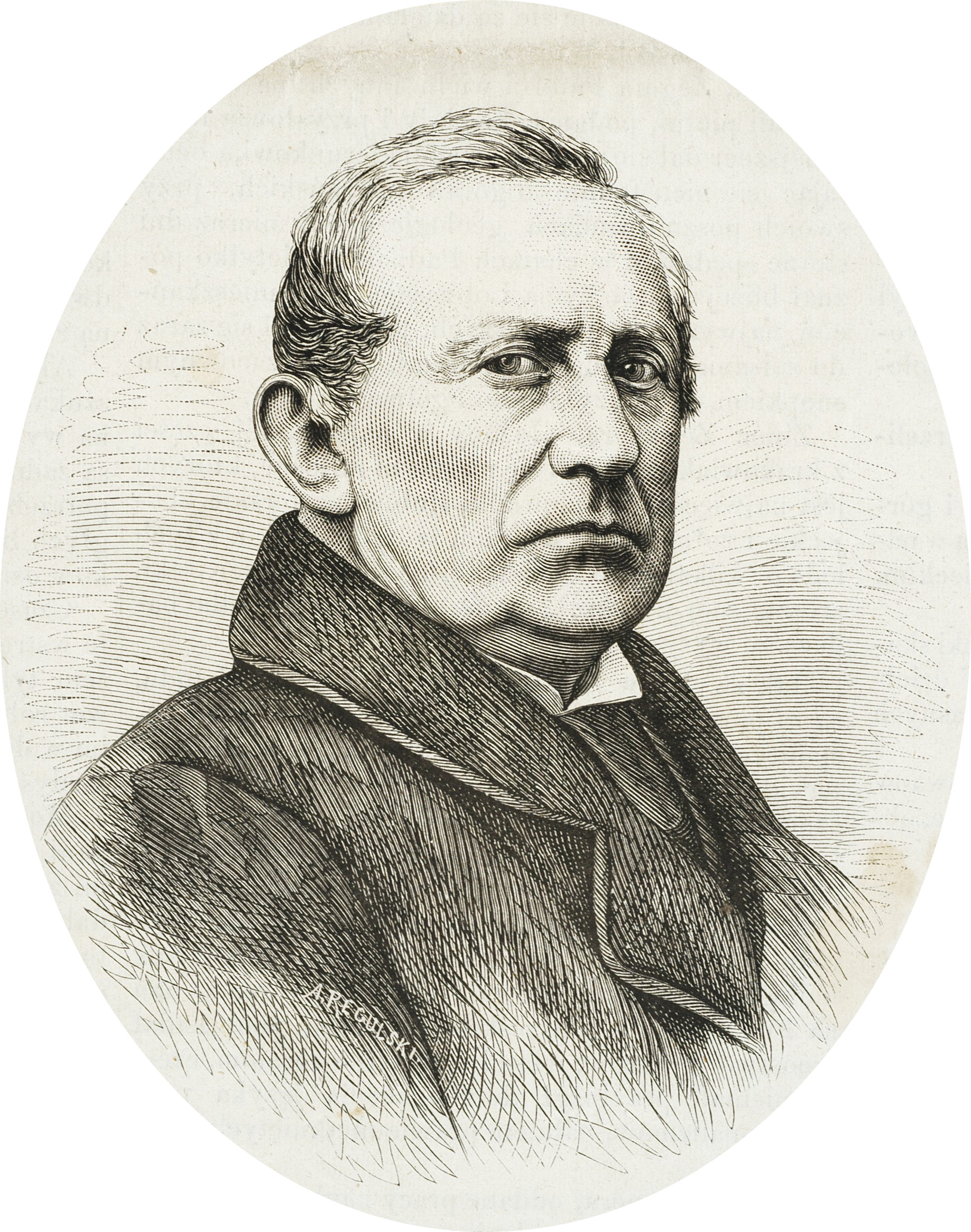
- Born: 1805
- Died: 1871 (aged 65–66)
- Education: University of Warsaw
- Scientific career
- Fields: Geography
- Workplaces: Jagiellonian University

Ludwik Zejszner born Ludwig Zeuschner (c. 1805 – 3 January 1871) was a Prussian geologist, paleontologist and mineralogist. He is considered a pioneer of cartographic approaches to geology. He taught mineralogy at Warsaw and was a specialist on the Tatra Mountains in the Carpathians where he was also involved in conservation.

== Life and work ==
Zeuschner was born in Warsaw in a family of chemists of German descent who had settled in Skwierzyna, near Poznań and served in the court of Poniatowski as a court pharmacist. He graduated in 1822 from Linde High School (Lycaeum) and went to the University of Warsaw. In 1824 he went to Berlin, while also attending lectures in Göttingen and Heidelberg including those of Humboldt and Hegel. He received a doctorate in 1829 from Heidelberg with a dissertation on chemical mixtures in crystallization. Returning to Poland he took the Polish form of his surname Zejszner and joined the newly formed Mineralogy Department at the Jagiellonian University, working there until 1833 when he was dismissed during the November Uprising. He became a mines director at Krakow serving until 1837 and returned in 1848 to the Jagiellonian University. He collaborated with other geologists both inside in Poland like Wincenty Pol and from outside including visitors to the Carpathians like Roderick Murchison. He was employed by the Warsaw Government geological department for which he made explorations and geological maps. From 1829–1856 he was involved in research in the Tatra Mountains and produced numerous research papers. In 1849 he visited Vistula and Barania Góra. In 1857 he worked at the Medical Surgical Academy and in 1861 he worked on a geological map of the Świętokrzyskie Mountains region between Sandomierz and Kielce. Shortly after the fall of Krakow, he was murdered but the motive was never identified and it was speculated to be political. He was buried in Rakowicki Cemetery.

A major publication was a textbook on mineralogy, but his landmark work was the geological map of the Świętokrzyskie Mountains made in 9 sheets and Paleontologia Polska (1846). He noted former glacial cover in the Tatra mountains and explored hot springs in the area.
