= List of mountains in Slovakia =

Map of Slovakia.

This is a list of mountains in Slovakia, that contains all mountains in the Slovak Republic sorted by alphabetical order.

The most predominant mountain regions in Slovakia are the Carpathians. Slovakia is a landlocked Central European country, with more mountainous regions in the north and flat terrain in the south.

== Highest peaks ==
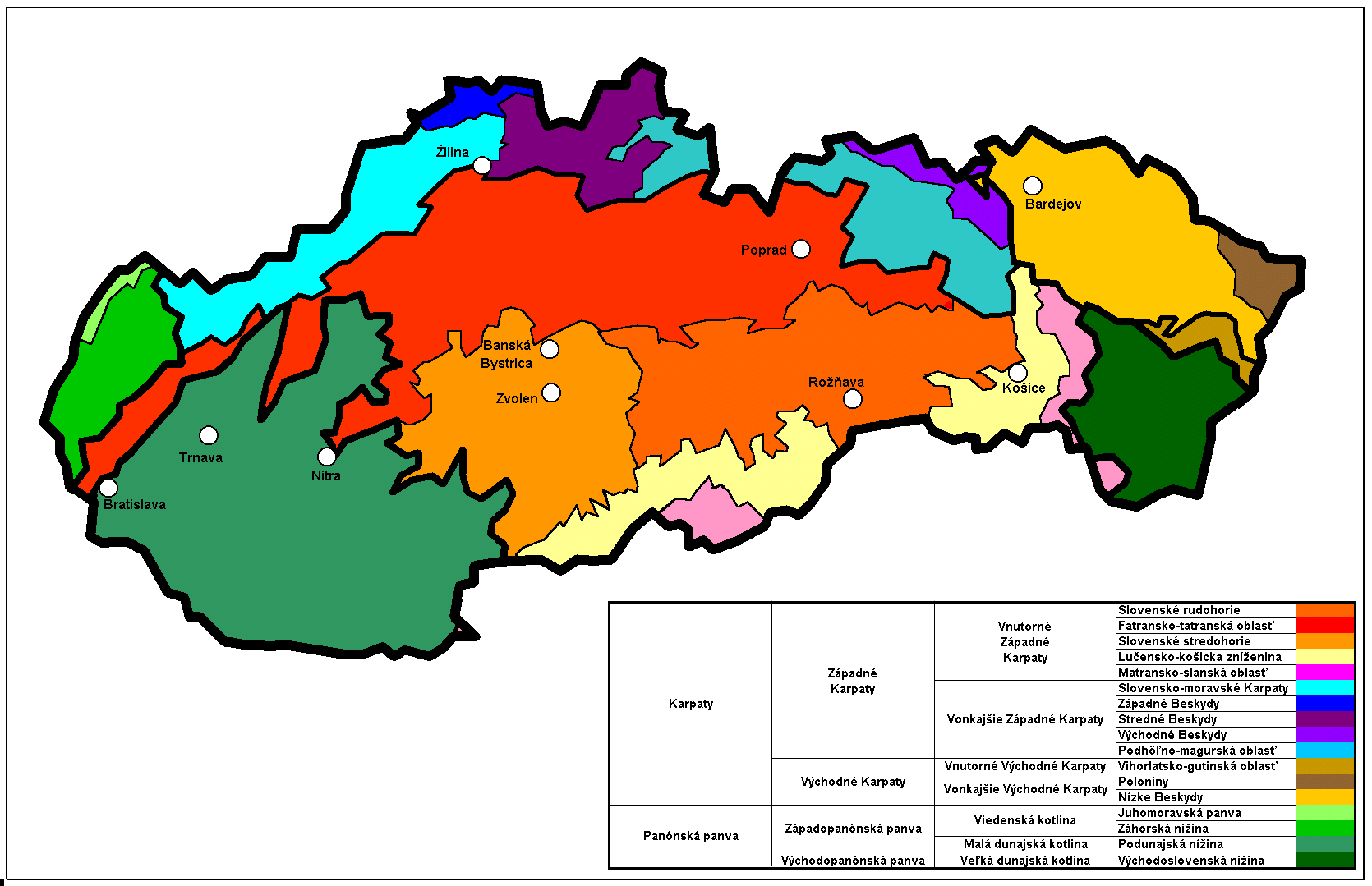
Geomorphological divisions of Slovakia.

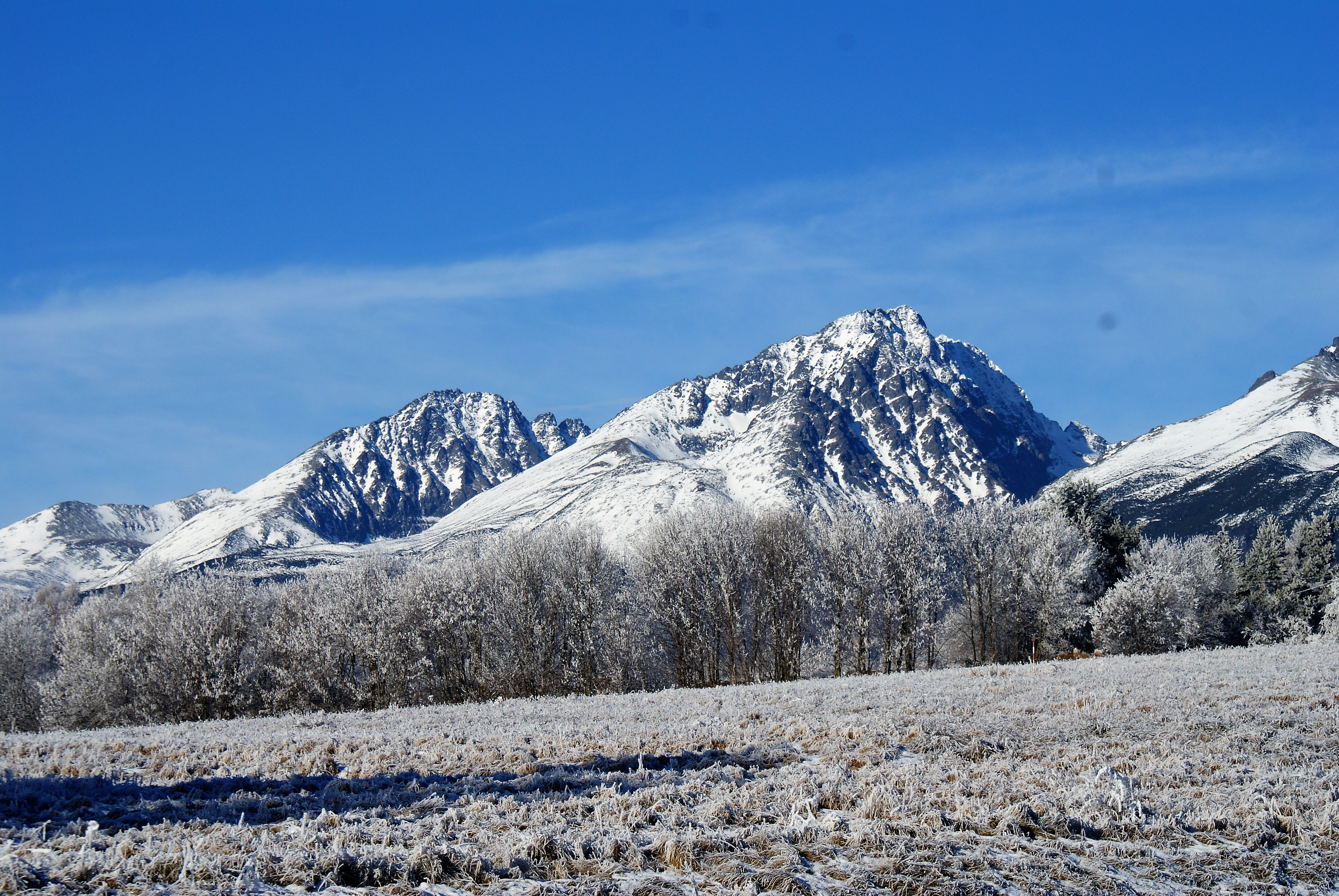
Gerlachovský štít.

Around 8,489 named mountains shape the landscape of Slovakia, which covers an area of 49,035 square kilometers (18,933 square miles), with peaks distributed throughout nearly the entire country, excluding the southwestern corner. Gerlachovský štít stands as Slovakia's highest and most distinguished mountain, reaching an elevation of 2,655 meters (8,711 feet) and a prominence of 2,356 meters (7,730 feet), ranking it among the ten tallest mountains in the Carpathian range.

The Tatra Mountains, with 29 peaks higher than 2,500 metres (8,202 feet) AMSL, are the highest mountain range in the Carpathian Mountains. The Tatras occupy an area of 750 square kilometres (290 sq mi), of which the greater part 600 square kilometres (232 sq mi) lies in Slovakia. They are divided into several parts.

== List of mountains ==
Name	Image	Height (m)	Height (ft)	Location	Range	Note
Gerlachovský štít		2,654	8,709	Prešov Region	High Tatras	Tallest mountain in Slovakia.
Cubryna		2,376	7,975	Polish/Slovak border	High Tatras	One of the highest peaks in Poland.
Bystrá		2,248	7,375	Žilina Region	Western Tatras	Highest mountain in the Western Tatras.
Baníkov		2,178	7,146	Žilina Region	Western Tatras	
Czerwone Wierchy		2,122	6,962	Polish/Slovak border	Western Tatras	
Ciemniak		2,096	6,877	Polish/Slovak border	Western Tatras	Slovak sources list its elevation as 2,090 m.
Chopok		2,024	6,640	Žilina Region	Low Tatra	Third highest peak of the Low Tatra range.
Dereše		2,004	6,575	Žilina Region	Low Tatras	
Babia Góra		1,725	5,659	Polish/Slovak border	Żywiec Beskids	
Borišov		1,509	4,952	Martin	Veľká Fatra	
Stratenec		1,509	4,951	Žilina Region	Malá Fatra	
Drieňok		1,268	4,160	Turčianske Teplice	Veľká Fatra	
Black Mountain		1,029	3,376	Košice Region	Slovak Ore Mountains	
Devínska Kobyla		514	1,686	Bratislava	Little Carpathians	Highest point of Bratislava.
Albínovská hora		177	581	Sečovce	Eastern Slovak Hills	
