= Ornak =

Mountain ridge in the Western Tatras, Poland

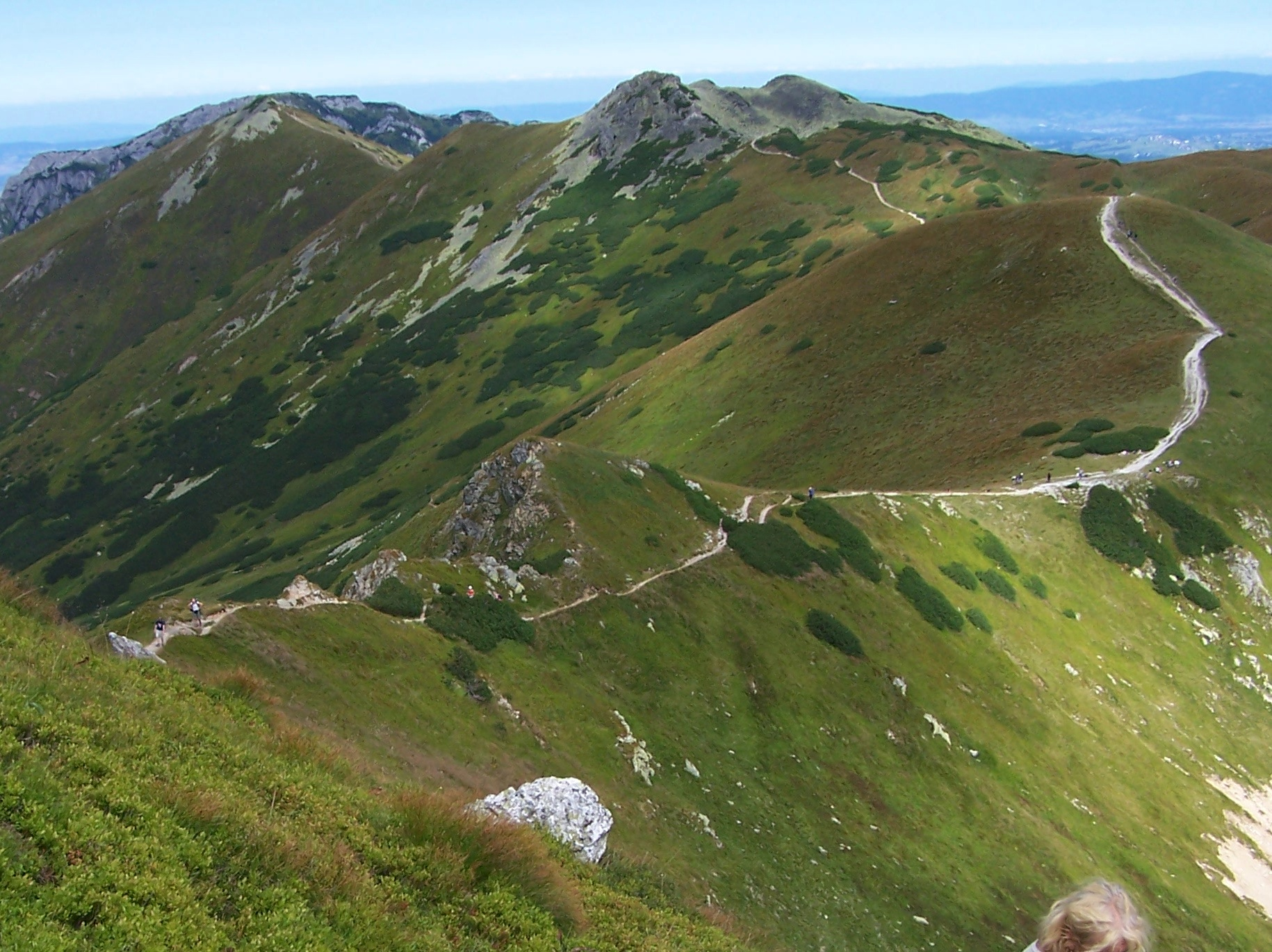
- Ornak ridge

Highest point
- Elevation: 1,867 m (6,125 ft)

Geography
- Location within Poland
- Country: Poland
- Region(s): Gmina Kościelisko, Lesser Poland Voivodeship
- Range coordinates: 49°13′01.15″N 19°50′00.22″E

Geology
- Mountain type: Mountain ridge

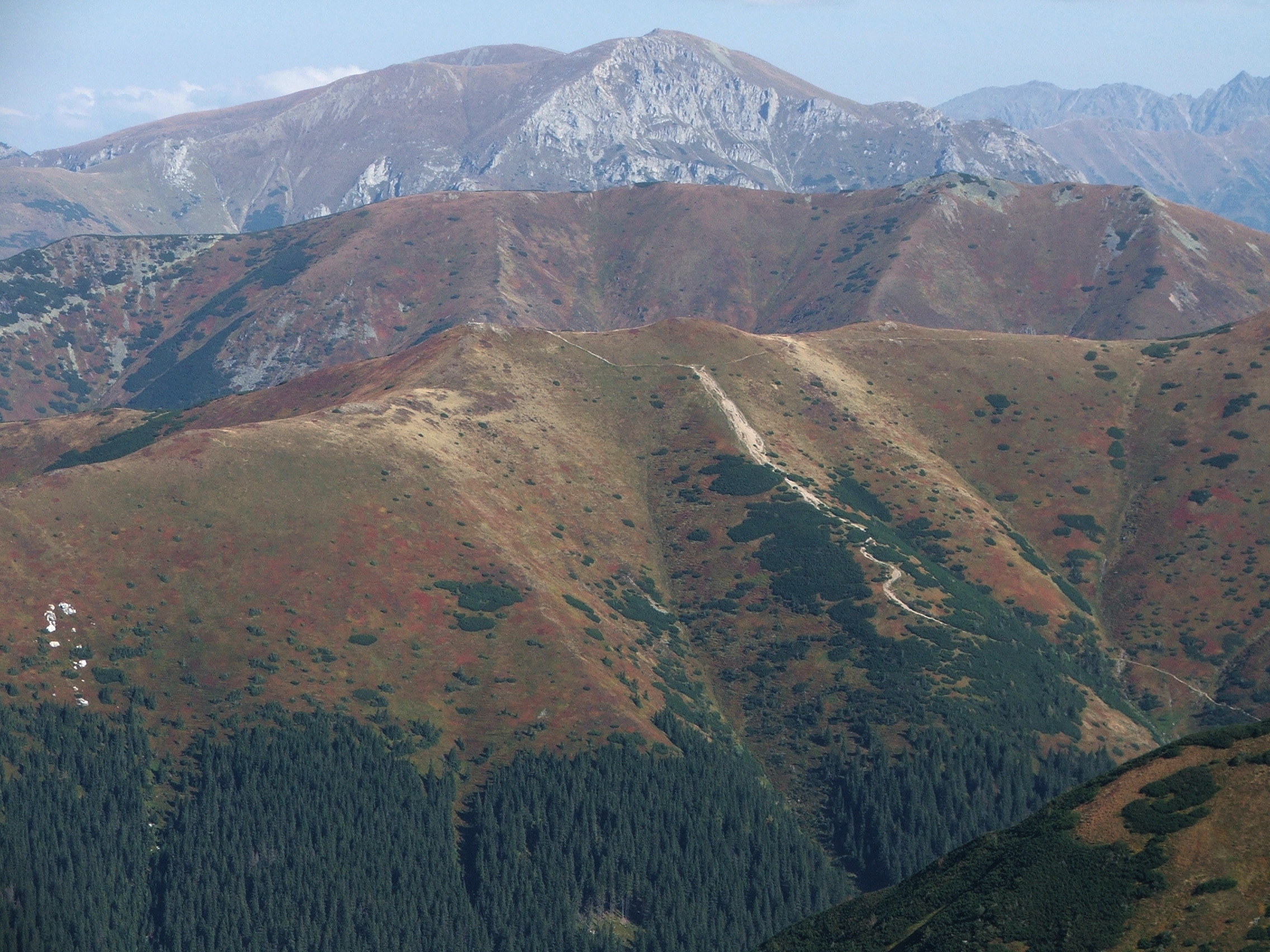
From top: Ciemniak, Ornak, Trzydniowiański Wierch

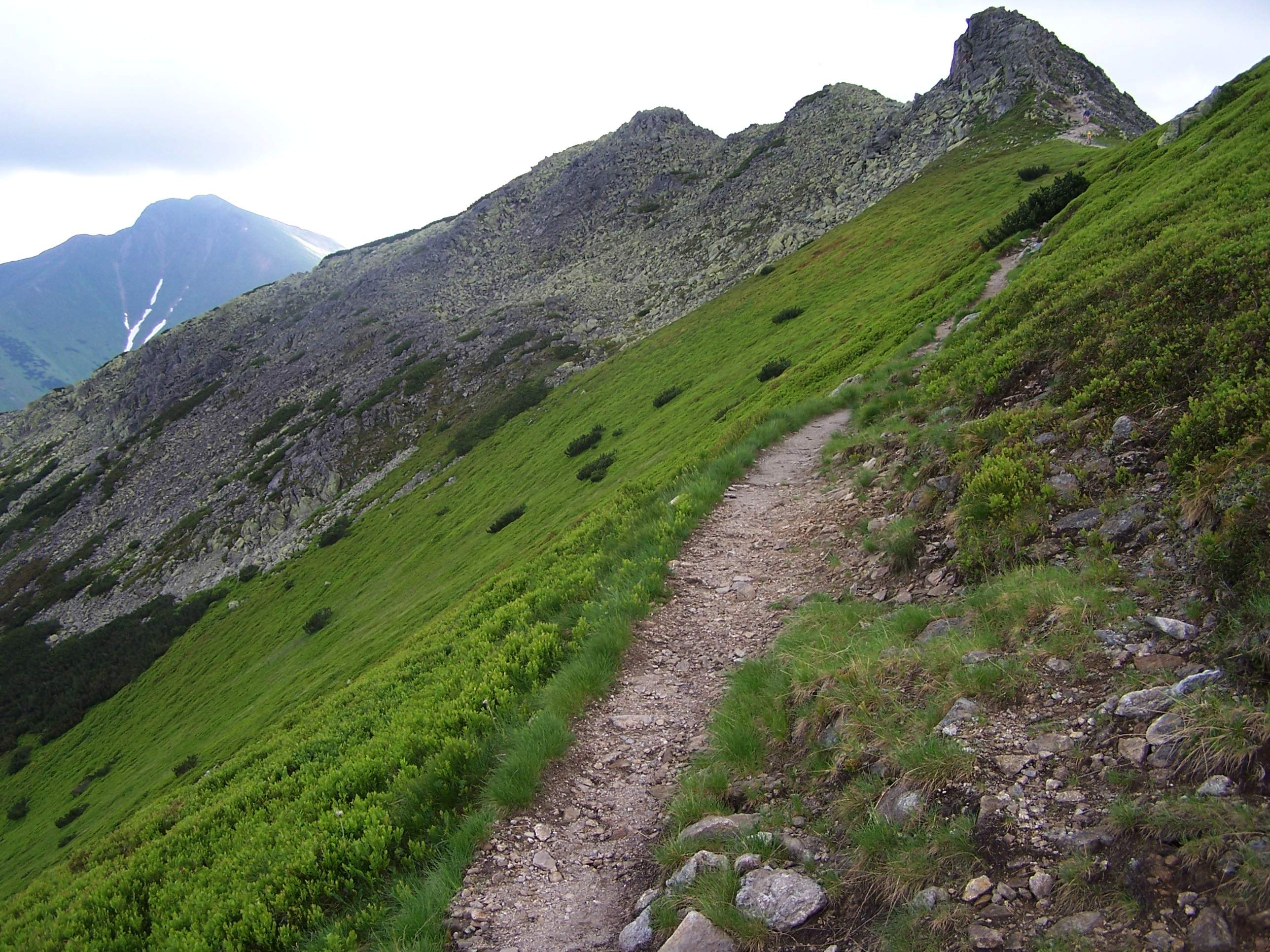
Eastern slopes of Ornak, with Kamienista in the background

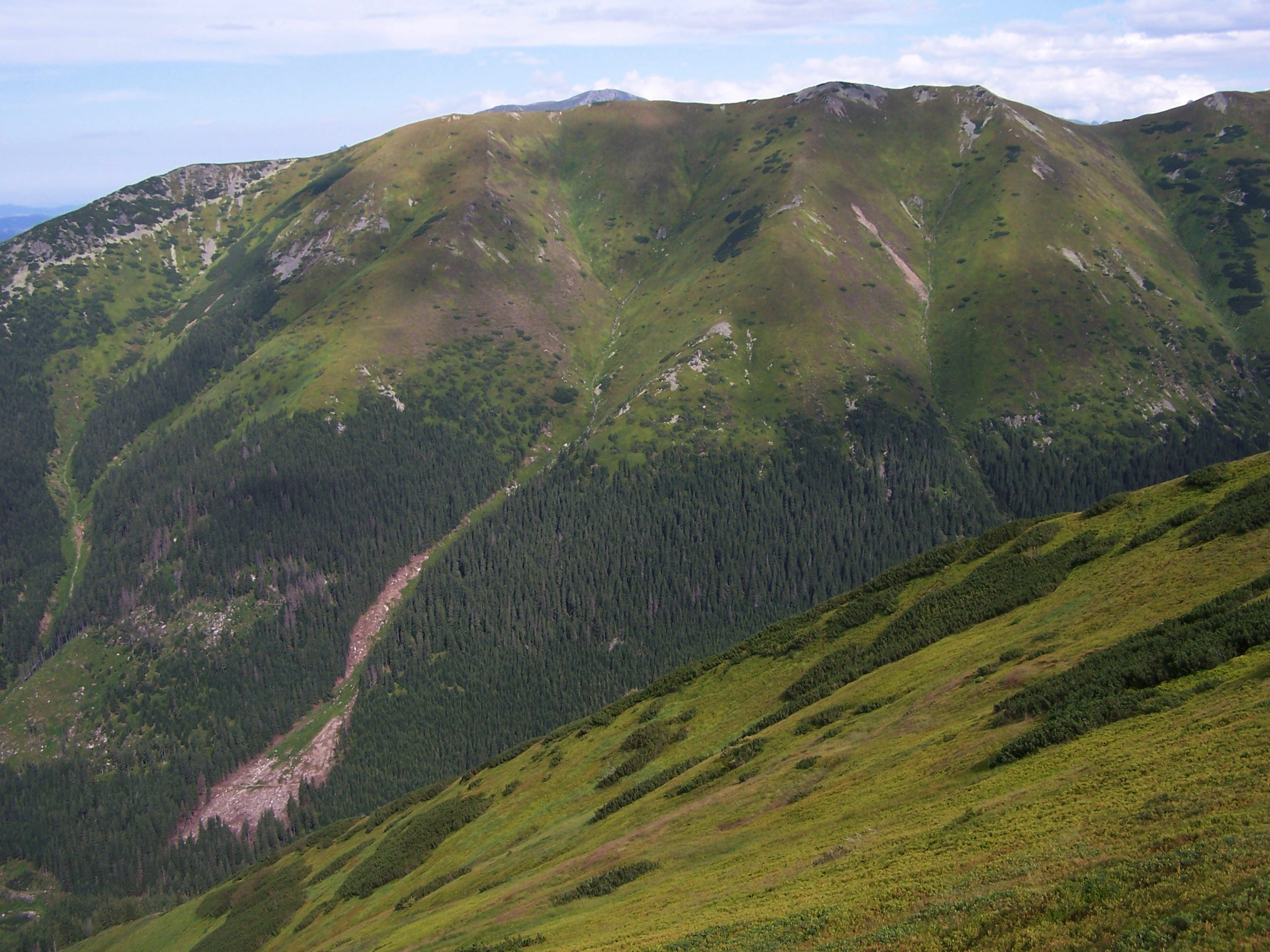
Western slopes of Ornak

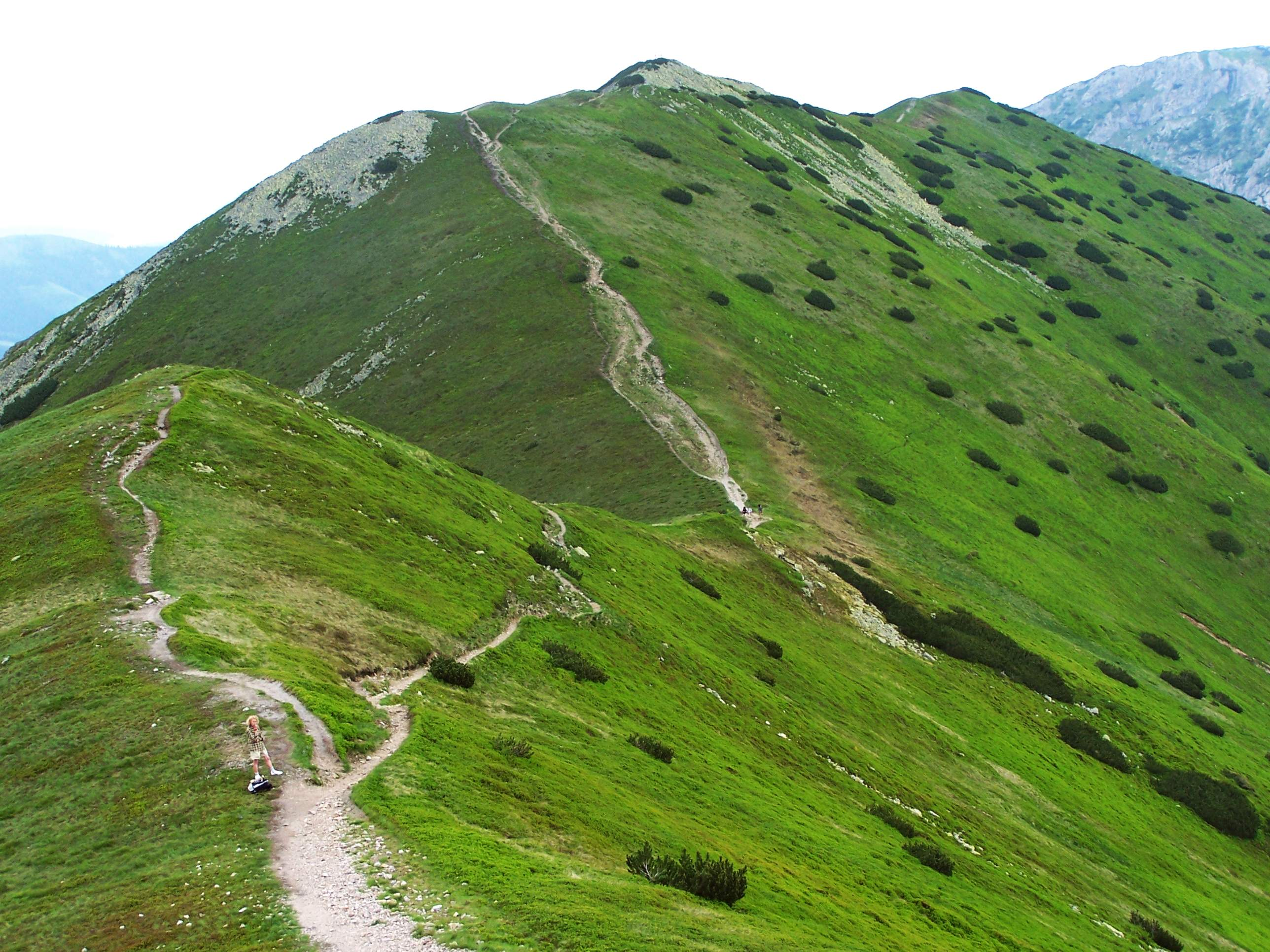
Ornak ridge

Ornak is a mountain ridge, part of the northern arête of Siwy Zwornik in the Polish Western Tatras. It separates Starorobociańska Valley from Pyszniańska Valley.

== Origin of the name ==
The origin of the name Ornak is unknown. In 16th-century mining documents, it appears as Hornok. The ridge likely took its name from Hala Ornak, a former pasture on its slopes. According to folk etymology, the name derives from the Podhale dialect word oreł (eagle), tied to a legend of an eagle carrying a seven-year-old boy aloft and dropping him to his death. However, the true etymology of the pasture and ridge remains unclear.

== Topography ==
Ornak is a lateral branch of the main Tatra arête, extending from between Klin and Błyszcz at the minor peak of Siwy Zwornik. The long, massive ridge runs north from Siwa Pass to Iwaniacka Pass, with several peaks: Kotłowa Czuba (1,840 m), Zadni Ornak (1,867 m), Ornak (1,854 m), and Suchy Wierch Ornaczański (1,832 m). These are separated by small passes: Kotłowe Siodło, Ornaczańska Pass, and Wyżnia Ornaczańska Pass.

The ridge rises between 500 and 700 m above the surrounding valleys. The eastern slopes host the former Hala Ornak pasture. Several couloirs descend into Starorobociańska Valley, including Banisty Couloir, Pośredni Couloir, Graniczniak Couloir, Na Przełęcz Couloir, and Pod Pyszną Couloir. Into Pyszniańska Valley, couloirs include Piszczałki, Ornaczański Couloir, and the well-known Pod Banie Couloir. These couloirs are prone to avalanches in winter.

== Description ==
Much of the Ornak ridge is exposed, offering expansive views, particularly of nearby Kominiarski Wierch, the Tomanowa and Pyszniańska valleys, and peaks like Ciemniak, Tomanowy Wierch Polski, Smreczyński Wierch, Kamienista, Błyszcz, and Starorobociański Wierch. The ridge is dangerous during thunderstorms.

Composed of metamorphic rocks with some granite, the peak and northern sections feature quartzite sandstone. Since the 15th century, the massif hosted mines extracting colored metals, and from the 17th century, iron ore. Shepherds and miners frequented the area, with the first recorded winter ascents in 1910. The grassy ridge supports granite-loving flora, including Oreochloa disticha, Oreojuncus trifidus, numerous lichens, and northern firmoss. In spring, alpine bellflower, alpine pasqueflower, and other Tatra plants bloom profusely. Rare Polish species include Pedicularis hacquetii, few-flowered sedge, Erigeron hungaricus, and Bigelow's sedge. On the western slopes of Suchy Wierch Ornaczański (Baniste), the westernmost known natural stand of Swiss pine in the Polish Tatras is found.

== Hiking trails ==
- Green trail: from Iwaniacka Pass along the entire Ornak ridge, via Siwa Pass and Siwe Turnie to Liliowy Karb pass. Time: 2 h 20 min, ↓ 1 h 55 min.
- Black trail: to Siwa Pass from Chochołowska Valley via Starorobociańska Valley. Time: 2 h 30 min, ↓ 2 h.
