= Klemens Bachleda =

Polish mountain guide

Klimek Bachleda
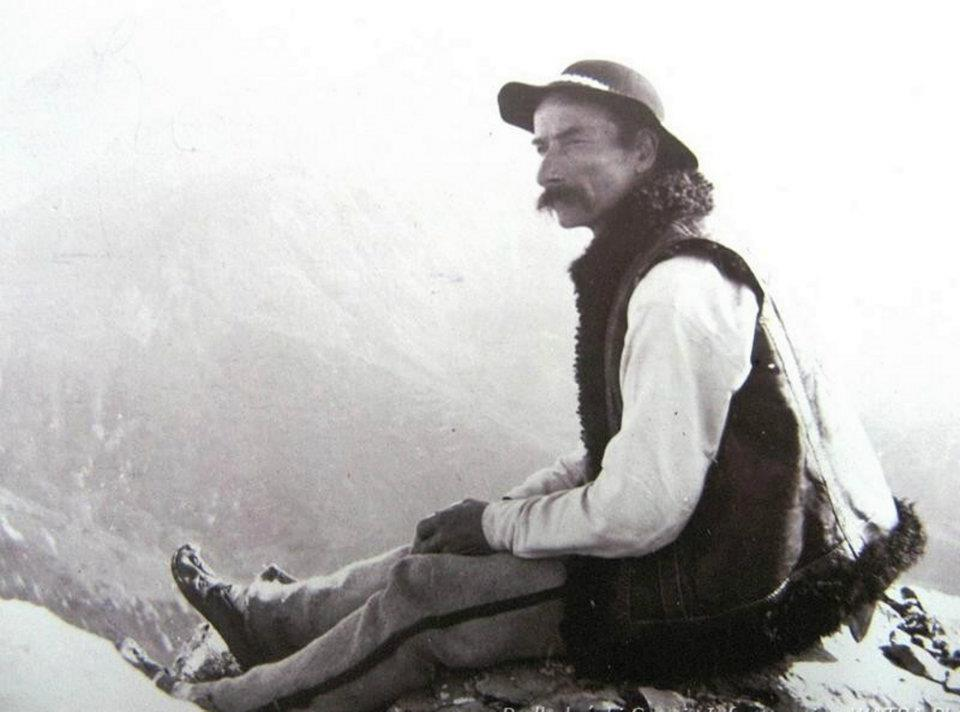
- Born: 13 November 1851; Kościelisko, Austrian Poland
- Died: 6 August 1910 (aged 58); Mały Jaworowy Szczyt, High Tatras, Austria-Hungary
- Cause of death: Rockfall, while attempting a mountain rescue
- Burial place: Nowy Cmentarz w Zakopanem, Zakopane
- Occupations: Mountain guide Mountain rescuer

Klemens "Klimek" Bachleda (13 November 1851 - 6 August 1910) was a pioneering Polish mountain guide and mountain rescuer in Austria-Hungary. He died during an unsuccessful mountain rescue attempt in the High Tatras.

== Biography ==
=== Early and personal life ===
The name of Bachleda's father is unknown. His mother was Zofia Bachleda Galian. He was a Goral, an ethnographic group which inhabits the Tatra Mountains on both sides of the modern border between Poland and Slovakia. She died when he was twelve, leaving him an orphan.

He earned a living as a shepherd-boy in the high mountains. He later went to Upper Hungary to find work, where he was called up for military service. (Note: During Bachleda's lifetime, both present-day Slovakia and the south-west of present-day Poland were within the Austro-Hungarian Empire.) In 1873, he was discharged, and returned to Zakopane. It was in the grip of a cholera epidemic, and he tended the sick and buried the dead. Thereafter, he supported himself by working as a carpenter, and also by hunting. (Note: According to some of the sources, his hunting was unlawful; i.e., it was poaching. It is doubtful as to whether or not the local inhabitants paid much attention to the legality or otherwise of their traditional pursuits, and as to whether or nor the local authorities were inclined to prosecute breaches of any such law.)

He married Agnieszka Styrczula from Dzianisz, and they had three children. She died, and he remarried.

=== Mountain guide ===
During the late 19th century, mountaineering became a popular pastime for young people from the middle and upper classes across Europe. Men with local knowledge were in demand as guides, and could be well paid. Bachleda took up that profession, initially as assistant to experienced guides such as Maciej Sieczka (1824-1897), Szymon Tatar (1828 or 1832 - 1913) and the two Jędrzej Walas, father (1820-1896) and son (1841-1900).

In 1886, he was recognised as a Class I guide. In 1898, Jędrzej Wala the younger retired. From then on, Bachleda was called Królem Przewodników Tatrzańskich ('King of the Tatra Guides') and Orzeł Tatr ('Eagle of the Tatras'). He is said to have had outstanding qualities of character: tact, minimisation of risk, courage, consideration, self-sacrifice, helpfulness, diligence and honesty.

His clients included: Tadeusz Boy-Żeleński (1874-1941, writer, poet, critic and translator), Janusz Chmielowski (1878-1968, mechanical engineer and mathematician), Edmund Cięglewicz (1862-1928, journalist and translator), Stanisław Eljasz-Radzikowski (1869-1935, physician, painter and folklorist), Jan Fischer (1873-1942, merchant), Walenty Gadowski (1861-1956, priest), Ferdynand Hoesick (1867-1941, writer and publisher), Mieczysław Karłowicz (1876-1909, composer and conductor), Franciszek Nowicki (1864-1935, poet and political activist), Karol Potkański (1861-1907, historian), Kazimierz Przerwa-Tetmajer (1865-1940, poet and novelist) and Henryk Sienkiewicz (1846-1916, journalist, novelist and Nobel laureate).

He had a talent for orienting himself in difficult, rocky areas, and for mountaineering. He pioneered several routes in the Tatras. These included the descent of the northern wall of Lomnický štít (1888), and the first ascents of, among others, Staroleśny Szczyt (1892), Ganek (1895), Rumanowy Szczyt (1902), Kaczy Szczyt (1904), Zadni Mnich (1904) and Kozie Czuby (1904). He made the second ascents of Mnich and Żabi Koń. He took part in the first winter ascents of Żleb Karczmarza (1905) (below Gerlachovský štít, the highest peak in the High Tatras), and of Bystrá (the highest peak in the Western Tatras). He climbed in groups roped together from as early as 1900. He was the first Tatra highlander to learn to ski (no later than 1902).

In 1901, Károly Jordan (1871-1959, mathematician and statistician) named Klimkowa Przełęcz (Slovak: Bachledova štrbina), one of the passes between Durny Szczyt and Lomnický štít, in Bachleda's honour. He has more than ten (one source says fifteen) features in the Tatras named after him, including Klimkowa Turnia, the easternmost peak of Staroleśny Szczyt. (Note: Others include Klimkowe Wrótka (a saddle), Klimkowy Żleb (Durny Szczyt) (a couloir), and Klimkowy Żleb (Staroleśny Szczyt) (a couloir).) In 1903, the recently founded Sekcja Turystyczna Towarzystwa Tatrzańskiego ('Tourist Section of the Tatra Society') rewarded him for discovering a new pass through the main ridge of the Tatras, namely Wschodnia Batyżowiecka Przełęcz.

=== Mountain rescuer ===
In 1909, Mariusz Zaruski (1867–1941, Polish soldier and sportsman) founded Tatrzańskie Ochotnicze Pogotowie Ratunkowe (TOPR, 'Tatra Volunteer Search and Rescue'). Bachleda became his deputy, and one of its most active and dedicated members.

On 6 August 1910, Stanisław Szulakiewicz and Jan Jarzyna (1892-1960, competition skier and ski jumper), both students, attempted the northern wall of Mały Jaworowy Szczyt. They fell, and Szulakiewicz suffered serious injuries. Jarzyna managed to descend and to seek help. Zaruski organised a rescue party. Conditions were atrocious: a violent thunderstorm, and heavy rain mixed with snow and hail. After hours of climbing, the party, nearly exhausted, had reached to about 50–70 m (160–230 ft) from where Szulakiewicz lay, and could hear him calling out. Zaruski ordered a halt because of the risk to life. Bachleda unroped himself, and continued on alone. He did not return.

On 7 August, a second unsuccessful attempt was made to rescue Szulakiewicz.

On 8 August, a third attempt reached Szulakiewicz. He had died, probably on the night of 6–7 August, from injuries and exposure. The weather worsened, and the five-strong rescue party was trapped on the mountain overnight. They brought the body down on 9 August.

Bachleda's comrades hoped that he had found another way down. Rain, wind and fog hampered their searches. On 13 August, their worst fears were confirmed: they found his body. He had been caught in a rockfall, and lay in Wyżnia Rówienkowa Przełęcz, a high mountain pass. On 15 August, they began to bring him down. On 17 August, he was buried in the New Cemetery in Zakopane. His gravestone bears the Polish-language inscription, Poświęcił się i zginął ('He sacrificed himself and died'). He was the first member of TOPR to die during a rescue attempt.

There is a detailed account of the double tragedy on the TOPR website.

== Legacy ==
A commemorative plaque was placed at Dolina Jaworowa, a valley below the place where he died. It has since been moved to Tatrzański Cmentarz Symboliczny ('Tatra Symbolic Cemetery') on the western slopes of Osterwa. (Note: It is a symbolic cemetery because no-one is buried there; rather, it is a memorial to those who have died in the Tatras, and to people associated with the Tatras who have died on other mountains.) There is a memorial plaque at Dworzec Tatrzański, Zakopane. Ulica Klimka Bachledy ('Klimek Bachleda Street') in Zakopane is named after him.

He is mentioned in the memoirs of Janusz Chmielowski (1878-1968, mechanical engineer and mathematician; who called Bachleda 'one of the most important figures in the history of Zakopane in the late nineteenth and early twentieth century') and of Mieczysław Karłowicz, and in poems by Stanisław Gąsienica-Byrcyn (1911-1991, poet and writer, son of a Tatra guide and mountain rescuer), Jan Kasprowicz (1860-1926, poet, playwright, critic and translator), Zygmunt Lubertowicz (1883-1958, teacher, poet, writer, publicist, and social, cultural and tourist activist), Stanisław Nędza-Kubiniec (1897-1976, poet and writer), and Mieczysław Opałek (1881-1964, historian, poet, bibliophile, cultural researcher, journalist and educator). Księga Tatr ('The Book of the Tatra', 1955) by Jalu Kurek (1904-1983, poet and writer) is a novelised account of Bachleda's life. In 1959, the play Klimek Bachleda (Orzeł Tatr) ('Klimek Bachleda (Eagle of the Tatras)') by Julian Reimschüssel (1908-1984, teacher and writer) was performed in Zakopane. The part of Bachleda was played by Józef Gąsienica Wawrytko (1889-1971, Tatra guide and mountain rescuer).

== Gallery ==
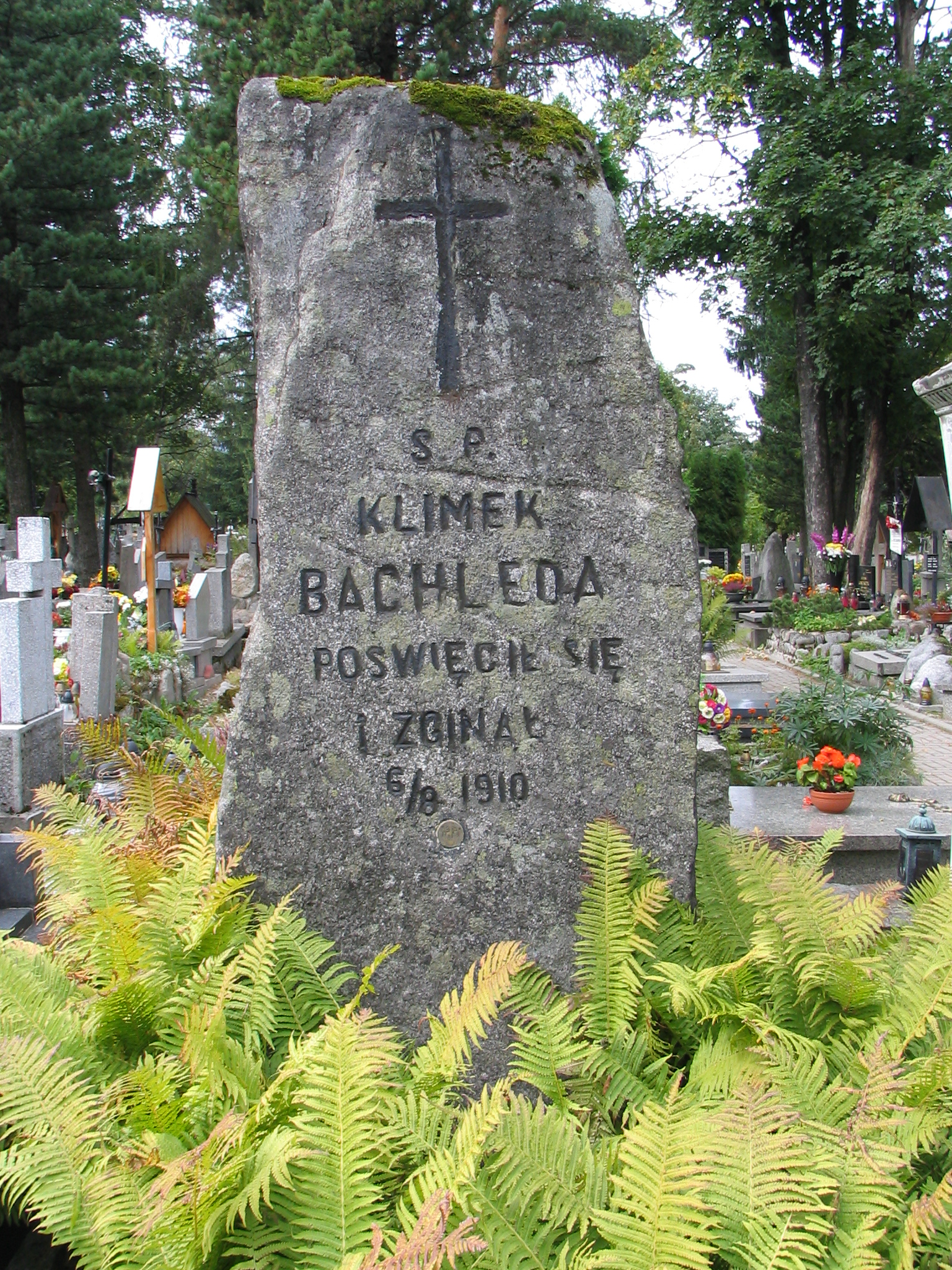
Gravestone, Zakopane

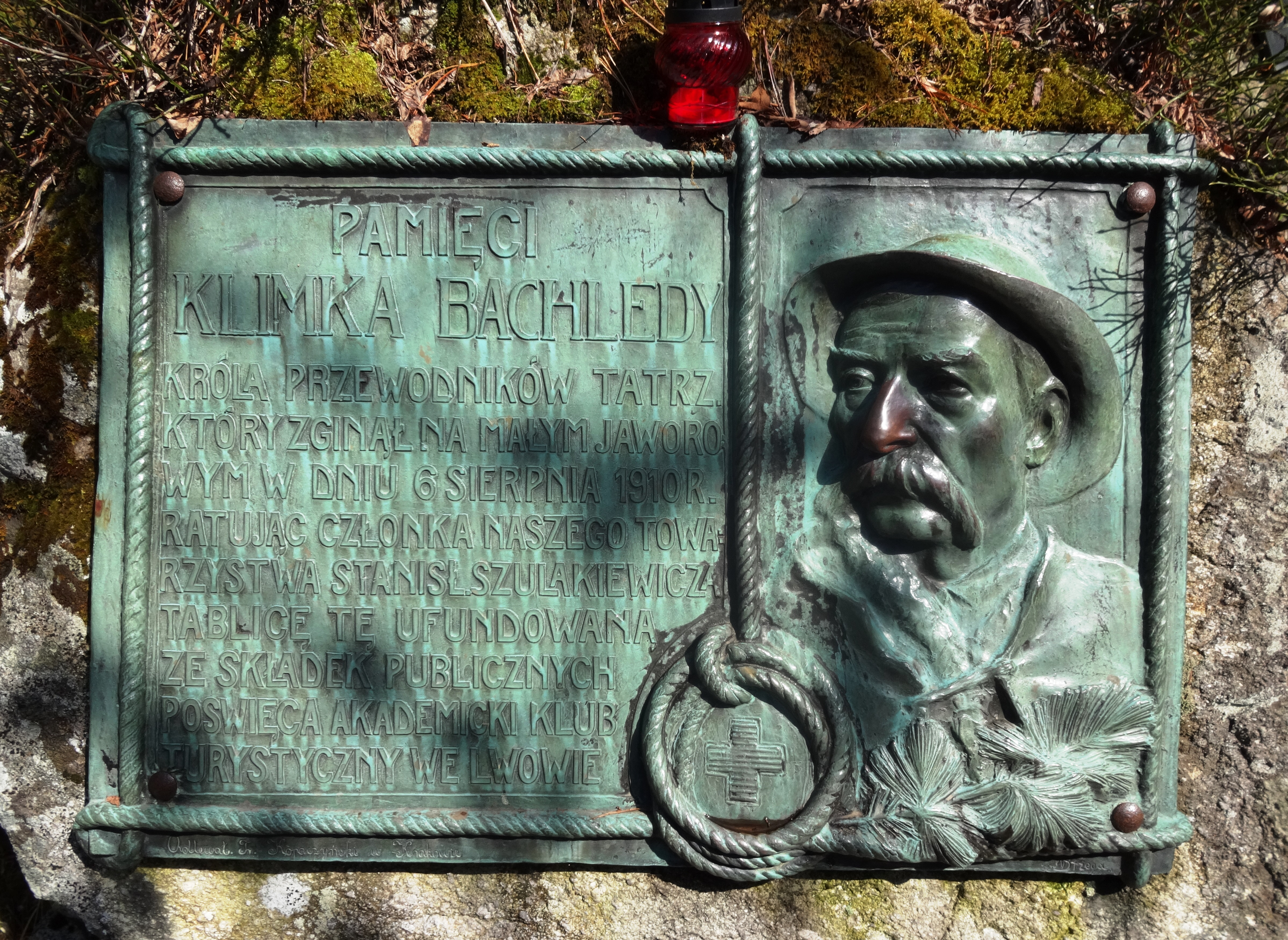
Memorial, Tatrzański Cmentarz Symboliczny

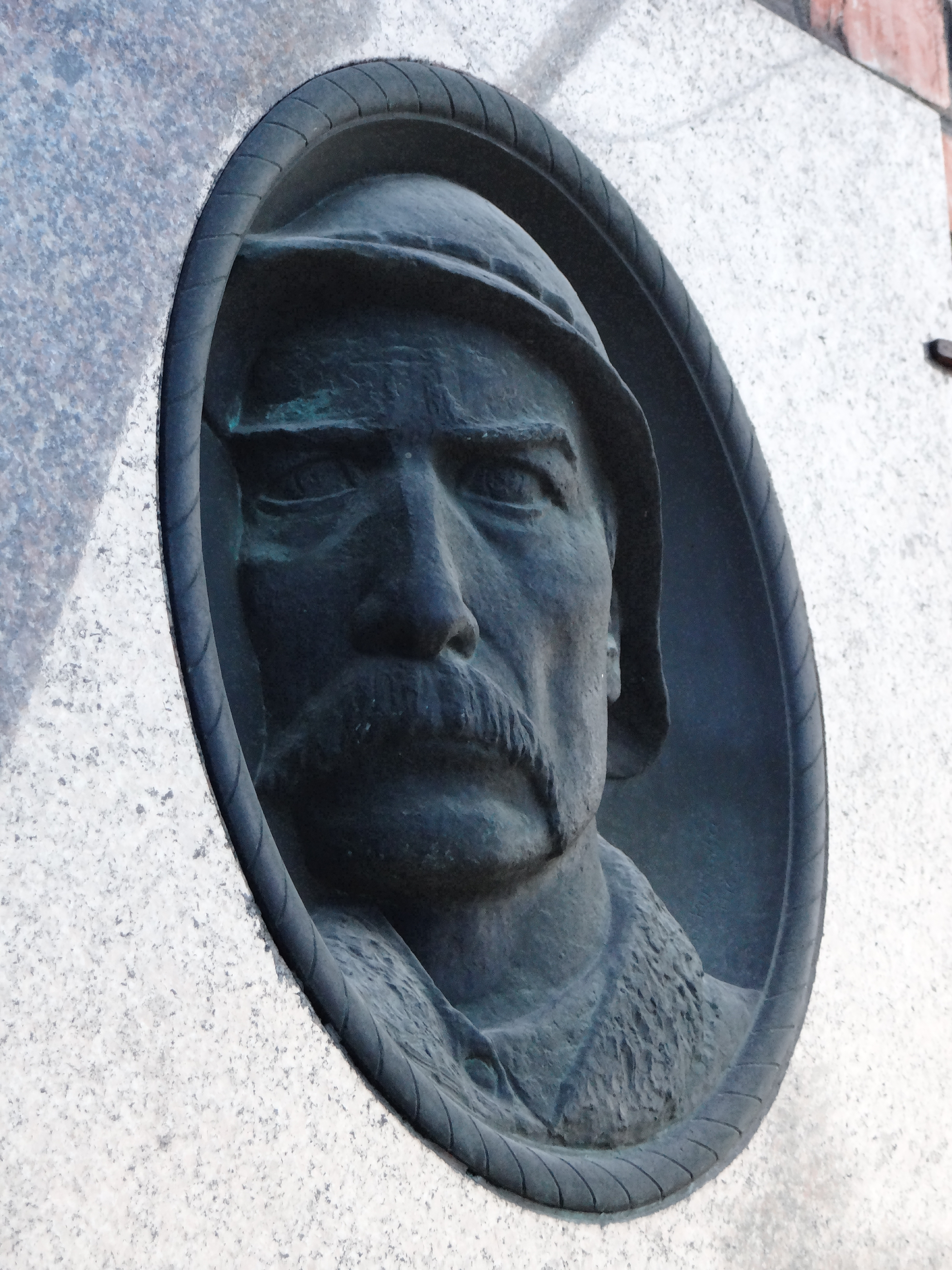
Commemorative plaque, Zakopane
