= Goryczkowa Czuba =

Mountain in Slovakia and Poland

- Goričková kopa Goričková
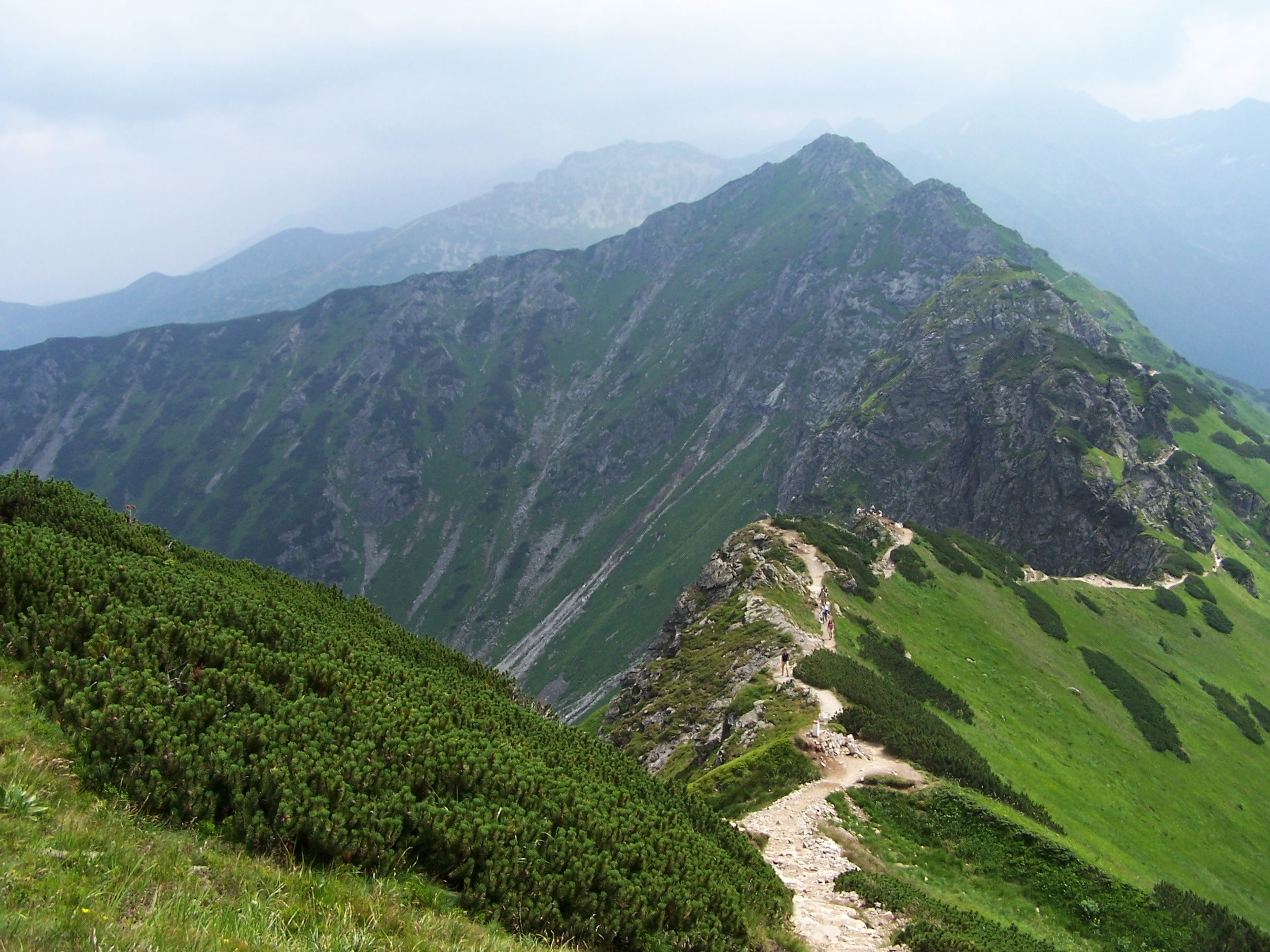

Highest point
- Elevation: 1,911 m (6,270 ft)
- Prominence: 111 m (364 ft)
- Coordinates: 49°13′57″N 19°57′25″E

Geography
- Countries: Poland and Slovakia
- Regions: Lesser Poland and Prešov
- Parent range: Western Tatras, Tatra Mountains

Goryczkowa Czuba (Slovak: Goričková kopa / Goričková) is a mountain located in the Western Tatra mountain range on the border between Poland and Slovakia. It is situated on the main ridge of the Tatras west of Kasprowy Wierch and east of Czerwone Wierchy. A tourist trail runs along the ridge.

The mountain's name comes from Goryczka, a local surname, which is also the Polish word for gentiana. Despite this similarity, no significant quantities of the flower can be found in the vicinity.
