= Kasprowy Wierch =

Mountain in Poland

- Kasprov vrch Kasper Peak
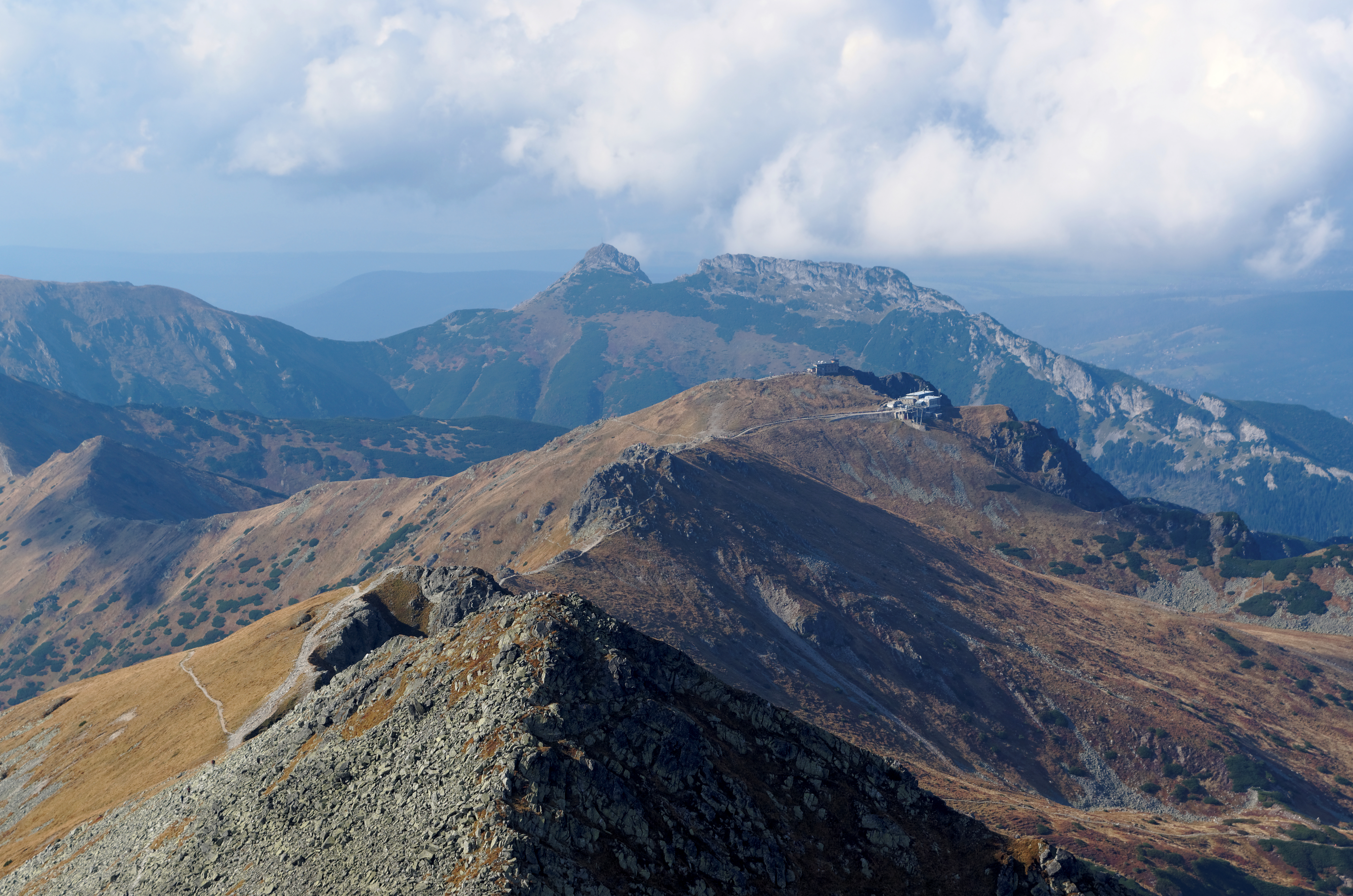
- View of Kasprowy Wierch and Giewont from Świnica peak

Highest point
- Elevation: 1,987 m (6,519 ft)
- Listing: Mountains of Poland
- Coordinates: 49°13′55″N 19°58′55″E

Geography
- Location within Poland Location within Lesser Poland Voivodeship Location within Prešov Region Location within Slovakia
- Countries: Poland; Slovakia
- Parent range: Western Tatras

Climbing
- First ascent: First winter tourist ascent by Poles: Klemens Bachleda and Karol Potkański in c. 1890

Kasprowy Wierch (Polish pronunciation: [kasˈprɔvɨ ˈvjɛrx]; Slovak: Kasprov vrch; sometimes in English Kasper Peak) is a peak of a long crest in the Western Tatras, one of Poland's main winter ski areas. Its dominant southern crests mark the border with Slovakia. It is accessible in most conditions by foot and daily by cablecar.

== History ==
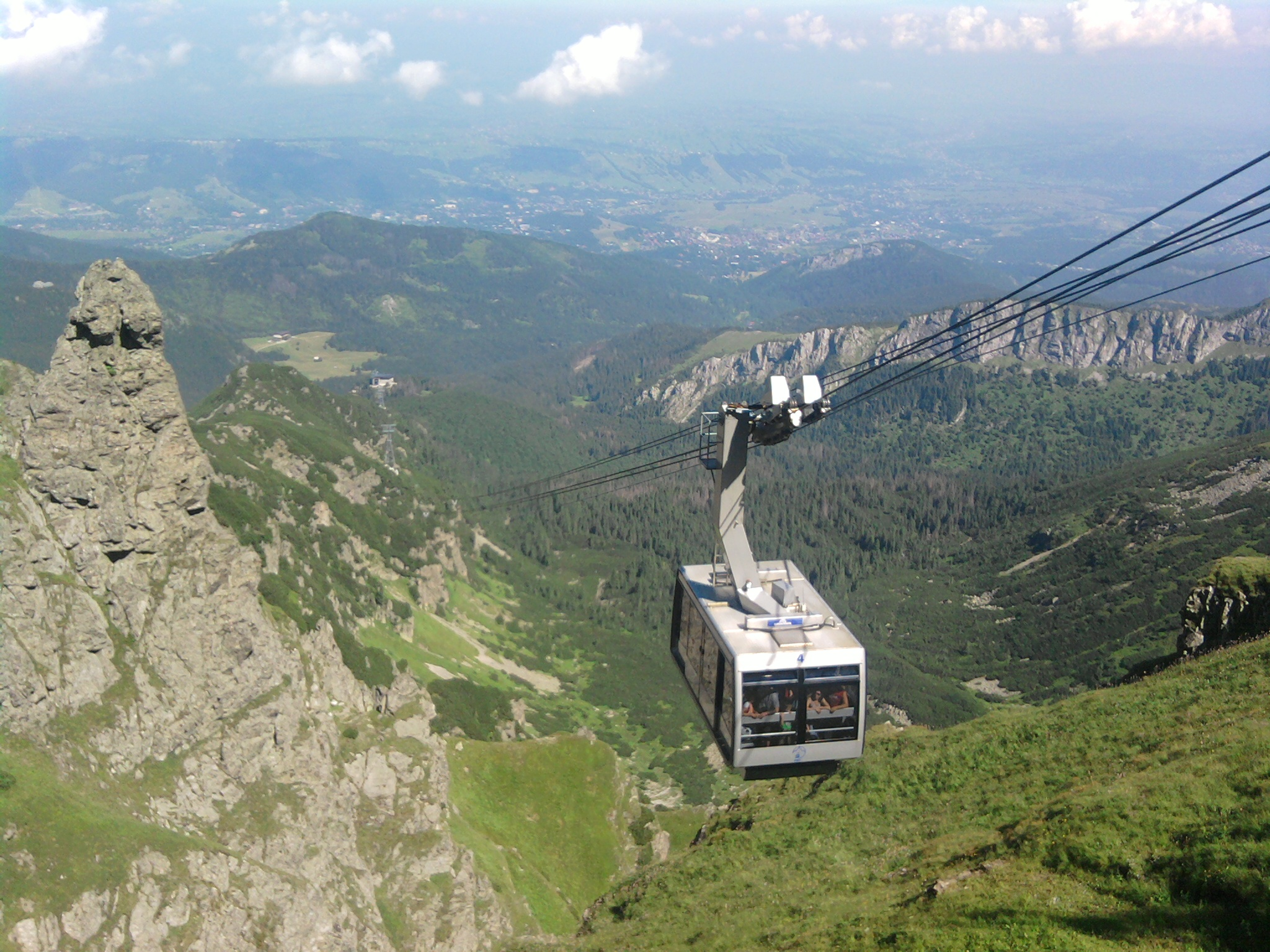
Kasprowy Wierch Cableway

From 1910 onwards Kasprowy Wierch became very popular among ski tourists so much so an aerial tramway or téléphérique, reaching almost to the summit, was built between 1935 and 1936 as such it is one of the oldest in Europe. As part of its modernization, the cabin aerial ropeway was closed for a period until December 2007. In 1938 meteorological observatory were built here. One of the faint Kordylewski clouds, at or circling the L_{4} and L_{5} Lagrange points of the Moon, was first photographed at the summit by astronomer Kazimierz Kordylewski in 1961.

== Geography ==
The mountain is at the crossroads of four crests, two of which coincide with footpaths, incorporating steps, bounding Poland and Slovakia and in times without snow the steep paths heading into both countries south and north are quite easily traversable. The peak itself is just north of the border, which is deemed to be a straight line relative to the two dominant ridges.

Crossing the border between Poland and Slovakia is not restricted, since both countries are members of the Schengen area. Users of the cable car change cars midway in their ascent/descent, at Mount Myślenicke Turnie. At the top station is a restaurant and information office building with further ski lifts outside.

The mountain is popular among hikers from Poland, because of its easy accessibility, both on foot and by the cable car. However, it is much less visited from the Slovak side, because the ascent from the nearest settlement in Slovakia involves a lengthy (17 km) approach up a remote valley Tichá dolina.

=== Climate ===
Without the existence of a summer, the climate is of tundra (Köppen: ET), as found in the highest areas of the Alps.

Climate data for Kasprowy Wierch (ridge), elevation 1,991 m or 6,532 ft (1991–2020 normals, extremes 1951–present)
Month	Jan	Feb	Mar	Apr	May	Jun	Jul	Aug	Sep	Oct	Nov	Dec	Year
Record high °C (°F)	8.1 (46.6)	9.9 (49.8)	9.4 (48.9)	14.2 (57.6)	18.7 (65.7)	22.6 (72.7)	23.4 (74.1)	22.5 (72.5)	19.8 (67.6)	16.9 (62.4)	13.9 (57.0)	8.8 (47.8)	23.4 (74.1)
Mean maximum °C (°F)	3.1 (37.6)	2.6 (36.7)	4.1 (39.4)	8.2 (46.8)	13.4 (56.1)	17.9 (64.2)	19.1 (66.4)	18.7 (65.7)	14.4 (57.9)	11.9 (53.4)	7.5 (45.5)	4.6 (40.3)	20.3 (68.5)
Mean daily maximum °C (°F)	−4.6 (23.7)	−5.0 (23.0)	−3.3 (26.1)	1.2 (34.2)	6.0 (42.8)	10.1 (50.2)	12.1 (53.8)	12.3 (54.1)	7.5 (45.5)	3.9 (39.0)	0.0 (32.0)	−3.5 (25.7)	3.1 (37.6)
Daily mean °C (°F)	−7.4 (18.7)	−7.8 (18.0)	−6.1 (21.0)	−1.6 (29.1)	3.0 (37.4)	6.7 (44.1)	8.6 (47.5)	8.9 (48.0)	4.6 (40.3)	1.2 (34.2)	−2.6 (27.3)	−6.1 (21.0)	0.1 (32.2)
Mean daily minimum °C (°F)	−10.1 (13.8)	−10.5 (13.1)	−8.7 (16.3)	−4.0 (24.8)	0.6 (33.1)	4.1 (39.4)	6.0 (42.8)	6.4 (43.5)	2.2 (36.0)	−1.3 (29.7)	−5.1 (22.8)	−8.8 (16.2)	−2.4 (27.7)
Mean minimum °C (°F)	−19.2 (−2.6)	−19.4 (−2.9)	−16.3 (2.7)	−12.5 (9.5)	−6.3 (20.7)	−2.2 (28.0)	0.0 (32.0)	0.1 (32.2)	−4.1 (24.6)	−9.8 (14.4)	−13.7 (7.3)	−17.6 (0.3)	−21.9 (−7.4)
Record low °C (°F)	−30.2 (−22.4)	−29.1 (−20.4)	−27.9 (−18.2)	−18.1 (−0.6)	−13.0 (8.6)	−7.6 (18.3)	−3.1 (26.4)	−4.5 (23.9)	−8.2 (17.2)	−15.2 (4.6)	−24.8 (−12.6)	−28.0 (−18.4)	−30.2 (−22.4)
Average precipitation mm (inches)	105.1 (4.14)	98.0 (3.86)	112.7 (4.44)	127.3 (5.01)	186.0 (7.32)	208.0 (8.19)	248.1 (9.77)	171.6 (6.76)	158.5 (6.24)	123.4 (4.86)	117.6 (4.63)	107.5 (4.23)	1,763.8 (69.44)
Average extreme snow depth cm (inches)	92.7 (36.5)	130.5 (51.4)	153.3 (60.4)	147.9 (58.2)	67.9 (26.7)	14.4 (5.7)	0.7 (0.3)	1.2 (0.5)	9.0 (3.5)	15.1 (5.9)	27.2 (10.7)	56.1 (22.1)	153.3 (60.4)
Average precipitation days (≥ 0.1 mm)	19.8	18.6	20.2	18.3	21.0	20.0	19.6	16.3	15.6	16.8	17.8	19.0	223.0
Average snowy days (≥ 0 cm)	31	28.3	30.9	30.0	20.6	3.3	0.4	0.4	5.9	13.7	21.3	30.6	216.4
Average relative humidity (%)	77.6	80.5	83.8	84.3	86.8	87.7	86.6	84.5	86.2	80.9	82.0	78.6	83.3
Mean monthly sunshine hours	88.9	91.2	117.1	154.1	157.5	153.8	166.5	179.3	130.8	121.3	83.8	80.7	1,524.8
Percentage possible sunshine	26	29	32	41	39	39	41	46	36	34	25	24	35
Source 1: Institute of Meteorology and Water Management
Source 2: Meteomodel.pl (extremes and humidity)

== Cable cars and chairlifts ==
The cable cars are extremely popular and tourists regularly have to wait up to 3 hours to buy tickets – roughly the same time it would take to ascend the mountain on foot. The cable car service has caused environmental concerns and protests in 1935 and 2006.

In 1961–1962 and in 1967–1968 chairlifts were built on the slopes and they run in two sections.
