= Kominiarski Wierch =

Mountain in Poland

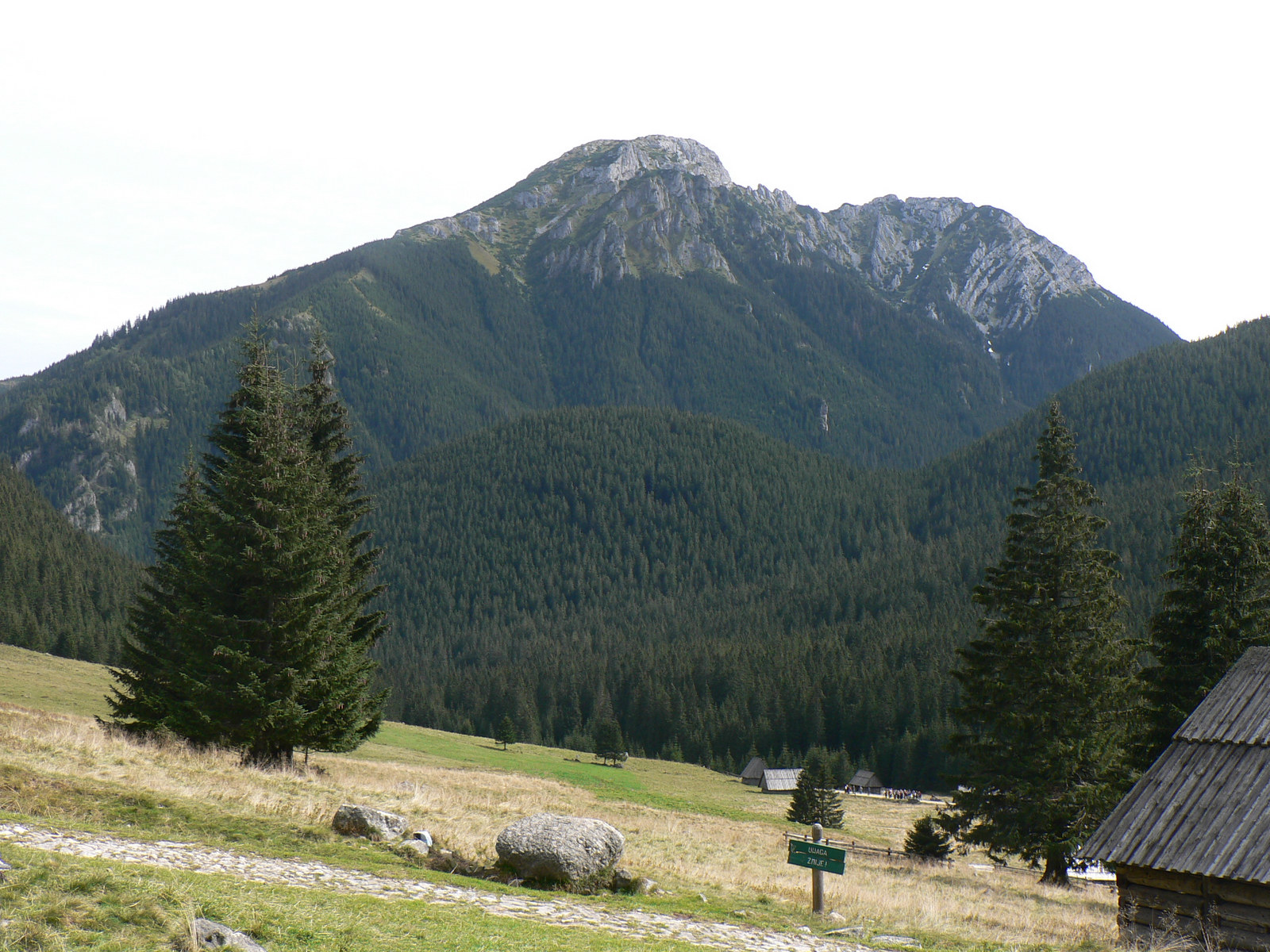
- Kominiarski Wierch

Highest point
- Elevation: 1,829 m (6,001 ft)
- Prominence: 369 m (1,211 ft)
- Coordinates: 49°14′26″N 19°50′07″E

Geography
- Country: Poland
- Voivodship: Lesser Poland
- Parent range: Western Tatras, Tatra Mountains

Kominiarski Wierch is a mountain situated in the Western Tatras mountain range, between the Kościeliska Valley and the Chochołowska Valley. It has an elevation of 1829 meters and a prominence of 369 meters, which is the most prominent peak in the entire Polish Tatras.

The massif is made up of limestone and features numerous caves, including the Bańdzioch Kominiarski, which is one of the longest and deepest caves in the Polish Tatras.

Among the very rare plant species that occur in Poland only in the Tatra Mountains, and even there at only a few localities, the following can be found on Kominiarski Wierch: Omalotheca hoppeana, field fleawort, Helictochloa planiculmis, false medlar, Oxytropis halleri and Antennaria carpatica.

In 1987, the management of the Tatra National Park closed the trail for tourists, citing the need for nature conservation as the reason. Since 2000, the mountain area has remained closed for speleologists and scientists as well.
