= Baníkov =

Mountain in Slovakia

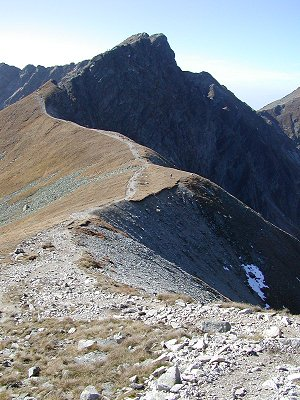
- Summit of Baníkov

Highest point
- Elevation: 2,178 m (7,146 ft)
- Prominence: 261 m (856 ft)
- Coordinates: 49°11′53″N 19°42′39″E

Geography
- Location within Slovakia
- Location: Žilina Region, Slovakia
- Parent range: Western Tatras

Climbing
- Easiest route: Hike

Baníkov (Polish: Banówka) is a mountain in the Western Tatras mountain range, Slovakia. It reaches a height of 2,178 meters.

The name of the mountain refers to iron ore mining activities from the 18th century. There were attempts to find iron ore under the mountain slopes but ended with no success. Baník means 'miner' in Slovak.
