= Giewont =

Mountain in Poland

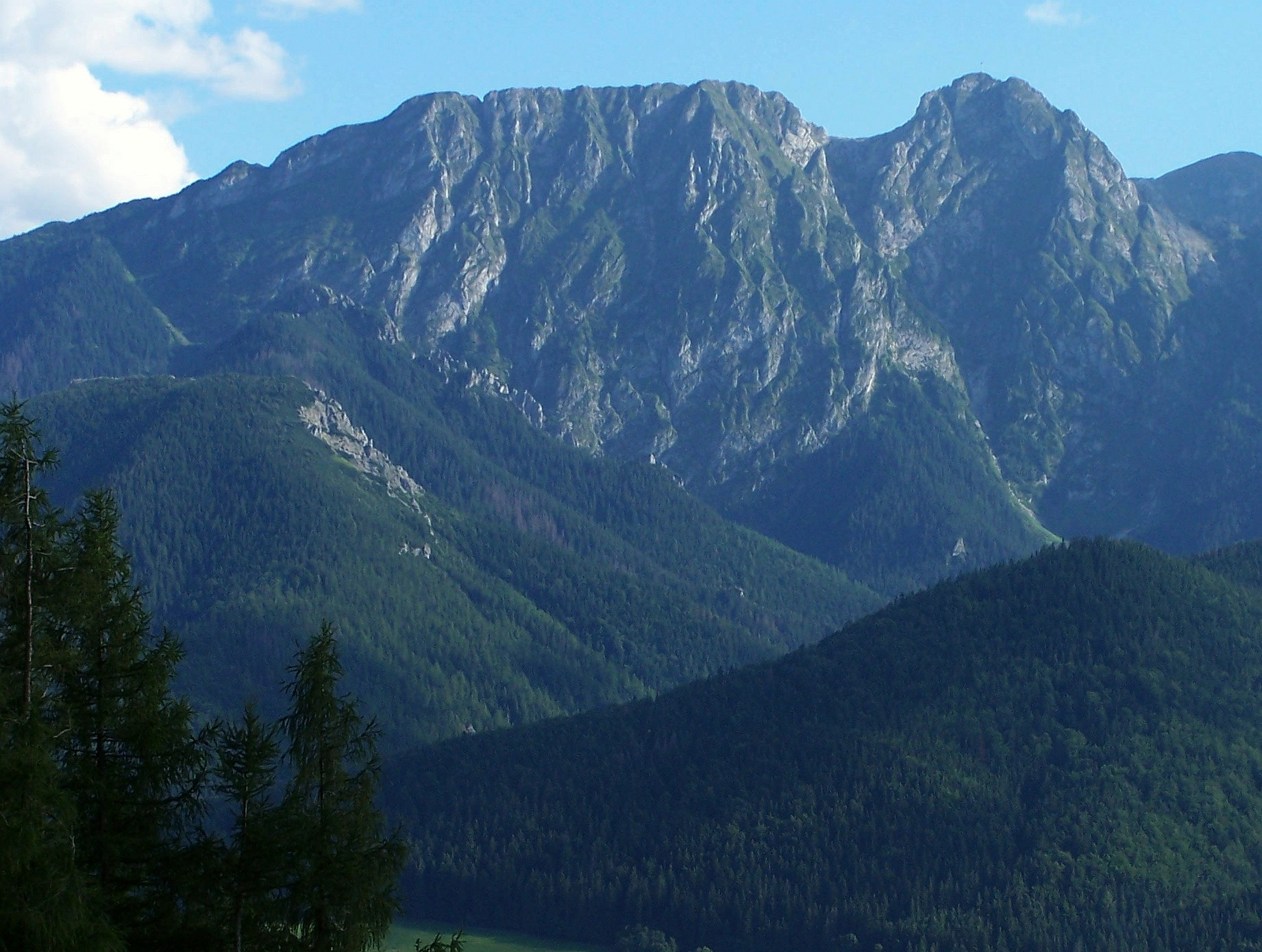

Highest point
- Elevation: 1,894 m (6,214 ft) (Note: According to the most recent measurement by a Polish government body, Giewont has an altitude of 1,894.82 metres (6,216.6 ft), with most sources rounding this down to 1,894 metres (6,214 ft) a.s.l.)
- Prominence: 170 m (560 ft)
- Isolation: 1.31 km (0.81 mi)
- Listing: Mountains of Poland
- Coordinates: 49°15′02″N 19°56′02″E

Geography
- Location within Lesser Poland Voivodeship Location within Poland
- Location: Lesser Poland, Poland
- Parent range: Western Tatras, Tatra Mountains

Climbing
- First ascent: 1830 by Franciszek Herbich and Aleksander Zawadzki
- Easiest route: South

Giewont (Polish pronunciation: [ˈɡʲɛvɔnt]) is a mountain massif in the Tatra Mountains of Poland. Its highest peak, Great Giewont (Wielki Giewont), is 1,894 metres (6,214 ft) above sea level and one of the highest peaks of the Western Tatras (Polish: Tatry Zachodnie) located entirely within Poland's borders. The mountain is regarded as the symbol of Zakopane, the Polish Tatras and Podhale, which throughout history has been the subject of many legends, poems and works of art.

== Geography ==
Giewont lies in the area of the Polish Tatra National Park (Tatrzański Park Narodowy). It encompasses three peaks: Small Giewont (Polish: Mały Giewont, 1,728 metres or 5,669 feet), Great Giewont (Wielki Giewont, 1,894 metres or 6,214 feet) and Long Giewont (Długi Giewont, 1,867 metres or 6,125 feet). There is a mountain pass located between Great and Long Giewont, known as Szczerba (1,823 metres or 5,981 feet). It is located between the valleys of Kondratowa (a branch of the Bystra Valley), Małej Łąki and Strążyska. The 600-metre-high (2,000 ft) northern face of Great Giewont is clearly visible from the nearby town of Zakopane and remains one of the most characteristic features of the panorama of the Polish Tatras. Geologically, Giewont is composed of dolomite and limestone caves, as well as gneiss and granite in the southern section. Giewont's caves include Juhaska Cave, Sleeping Knights' Cave (Polish: Jaskinia Śpiących Rycerzy), Kozia Grota Cave and Ruda Nyża Cave.

== Fauna and flora ==
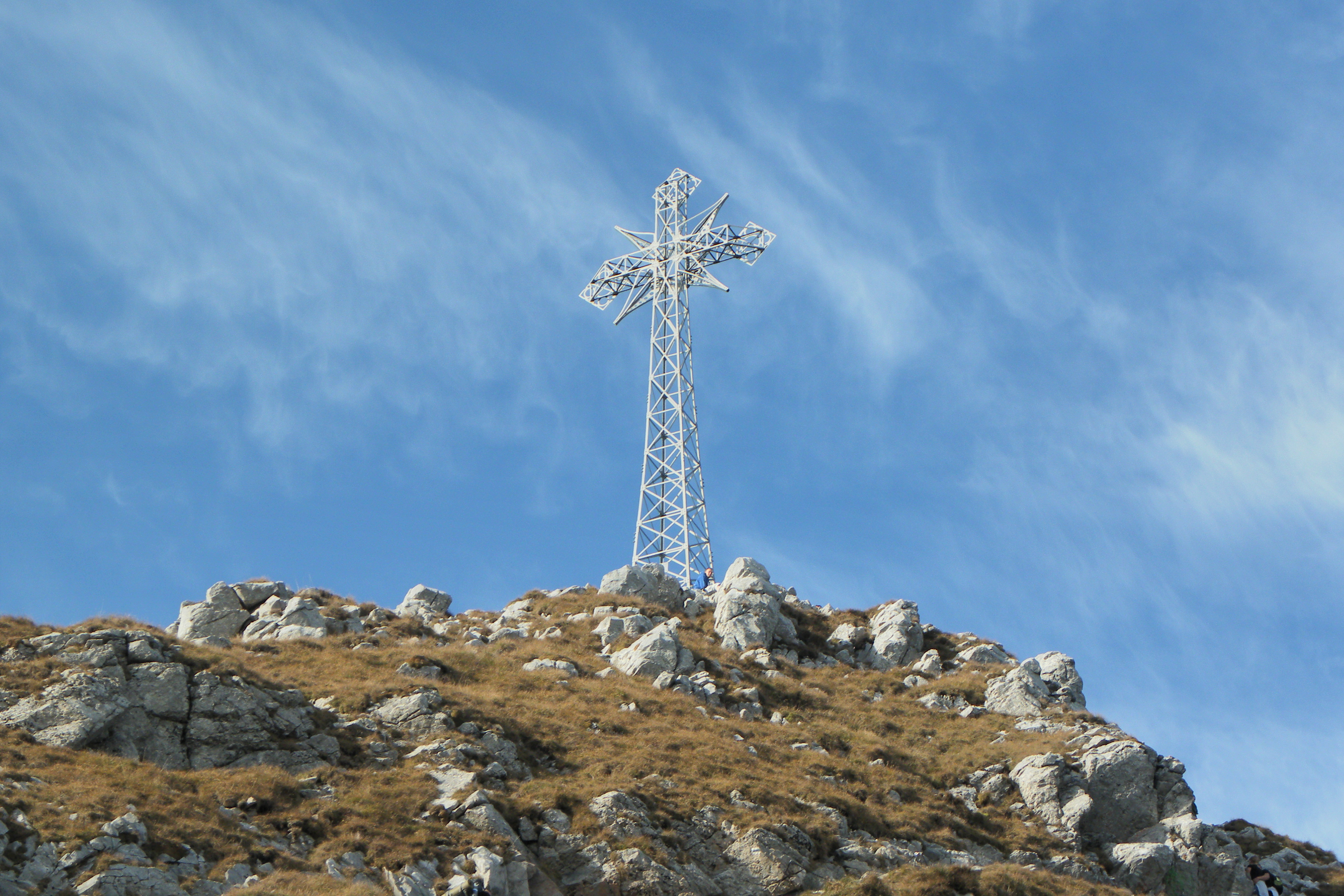
The cross was placed on the summit in 1901

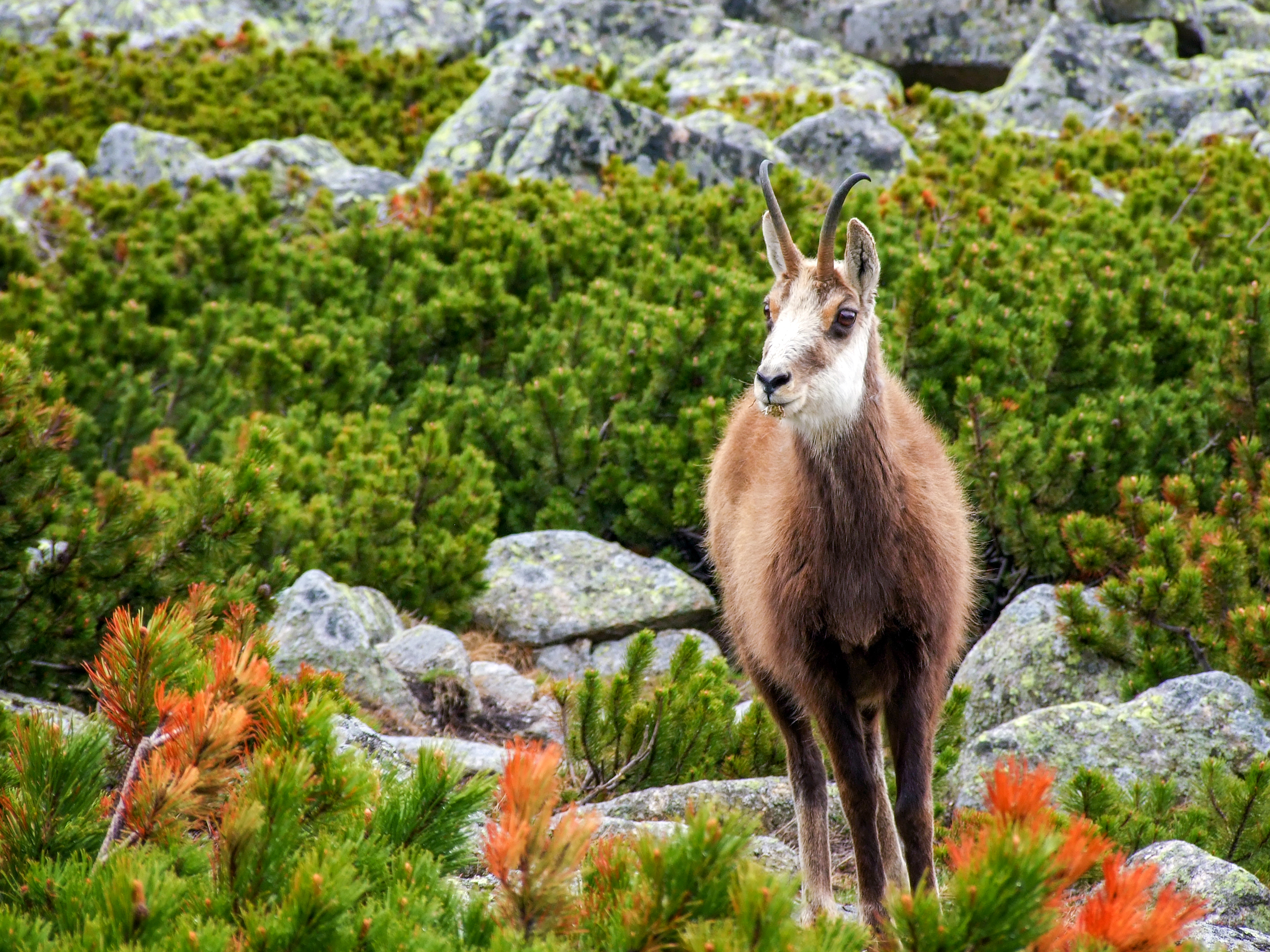
Tatra chamois

A number of Poland's rare species of plants have been recorded in the area including field locoweed, Hoppe's cudweed, halberd willow, leathery grapefern, false orchid, Pedicularis hacqueti, Cerastium latifolium L and Senecio aurantiacus Less. Among notable animal species is Tatra chamois. Giewont is one of few places in Poland where these animals can survive winter.

== History ==
The earliest document mentioning the mountain dates back to the 16th century and mentions a copper mine located in the Gyewant Mountain. The origin of the name remains unclear. It might originate from the German word Gewand (rock formation); however, according to Mariusz Zaruski, the name has its roots like many other names in the Tatras in a family name of Goral people considering the fact that families bearing this name, which, however, could also derive from the German word, still lived in the area.

The first recorded ascent to Giewont's summit was undertaken in 1830 by Franciszek Herbich and Aleksander Zawadzki. Mariusz Zaruski completed the first recorded winter ascent in 1904. Nowadays, hiking trails lead to the peak of the mountain, making it a popular hiking destination.

In 1901, a 15-metre-tall (49 ft) steel cross was erected on the summit of Great Giewont and quickly became a site of religious pilgrimages as well as a national symbol. It also became a place for many to manifest their political views as was the case in 1982 during the Martial law in Poland when a banner with the logo of the Solidarity appeared on the cross. In 2007, the cross was inscribed on the register of historical monuments of the Lesser Poland Voivodeship.

=== 2019 thunderstorm ===
The area frequently experiences thunderstorms. On 22 August 2019, four people were killed and over 100 were injured during an unexpected severe thunderstorm. Most of the victims were on Giewont, where lightning struck the metal cross atop the mountain as well as a metal chain near the summit, according to local media. Four people died in Poland, including two children, and one person died in Slovakia. It was the worst disaster on the mountain since 1937.

== Cultural significance ==
In Polish folklore, the mountain is associated with several legends about sleeping knights who will awake when Poland is in danger. The profile of the mountain resembles a reclining knight, wherein the Long Giewont is the knight's torso, and the Great Giewont is the knight's face as viewed from the side (the three "peaks" representing the chin, the nose, and the eyebrow). The image of Giewont as viewed from the north makes the profile easy to discern. This image of the mountain was further ingrained in the collective consciousness of the nation thanks to an 1880 poem by Adam Asnyk. It proved to be a source of inspiration for many other renowned artists and writers, including Leon Wyczółkowski and Stanisław Ignacy Witkiewicz. In 1875, it officially appeared for the first time on the seal of the city of Zakopane.

In 1880, painter and photographer Walery Eljasz Radzikowski described the mountain in the following words: "Giewont is visible from every cottage, therefore it deservedly holds the title of the King of Zakopane".

== See also ==
- Geography of Poland
- Rysy
- Orla Perć
- Tatra National Park
