= Albínovská hora =

Mountain in Slovakia

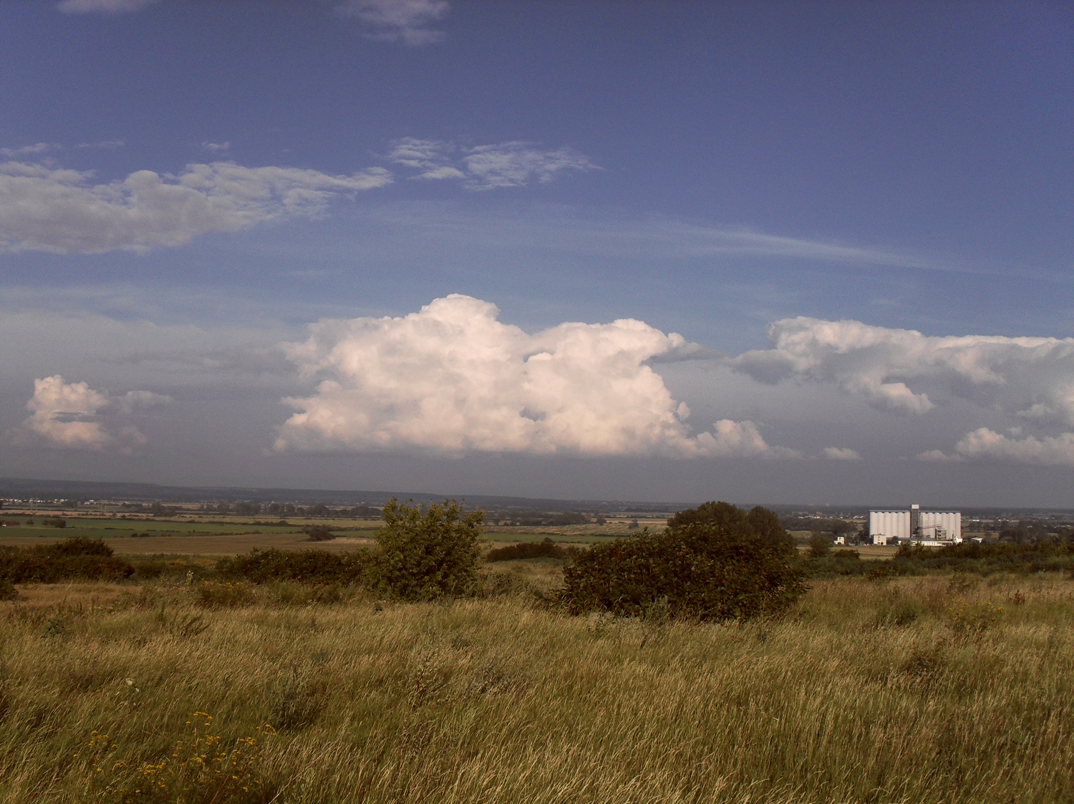
- View from the hill to the east

Highest point
- Elevation: 177 metres (581 ft)
- Coordinates: 48°42′55″N 21°38′56″E

Geography
- Location within Slovakia
- Location: Sečovce, Slovakia
- Parent range: Eastern Slovak Hills

Climbing
- Easiest route: YDS Class 1 (path)

Albínovská hora, sometimes also Albínovská hôrka (translated to English as Albinov Hill or Albinov Mountain, in local dialect Baňa—Mine from Hungarian Bánya) is a hill located on the west part of Sub-Slanec Hills, division of Eastern Slovak Hills, in eastern Slovakia. The hill is high 177 metres (581 ft) and it is located in the administrative area of Sečovce, 1.7 kilometres (1 mi) north of the residential area.

Remains of Tertiary volcanic activity in the area (see Slanské Hills) is andesite and characteristic tuff, covered under layers by Neogene sedimentary rocks – gravel, sand, kaolin etc.
