= Klin (mountain) =

Peak in the Western Tatras between Slovakia and Poland

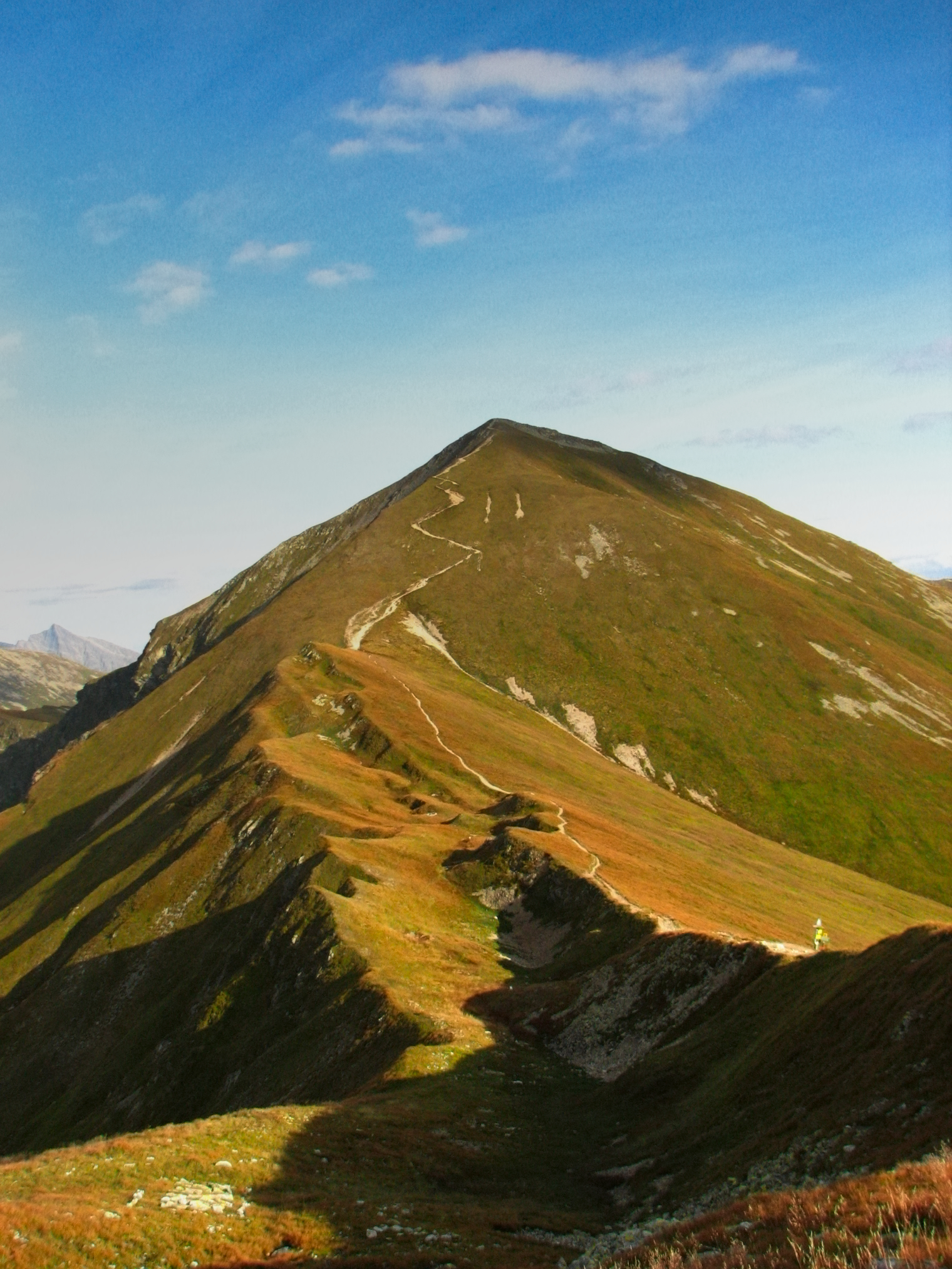
- Klin seen from the northwest

Highest point
- Elevation: 2,176 m (7,139 ft)
- Prominence: 221 m (725 ft)
- Listing: Mountains of Poland
- Coordinates: 49°11′56″N 19°49′11″E

Geography
- Location within Poland Location within Slovakia
- Countries: Poland and Slovakia
- Parent range: Western Tatras

Klin (sk. Klin, pl. Starorobociański Wierch) is a peak in the Western Tatras, on the border between Slovakia and Poland. Its summit is at 2,176 metres (7,139 ft) AMSL. It is the highest peak in Polish Western Tatras. The foreground is a classic split ridge or doppelgrat, spreading under tension due to deep erosion in the valleys either side. The finest example in the Tatra is between Kamienista and Smreczynski Wierch nearby.
