= Bystrá (mountain) =

Mountain in Slovakia

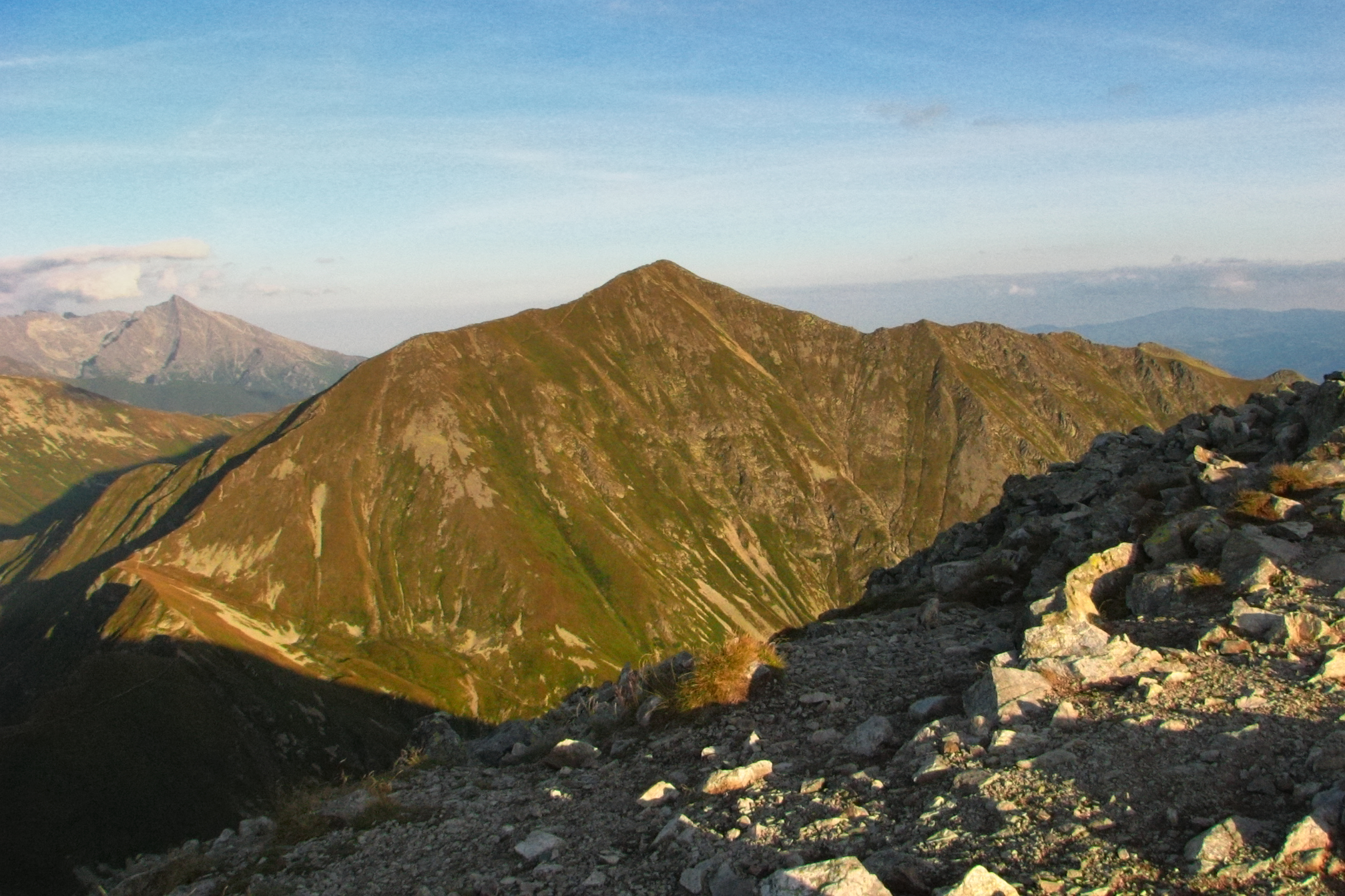
- Bystrá as seen from Klin

Highest point
- Elevation: 2,248 m (7,375 ft)
- Isolation: 11.55 km (7.18 mi) to Kriváň
- Coordinates: 49°11′19″N 19°50′34″E

Geography
- Location within Slovakia
- Location: Žilina Region, Slovakia
- Parent range: Western Tatras

Climbing
- Easiest route: Hike

Bystrá is the highest mountain in the Western Tatras in Slovakia, near the Polish border. It is 2,248 meters high and surrounded by the valleys of Kamenistá, Račkova and Bystrá.

== See also ==
- Tatra Mountains
