= Western Tatras =

Mountain range in Europe

- Slovak: Západné Tatry; Polish: Tatry Zachodnie
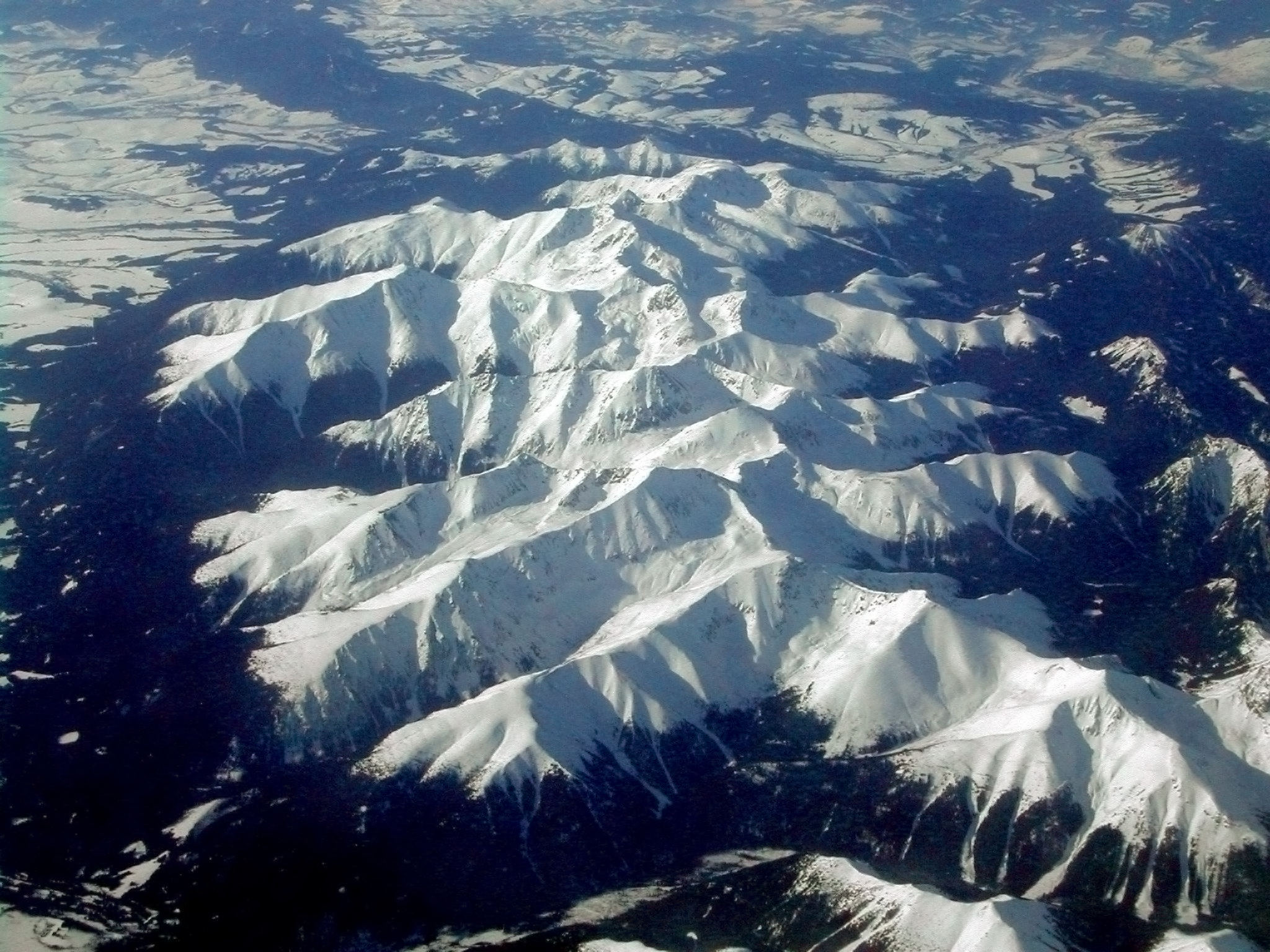
- Western Tatras in winter

Highest point
- Peak: Bystrá
- Elevation: 2,248.4 m (7,377 ft)

Geography
- Location within Central Europe
- Countries: Slovakia; Poland
- Region: Žilina; Lesser Poland
- Range coordinates: 49°12′N 19°45′E
- Parent range: Tatra Mountains
- Borders on: Eastern Tatras

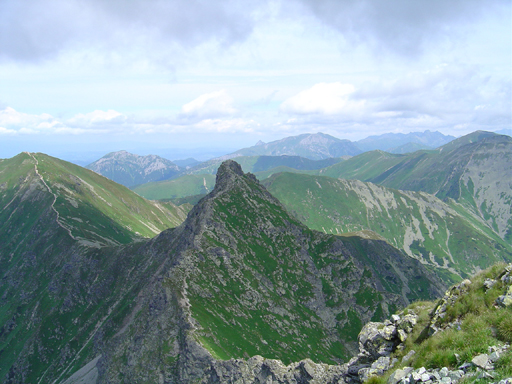
Ostrý Roháč

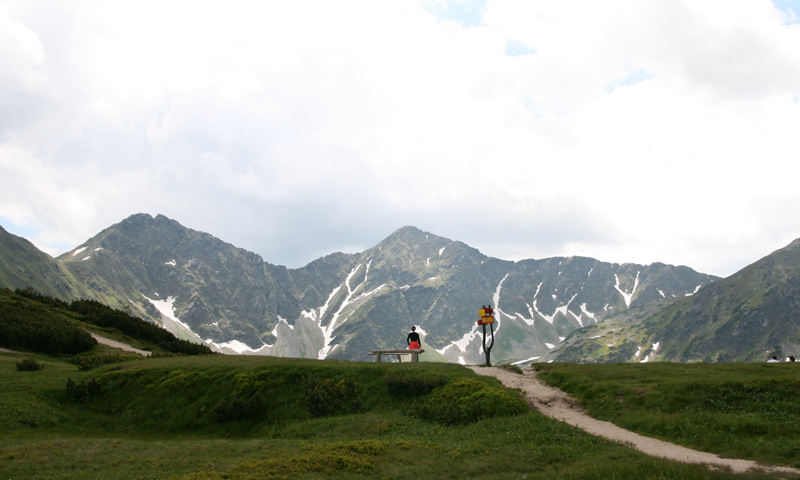
Ostrý Roháč and Plačlivé

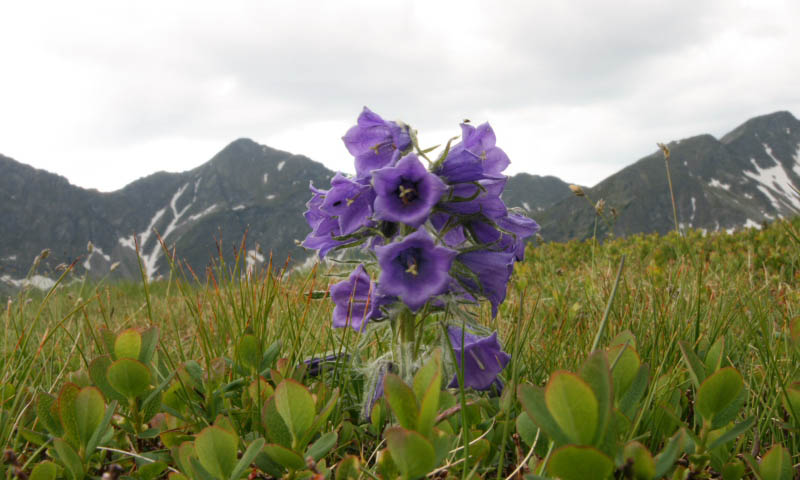
Plačlivé

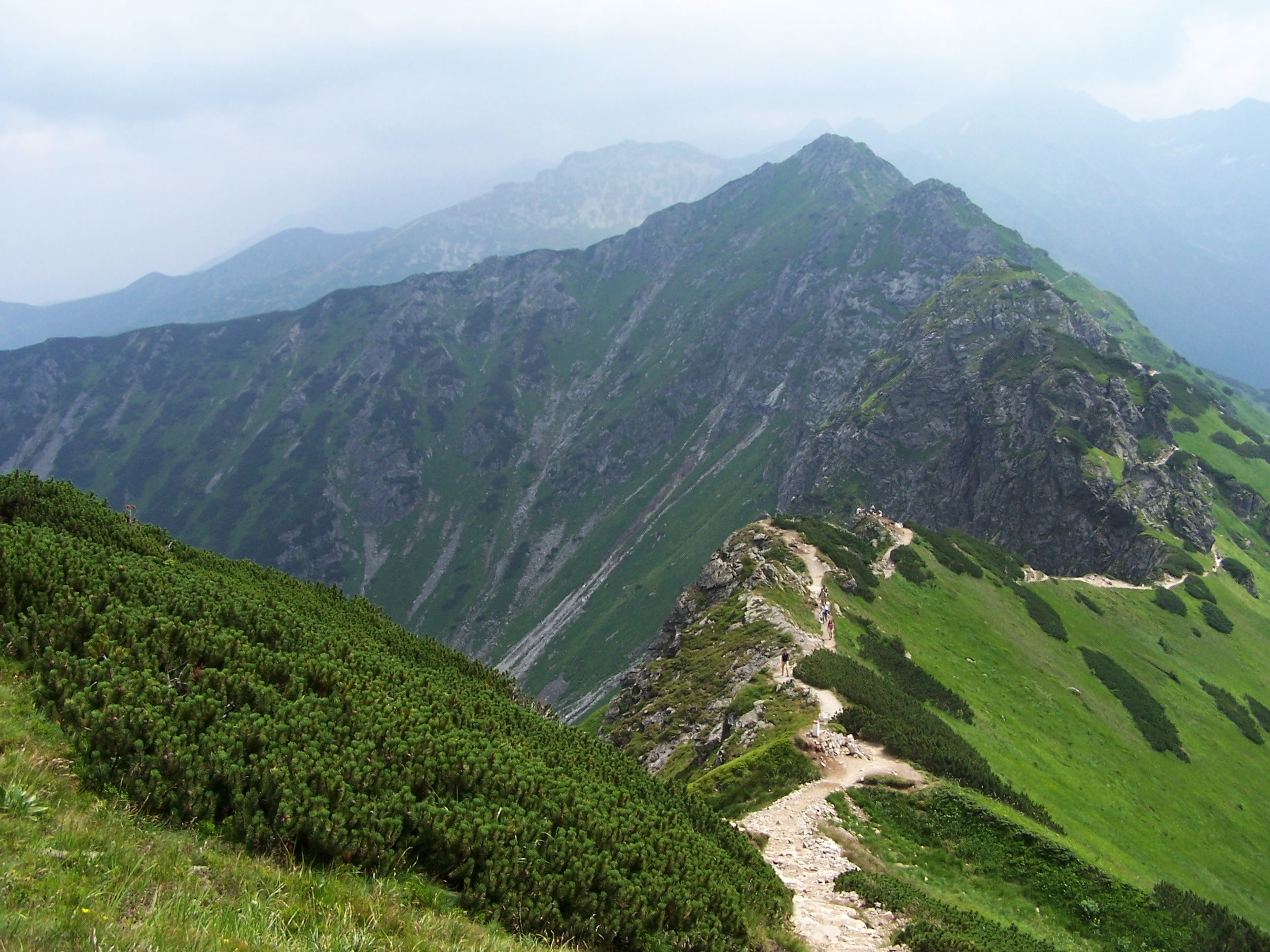
Goryczkowa Czuba

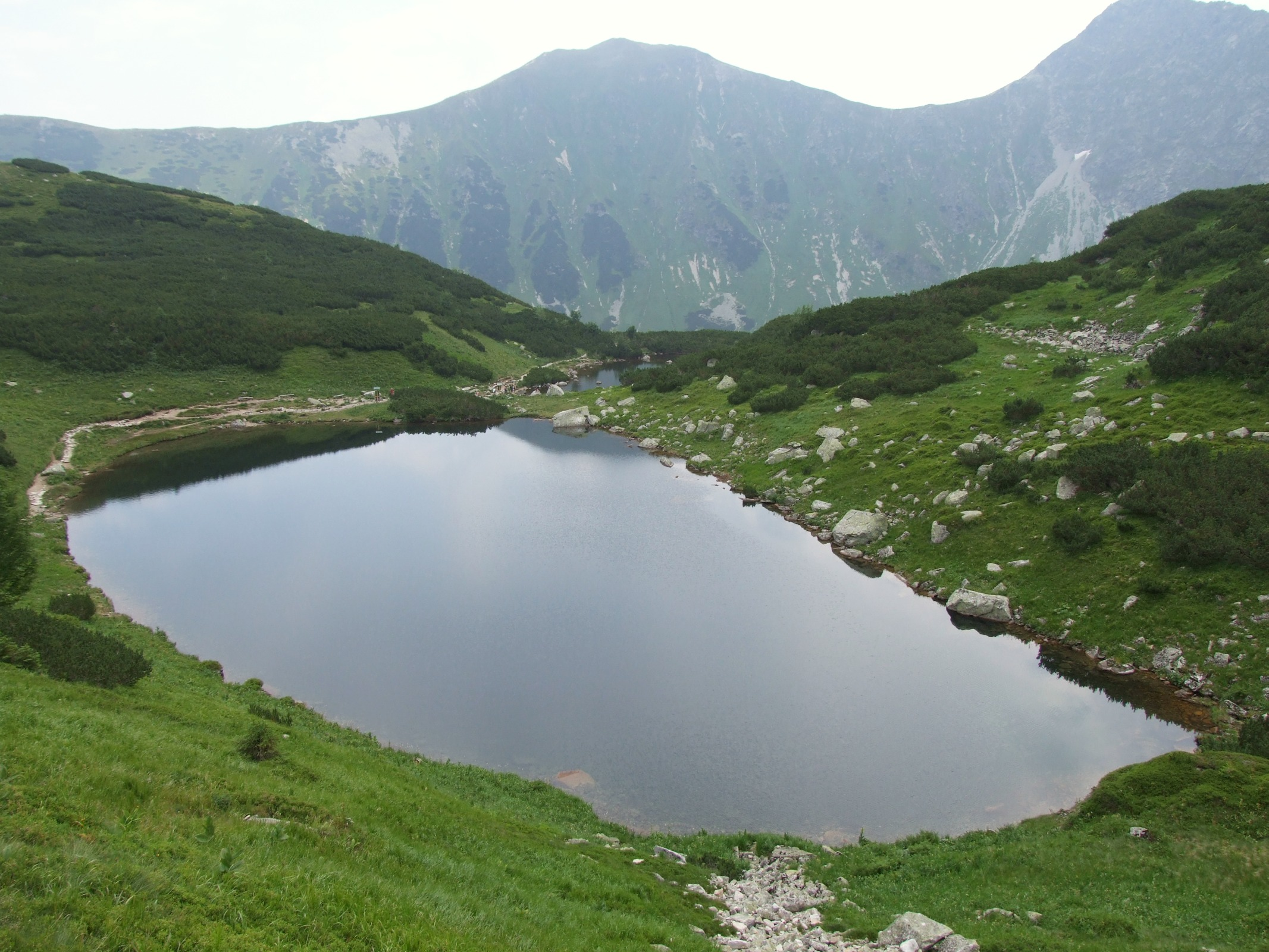
Druhé Roháčske pleso

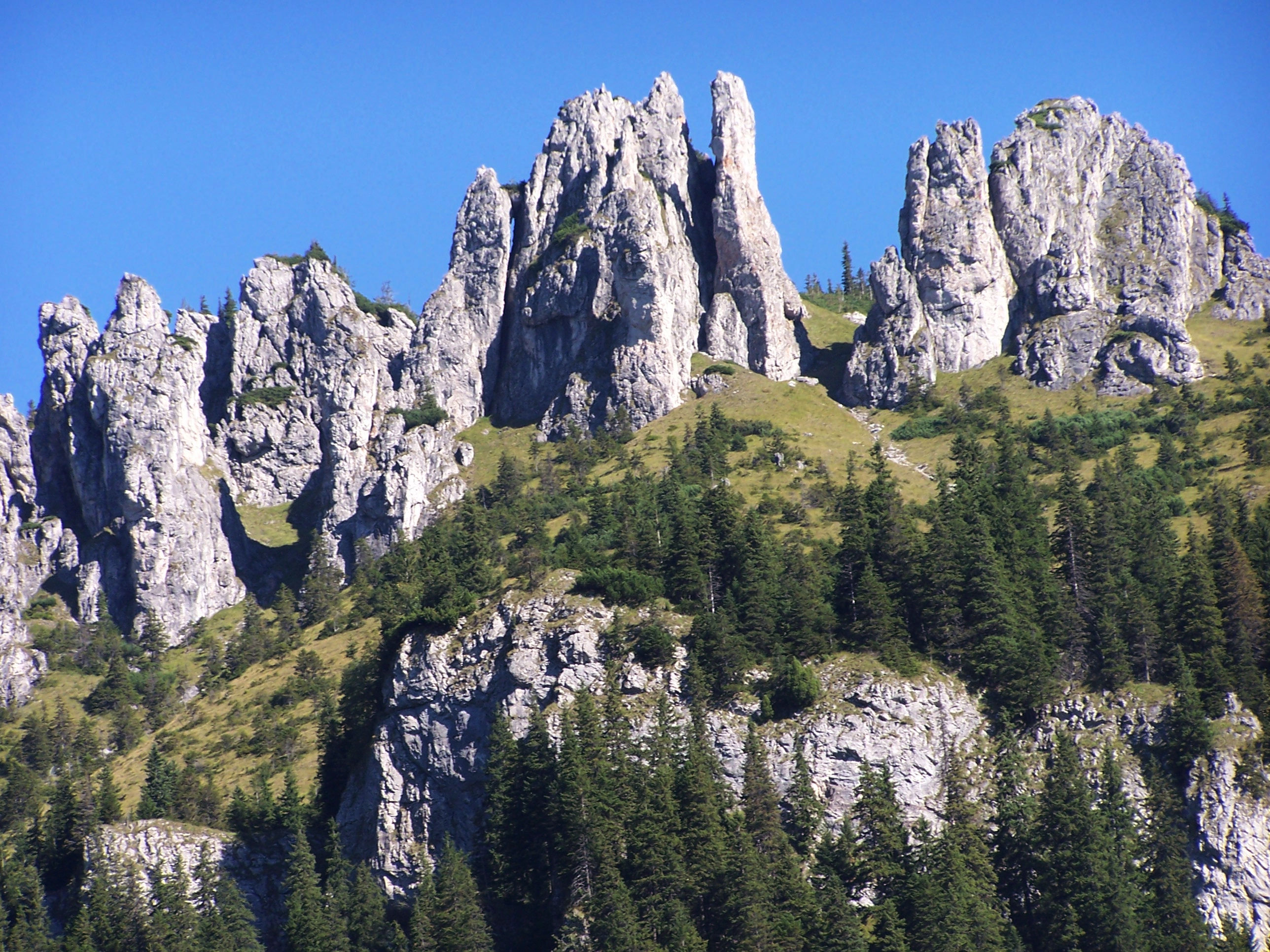
Chochołowska valley, Mnichy Chochołowskie

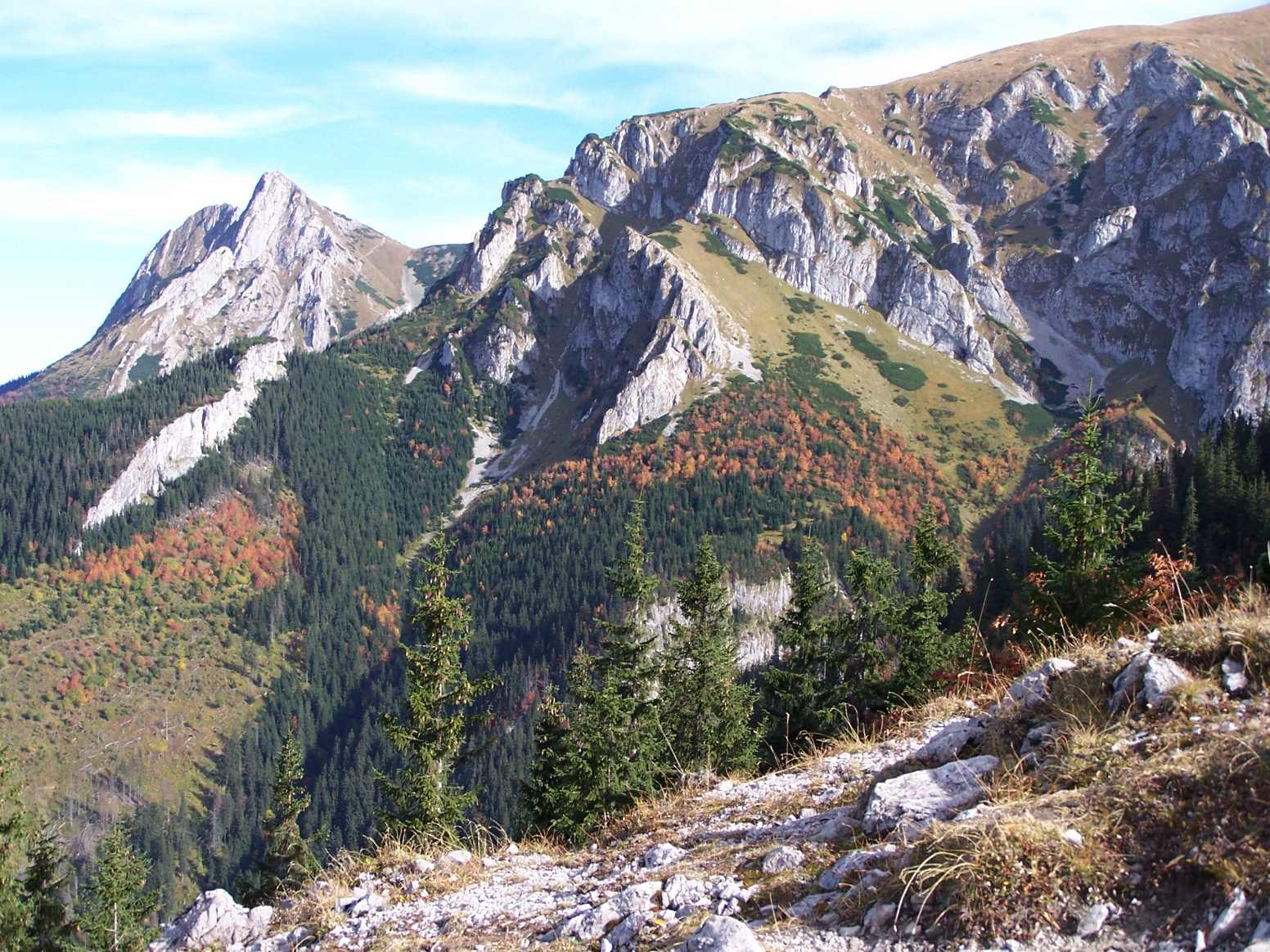
Giewont and Czerwony Grzbiet

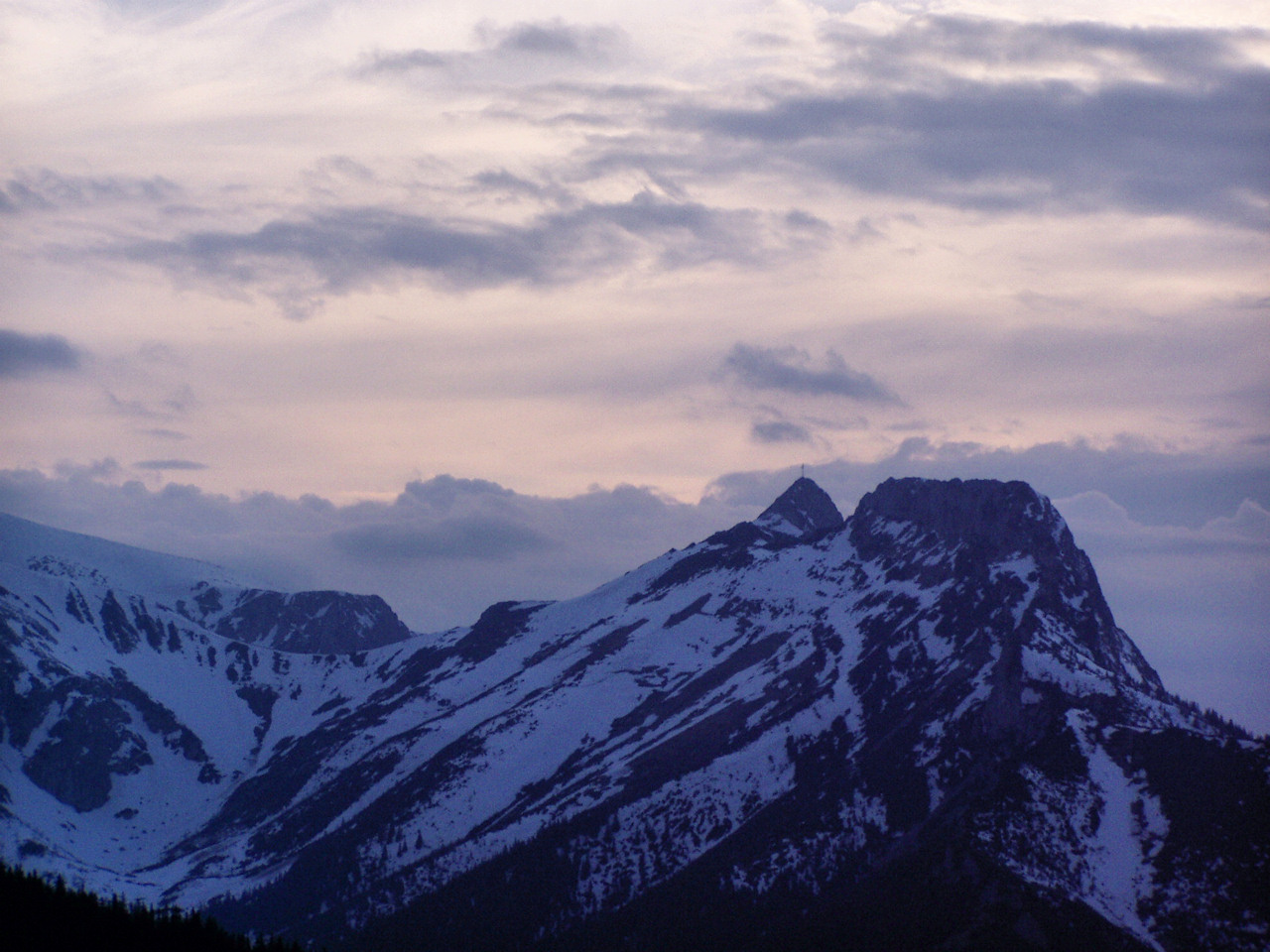
Giewont from the East

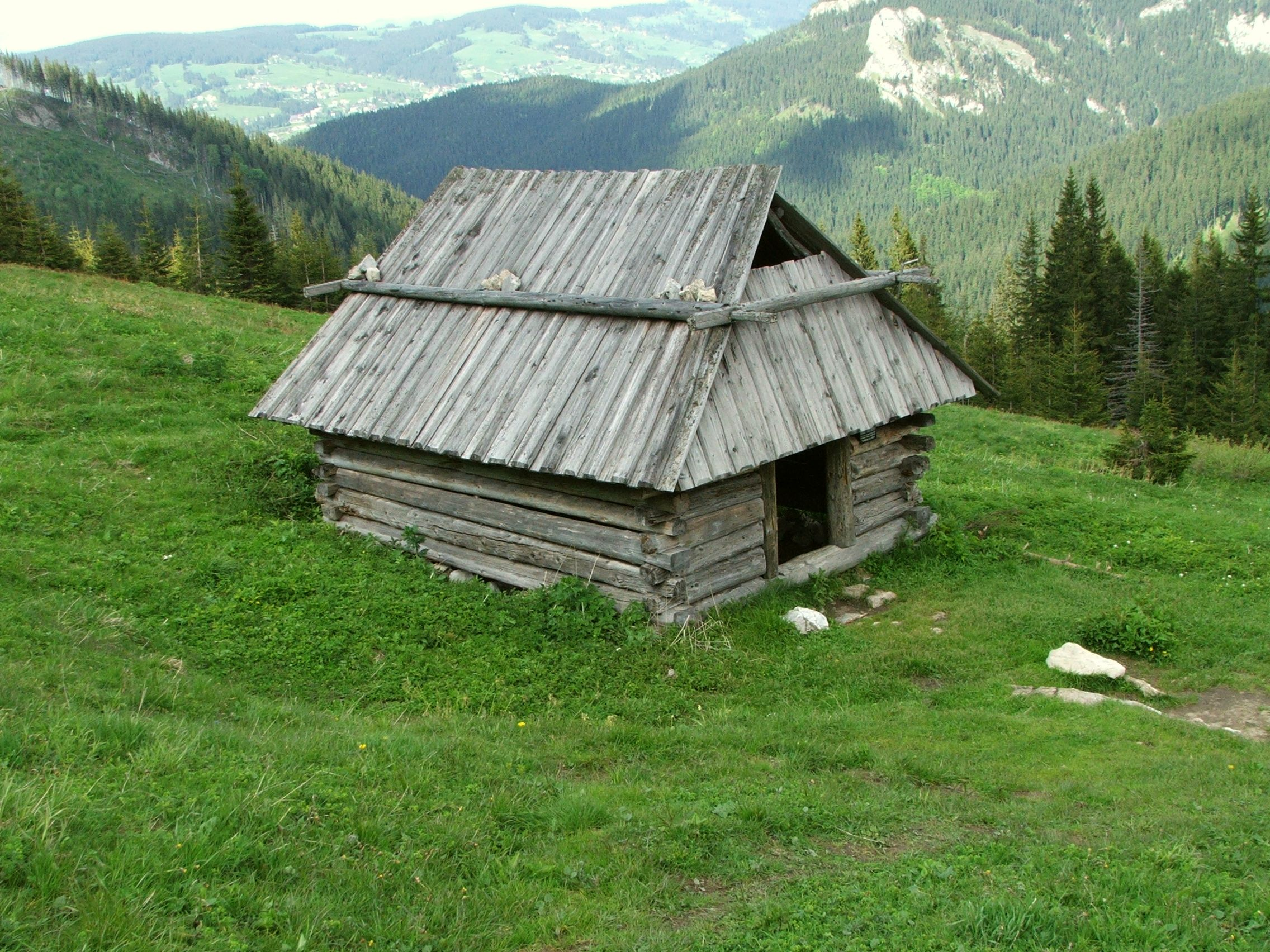
Polana Stoły

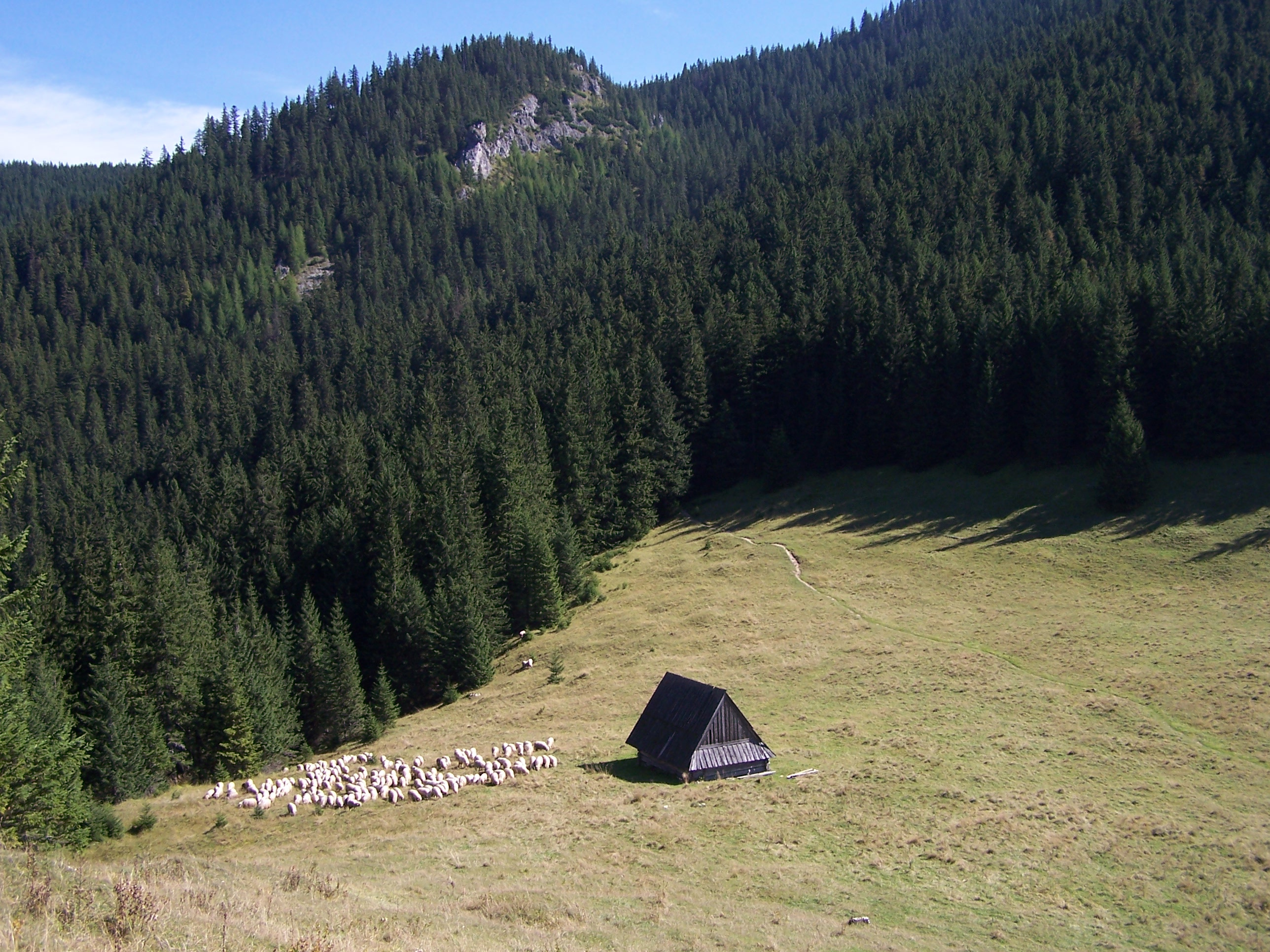
Polana Jamy

The Western Tatras (Slovak: Západné Tatry; Polish: Tatry Zachodnie) are mountains in the Tatras, part of the Carpathian Mountains, located on the Polish-Slovak border. The mountains border the High Tatras in the east, Podtatranská kotlina in the south, Choč Mountains in the west and Rów Podtatrzański in the north. The main ridge is 37 kilometers long and the mountain range contains 31 two-thousanders.

Western Tatras are the second highest mountain range both in Poland and Slovakia; its highest peak is Bystrá at 2,248 meters. Other notable mountains include Jakubiná (2,194 m), Baranec (2,184 m), Baníkov (2,178 m), Tri kopy (2,136.3 m), Plačlivé (2,125.1 m), Ostrý Roháč (2,087.5 m), Volovec (Polish: Wołowiec; 2,064 m), Kasprowy Wierch (Slovak: Kasprov vrch; 1,987 m) and Giewont (1,894 m). They are partially located in the traditional regions of Liptov, Orava and Podhale. The highest point in Poland is Starorobociański Wierch (2,176 m).

== Division ==
The Western Tatras are subdivided into 6 regions on the Slovak side and 4 on the Polish side.

Slovak Western Tatras:

- Osobitá (highest point: Osobitá, 1 687 m)
- Sivý vrch (highest point: Sivý vrch, 1 805 m)
- Liptovské Tatry (highest point: Bystrá, 2 248 m)
- Roháče (highest point: Baníkov, 2 178 m)
- Červené vrchy (highest point: Kresanica / Krzesanica, 2 122 m)
- Liptovské kopy (highest point: Veľká kopa, 2 052 m)

Polish Western Tatras:

- Grześ
- Kasprowy Wierch
- Czerwone Wierchy (corresponds to Červené vrchy, highest point: Kresanica / Krzesanica, 2 122 m)
- Ornak

== Geology and ecology ==
The Western Tatras are protected by Tatranský národný park in Slovakia and Tatrzański Park Narodowy in Poland.

=== Peaks ===
The following is a list of the highest 10 of the 31 two-thousanders in Western Tatras:

Image	Slovak name	Polish name	Height	Location & Notes
	Bystrá	Bystra	2,248.4 m 7,377 ft	Liptovské Tatry, the highest peak in Slovak Western Tatras
	Jakubiná	Raczkowa Czuba	2,193.7 m 7,197 ft	
	Baranec	Baraniec	2,184.6 m 7,167 ft	
	Baníkov	Banówka	2,178 m 7,146 ft	Highest point on the main ridge
	Klin	Starorobociański Wierch	2,176 m 7,139 ft	Main ridge, the highest peak in Polish Western Tatras
	Pachoľa	Pachola	2,167 m 7,110 ft	Main ridge
	Hrubá kopa	Hruba Kopa	2,166 m 7,106 ft	Main ridge
	Blyšť	Błyszcz	2,159 m 7,083 ft	Bystrá ridge
	Príslop	Jałowiecki Przysłop	2,142 m 7,028 ft	
	Hrubý vrch	Jarząbczy Wierch	2,137 m 7,011 ft	

=== Saddles (cols) ===
- Pálenica (1 570 m)
- Parichvost (1 870 m)
- Baníkovské sedlo (2 045 m)
- Smutné sedlo (1 965 m)
- Žiarske sedlo (1 917,1 m)
- Jamnícke sedlo (1 908 m)
- Račkovo sedlo (1 958 m)
- Gáborovo sedlo (1 890 m)
- Bystré sedlo (1 960 m)
- Pyšné sedlo (1 791,6 m)
- Tomanovské sedlo (1 685,9 m)
- Ľaliové sedlo (1 951,8 m)

=== Tarns ===
There are approximately 20 to 32 tarns (Slovak: pleso) in Western Tatras. The exact number is difficult to obtain because of lack of an exact definition and because it is sometimes hard to prove what is a tarn and what is not. The following is a list of 15 largest tarns in Western Tatras:

Image	Slovak name	Polish name	Height (m)	Area (ha)	Depth (m)
	Dolné Roháčske pleso	Niżni Staw Rohacki	1563	2.22	6.3
	Horné Roháčske pleso	Wyżni Staw Rohacki	1718	1.45	8.1
	Dolné Jamnícke pleso	Niżni Jamnicki Staw	1728	1.13	4.0
	Horné Bystré pleso	Wielki Staw Bystry	1875	0.86	12.5
	Horné Račkovo pleso	Zadni Staw Raczkowy	1717	0.74	10.0
	Tretie Roháčske pleso	Pośredni Rohacki Staw	1653	0.61	3.7
	Horné Jamnícke pleso	Wyżni Jamnicki Staw	1834	0.41	8.0
	Spodné Bystré pleso	Niżni Staw Bystry	1837	0.34	4.0
	Pleso pod Zverovkou	Stawek pod Zwierówką	983	0.31	1.2
	Ťatliakovo pleso	Czarna Młaka	1370	0.28	1.2
	Druhé Roháčske pleso	Mały Rohacki Staw	1650	0.28	1.3
	Horné Tomanovo pleso	Wyżni Tomanowy Stawek	1592	0.19	1.0
	Žiarske pleso	Żarski Stawek	1860	0.11	0.8
	Kobylie pleso	Kobyli Stawek	1742	0.10	1.5
	Biele Bobrovecké pleso	Biały Stawek Bobrowiecki	1502	0.10	1.5

=== Caves ===
- Jaskinia Wielka Śnieżna, the largest and deepest cave in Poland.
- Brestovská cave, uniquely features an underground river
- Piwniczka

=== Waterfalls ===
- Siklawica Falls, the second highest waterfall in the Polish Tatras

== Tourism ==
In Slovakia, there are four tourist centers inside the Western Tatras area: Zverovka, Brestová and Ťatliakova chata in the northern region and Žiarska chata in the southern region. All other tourist centers lie at the outside borders of the mountains, including: Oravice, Zuberec, Bobrovecká vápenica, Žiar, Konská, Jakubovany-Studená dolina, Pribylina, Podbanské.

In Poland, the list of settlements located at the foothills of Western Tatras includes the villages of Dzianisz, Kościelisko, Witów and the town of Zakopane.

== See also ==
- Eastern Tatras – mountain range bordering the Western Tatras in the east
- Mountain Rescue Service (Slovakia)
- Tatra Volunteer Search and Rescue
- Tatra National Park, Slovakia
- Tatra National Park, Poland
- Tourism in Slovakia
- Tourism in Poland
