= Yabluniv =

Rural settlement in Ivano-Frankivsk Oblast, Ukraine

Yabluniv Яблунів Jabłonów
- Rural settlement
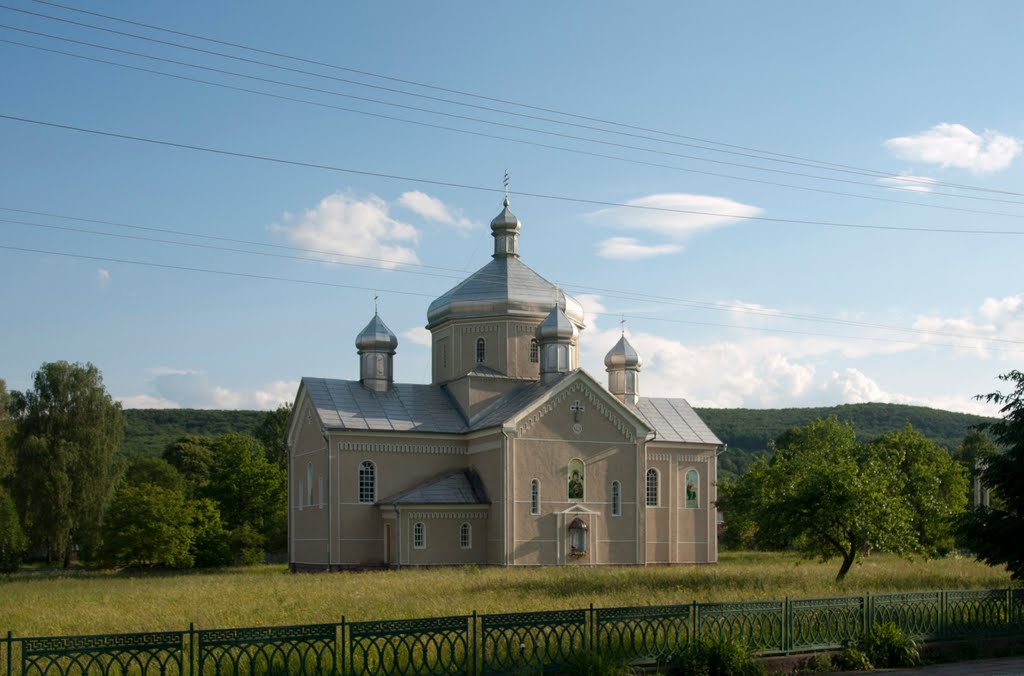
- Ukrainian Greek-Catholic church

- Location of Yabluniv in Ivano-Frankivsk Oblast Location of Yabluniv in Ukraine
- Coordinates: 48°24′19″N 24°56′30″E
- Country: Ukraine
- Oblast: Ivano-Frankivsk Oblast
- Raion: Kosiv Raion

Area
  - Total: 105 km^{2} (41 sq mi)

Population (2022)
  - Total: 2,044

Yabluniv (Ukrainian: Яблунів; Polish: Jabłonów; Yiddish: יאבלאנאָוו, romanized: Yablanov; Russian: Яблонoв) is a rural settlement in Kosiv Raion, Ivano-Frankivsk Oblast, Ukraine. It is located on the banks of the river Luchka, 15 kilometres (9.3 mi) from Kolomyia. Yabluniv hosts the administration of Yabluniv settlement hromada, one of the hromadas of Ukraine. Population: 2,044 (2022 estimate).

== History ==
The town had an historically important Jewish population but they were murdered during the Holocaust in Ukraine.

Until 26 January 2024, Yabluniv was designated urban-type settlement. On this day, a new law entered into force which abolished this status, and Yabluniv became a rural settlement.

== Notable people ==
- Stanisław Jan Jabłonowski (1634–1702) was a Polish nobleman, magnate, outstanding military commander.
- Maksymilian Nowicki (1826–1890) was a Polish zoology professor and pioneer conservationist in Galicia and father of the poet Franciszek Nowicki.
- Nestor Kysilevskyi (1909–2000), Ukrainian sculptor
- Mykola Matiyiv-Melnyk (1890–1947) was a Ukrainian writer and journalist.
- Anne Werzberg, mother of French mime artist and actor Marcel Marceau (born Marcel Mangel)

== Museums ==
- Museum "Wooden Sculpture"

== Places of interest ==
- Yablonov Jewish Cemetery
