= Eutely =

Organisms with a fixed number of somatic cells when they reach maturity

Eutelic organisms have a fixed number of somatic cells when they reach maturity, the exact number being relatively constant for any one species. This phenomenon is also referred to as cell constancy. Development proceeds by cell division until maturity; further growth occurs via cell enlargement only. This growth is known as auxetic growth. It is shown by members of the now obsolete phylum Aschelminthes. In some cases, individual organs show eutelic properties while the organism itself does not.

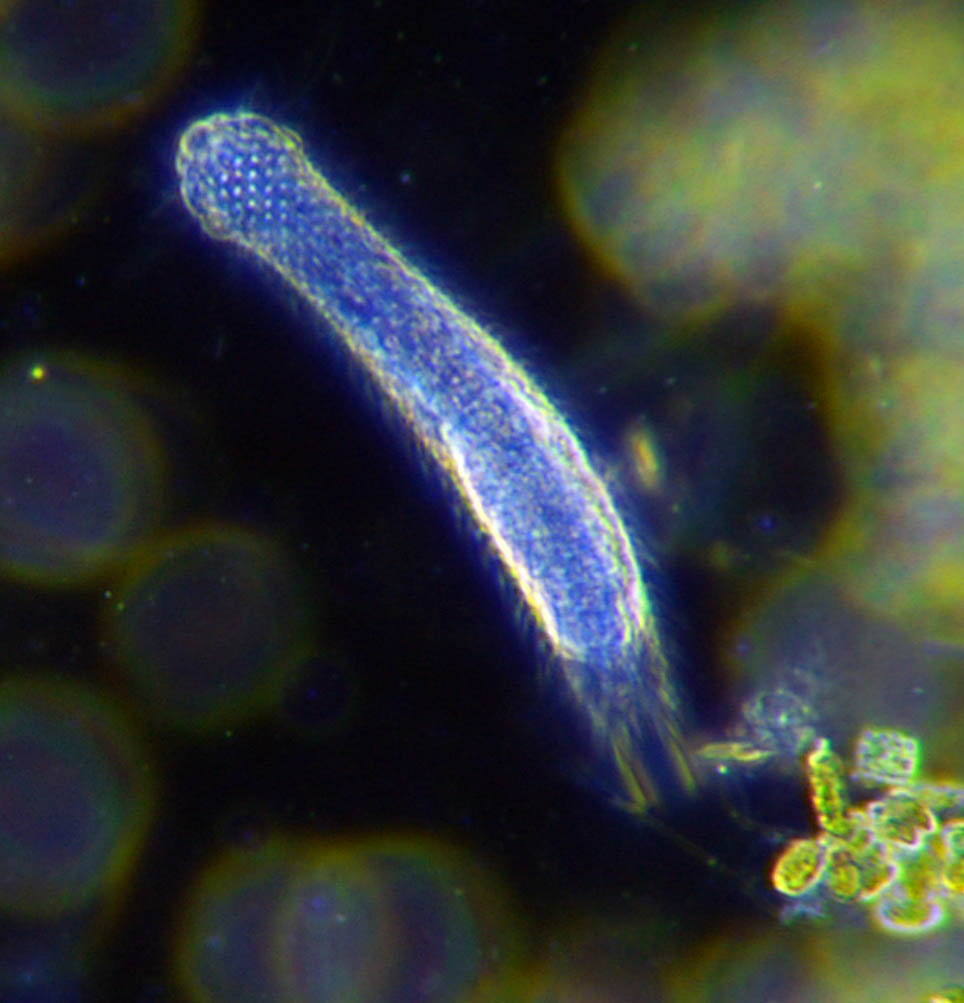
A mature gastrotrich, with visible cells on the surface. Further growth will now occur solely by cell enlargement.

== Background ==
In 1909, Eric Martini coined the term eutely to describe the idea of cell constancy and to introduce a term literature sources would be able to use to identify organisms with a fixed amount and arrangement of cells and tissues. Since the introduction of eutely in the early 1900s, textbooks and theories of cytology and ontogeny have not used the term consistently. Advancements in the field of eutely has been developed by morphologists.

Studying of eutelic organisms has proved challenging, as most eutelic organisms are microscopic. Additionally, there is potential for mistakes in cell counting (often completed via an automated cell counter) and observation when larger organisms have numerous cells. In organisms of small size, errors in the examination and explanation of units may entirely negate reconstructions and deductions. Therefore, investigation of most eutelic organisms is done with intense scrutiny and review.

There are two distinct classes of organisms which display eutely:

1. Eutelic organisms whose somatic cells show a fixed, or complete pattern of cell and tissue number and arrangement
2. Eutelic organisms whose somatic cells show a limited, or incomplete pattern of cell and tissue number and arrangement

== Examples ==
Eutely has been confirmed to certain degrees in various forms of diversity and sections of the tree of life. Examples include rotifers, many species of nematodes (including ascaris and the organism Caenorhabditis elegans whose male individuals have 1,033 cells), tardigrades, larvaceans and dicyemida. Additionally, examples of cell constancy have been seen among arthropods, specifically within sensory and nervous organs. Circumstances of partial cell consistency has been discovered in various insects and larvae. Annelids have been observed to provide evidence demonstrating constancy in the amount and arrangement of cells in larva of various species and in certain nervous cells of leeches. The phyla Rotifera and Gastrotricha are thought to show absolute cell constancy.

Preliminary studies of nematodes led scientists to believe only single organs of nematodes showed eutely. However, later evidence proved complete cell constancy for the tissues of multiple nematode forms. Within the Acanthocephalan phylum, various degrees of constancy have been studied but cell number and arrangement constancy has been seen in at least one family. Within the Platyhelminthes, subphylum Turbellaria display evidence of constancy. Organisms within class Trematoda display constant gland cell number as do epithelial cells in a few Miracidia.

=== Phylogeny ===
Since eutelic organisms have displayed such wide variety and diversity in lineage and ancestry, there is yet to be an attempt to establish a phylogenetic relationship. Previous researchers have made efforts to determine the relationship between trematodes and rotifers as their complete constancy qualities suggest a close relatedness. In the most primitive Protozoa species, close to where animals differentiated from plants, certain microscopic flagellates might provide clues to how cell constancy in animals developed. These organisms have the ability to establish colonies with distinct amounts of cells. This quality is assumed to have been passed on to all subsequent metazoan groups: the development of constant cell numbers. However, this trait is thought to have been lost when new conditions or more influential genes were introduced to the developmental program.

=== Hydatina senta ===
Until 2001, roundworm species Caenorhabditis elegans was considered to be the model organism for complete cell constancy. However, research has unveiled that in the epidermis of these organisms, as the mean cell number increased, as did the variance in cell number within that species. These studies revealed that variability in most taxa assumed to be eutelic is not abnormally low. A relationship between mean cell number and cell number variation was established following a law possessing an exponent of 2 upon a variety of multicellular eutelic taxa.

Hydatina senta (Phylum Rotifera, Order Bdelloidea) is a species of rotifers which demonstrate the most complete cell constancy of any species studied before 1912. Studies have revealed 958 somatic cells in female Hydatina. Hydatina somatic cell nuclei have spatial zones and are easily counted and compared to other counts from that of the same species. The cells from gastric glands and the vitellarium of Hydatina were examined, counted, and statistically analyzed. These cells were chosen because of their prominent nuclei which aided in counting. All gastric glands contained six nuclei with no variation from that value, and of 770 vitellaria studied, 767 showed eight nuclei, with two showing ten nuclei and one showing twelve. However, it was concluded that these variants were in a phase of senescence before they returned to their original complete cell count.

== Incomplete constancy ==
Most examples of eutelic organisms display no certain proof for absolute cell number and arrangement constancy or inconstancy. In many species, the number of cells differs slightly between some organisms.

== Eutelic response to injury ==
In all organisms displaying cell constancy, nuclei division by mitosis in mature cells is not achieved. Embryonic cells are able to undergo mitosis, however, this function is lost when cells become differentiated. There is no evidence showing that this ability is ever regained, even after injury which normally functions to trigger mitosis and cell regeneration. In 1927, a scientist named Jurczik observed that upon removing the arms of the rotifer Stephanoceros, they were unable to regenerate and grow back. Jurczik attributed this to the failure of the cells to mitotically divide. A study of Hydatina senta and Acanthocephala in 1922 by histologist Harley J. Van Cleave at the University of Illinois revealed physiological and morphological corrections of nucleus-cytoplasm intracellular protein interactions. Some of the nuclei studied showed abnormal and elongate shapes. Van Cleave concluded that the change in shape and form of the nuclei is attributed to morphological readjustments of nuclear surface proteins to make up for changes in physiology leading to a phase of senescence. This nuclear surface change has been proposed to be caused by mechanical division or fragmentation of the vitellaria's original cells by microscopic mechanisms yet to be discovered. This state of senescence is presumed to be a readjustment stage on the organism's way back to its absolute constancy state or before cell death.
