= Atrochidae =

Scientific classification
- Domain: Eukaryota
- Kingdom: Animalia
- Phylum: Rotifera
- Class: Monogononta
- Order: Collothecaceae
- Family: Atrochidae

Family of rotifers

Atrochidae is a family of rotifers belonging to the order Collothecaceae.

Genera:

- Acyclus Leidy, 1882
- Atrochus Wierzejski, 1893
- Cupelopagis Forbes, 1882
