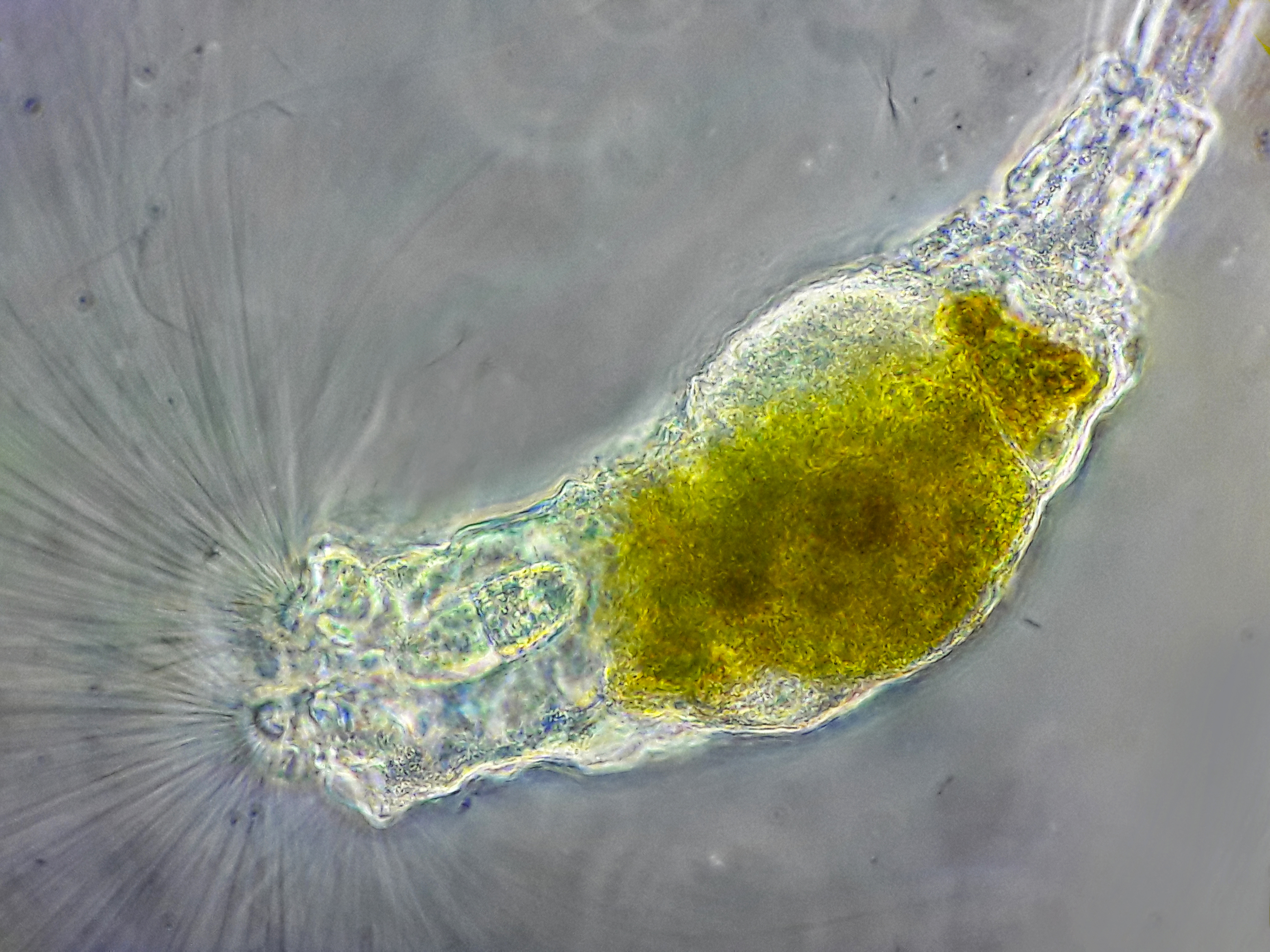

Scientific classification
- Kingdom: Animalia
- Phylum: Rotifera
- Class: Monogononta
- Order: Collothecaceae
- Family: Collothecidae
- Genus: Collotheca; Harring, 1913

Synonyms
- Floscularia Ehrenberg, 1832

= Collotheca =

Genus of rotifers

Collotheca is a genus of rotifers belonging to the family Collothecidae.

The genus was first described by Harring in 1913.

The genus has almost cosmopolitan distribution.

Species:

- Collotheca balatonica
- Collotheca mutabilis
- Collotheca ornata
