= Tadeusz Garbowski =

Polish zoologist

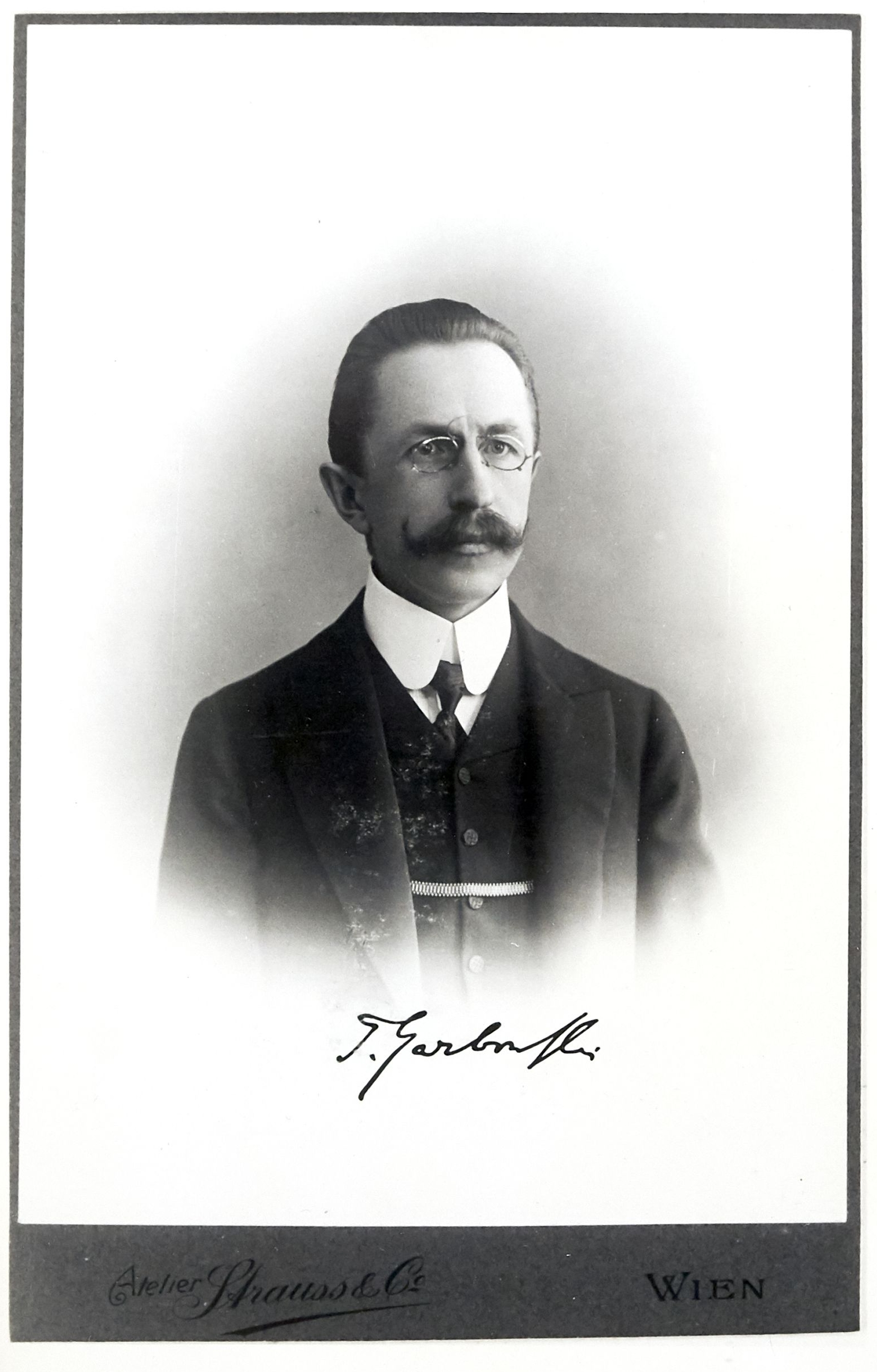

Tadeusz Garbowski (15 June 1869 – 9 January 1940) was a Polish zoologist and philosopher who served as a professor at the Jagiellonian University. He was interested in the philosophy of science and ethology. He also wrote books including poetry under the pseudonym Leon Płoszowski. He was arrested and sent by the Nazi authorities to the Sachsenhausen concentration camp in 1939 and died there shortly after.

== Life and work ==
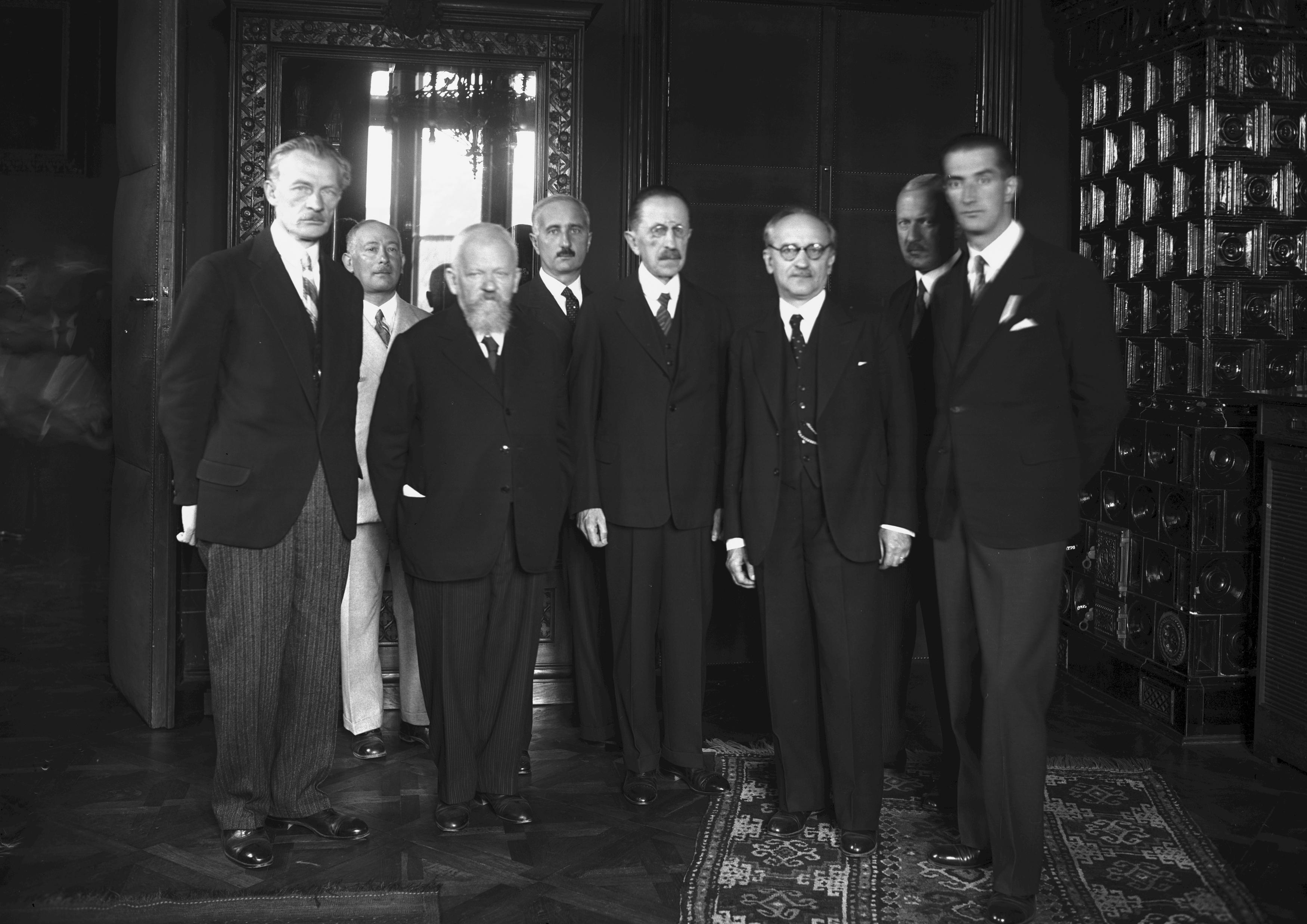
At the 3rd Congress of Philosophers in Kraków in 1936. Standing left to right: Professors Zygmunt Zawirski, Unidentified, Witold Rubczyński, Władysław Tatarkiewicz, Tadeusz Garbowski, Jan Łukasiewicz, Tadeusz Czeżowski, and Marian Heitzman.

Garbowski was born in Złoczów to district prosecutor Julian and Klementyna née Gryziecka. His father was a descendant of Zawisza Czarny from Garbów. After going to high school in Złoczów he went to University of Lviv where he was influenced by Benedykt Dybowski and Henryk Wielowieyski. He then studied zoology at Vienna University. In 1893 he wrote on the lepidoptera of Galicia and received a doctor of philosophy. In 1897 he habilitated with a dissertation on amphipods, working under Karl Grobben and Berthold Hatschek. He became an assistant in Krakow to professor Antoni Wierzejski. In 1903 he became an associate professor of zoology and in 1911 he headed the department of natural philosophy. In 1922 he helped establish the psychogenetic institute which he headed till 1926. His health deteriorated and he went on sick leave and retired in August 1935. On 6 November 1939 he attended a meeting organized by the Nazi authorities and was arrested as part of Sonderaktion Krakau along with other scholars and sent to Sachsenhausen concentration camp. He died from exhaustion brought about by diarrhea and starvation at the camp. His ashes were later buried in Rakowicki Cemetery.

As a philosopher, Garbowski was interested in evolutionary epistemology, naturalistic evolutionism and teleonomy. He was also interested in homogenism. He considered human spirituality as an evolutionary adaptation.
