= Stefan Kopeć =

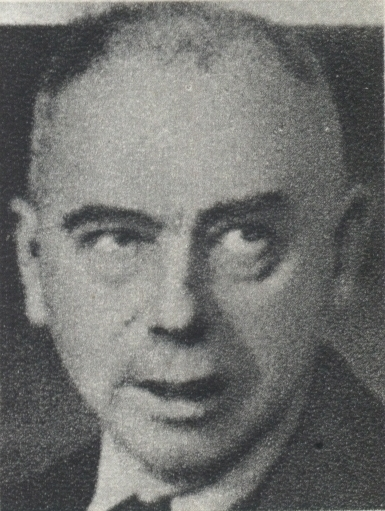

Stefan Witysław Kopeć (Polish pronunciation: [stɛfan kɔpɛt͡ɕ]; January 22, 1888 – March 11, 1941) was a Polish biologist and pioneer of insect endocrinology. He discovered the role of the insect brain in the production of prothoracicotropic hormone (PTTH). Kopeć was director at Puławy Agricultural Research Station. Along with his son, he was executed by the Germans during World War II.

== Biography ==
Stefan Kopeć was born in Warsaw, son of physician Stanisław and Ksawery née Lilpop. He studied at the 5th government gymnasium and graduated in 1906. He received a doctor of philosophy from the Jagiellonian University in Kraków. He received his PhD there in 1912 with a thesis titled Untersuchungen über Kastration und Transplantation bei Schmetterlingen, and worked for two years as an assistant to Tadeusz Garbowski. In 1914 he worked with František Vejdovský in Prague on the role of the swim bladder in fish. He worked at Puławy Agricultural Research Station in Poland between 1915 becoming its head in 1918 and working there until 1920. He also worked on embryology with Emil Godlewski Jr. In 1929, he was made director of the institute. He became the director of the Pulawy station in 1929. In 1927 he went on Rockefeller Foundation scholarship to Edinburgh to work with Francis Albert Eley Crew and at Cambridge with John Hammond. Between 1908 and 1927, Kopeć published at least 17 papers, in Polish, English and German, on insect endocrinology in various professional journals. Kopeć began his studies of the moulting of insects with Lymantria dispar from specimens caught in the wild. His subsequent scientific activities helped determine the role of the insect brain in hormone production. He was the earliest researcher to understand the importance of the insect brain, as is demonstrated by his statement in a 1917 paper: "For the normal process of metamorphosis the presence of the brain, at least up to a certain moment, is indispensable..."

Kopeć's most significant contribution was his study of neurosecretory cells in the brains of insects which secrete a crucial growth hormone, prothoracicotropic hormone (PTTH), which regulates the process of metamorphosis (ecdysteroidogenesis). He observed that nervous tissue could behave like an endocrine gland. This discovery stimulated further scientific research leading to the establishment of the field of science known as neuroendocrinology.

Kopeć's work was cut short due to his arrest by the Gestapo in 1940 together with his daughter Maria and son Stanisław in an operation against a Polish Underground State-run secret university. He was imprisoned at the Pawiak prison in Warsaw and executed by the Germans in 1941 at Palmiry, near Warsaw, together with his son and several others, as a reprisal for the killing of Igo Sym, an action of the Polish resistance, as a part of the German AB-Aktion in Poland. The University of Wrocław named its annual International Conference on Arthropods the Stefan Kopeć Memorial Conference in Kopeć's honor.

== Bibliography ==
- Kopeć, Stefan (1922). "Mutual relationship in the development of the brain and eyes of lepidoptera". Journal of Experimental Zoology. 36 (4): 458–467. Bibcode:1922JEZ....36..458K. doi:10.1002/jez.1400360405.
- Kopeć, Stefan (1924). "On the Heterogeneous Influence of Starvation of Male and of Female Insects on Their Offspring". Biological Bulletin. 46 (1): 22–34. doi:10.2307/1536517. JSTOR 1536517.
- Kopeć, Stefan (1923). "The influence of the nervous system on the development and regeneration of muscles and integument in insects". Journal of Experimental Zoology. 37 (1): 14–25. Bibcode:1923JEZ....37...14K. doi:10.1002/jez.1400370103.
- Kopeć, Stefan (1922). "Studies on the Necessity of the Brain for the Inception of Insect Metamorphosis". Biological Bulletin. 42 (6): 323–342. doi:10.2307/1536759. JSTOR 1536759.
- Kopeć, Stefan (1923). "On the offspring of rabbit-does mated with two sires simultaneously". Journal of Genetics. 13 (3): 371–382. doi:10.1007/BF02983070. S2CID 20739576.
- Kopeć, Stefan (1922). "Physiological self-differentiation of the wing-germs grafted on caterpillars of the opposite sex". Journal of Experimental Zoology. 36 (4): 468–475. Bibcode:1922JEZ....36..468K. doi:10.1002/jez.1400360406.
- Kopeć, Stefan (1926). "Is the Insect Metamorphosis Influenced by Thyroid Feeding?". Biological Bulletin. 50 (4): 339–354. doi:10.2307/1536468. JSTOR 1536468.
- Experiments on the dependence of the nuptial hue on the gonads in fish Biologia Generalis, 1927
- Kopeć, Stefan (1924). "Studies on the Influence of Inanition on the Development and the Duration of Life in Insects". Biological Bulletin. 46 (1): 1–21. doi:10.2307/1536516. JSTOR 1536516.
- Kopeć, Stefan; Greenwood, Alan W (1930). "The effect of yolk injections on the plumage of an ovariotomised brown leghornn hen". Wilhelm Roux' Archiv für Entwicklungsmechanik der Organismen. 121 (1–2): 87–95. doi:10.1007/BF00644945. PMID 28353827. S2CID 6897019.
