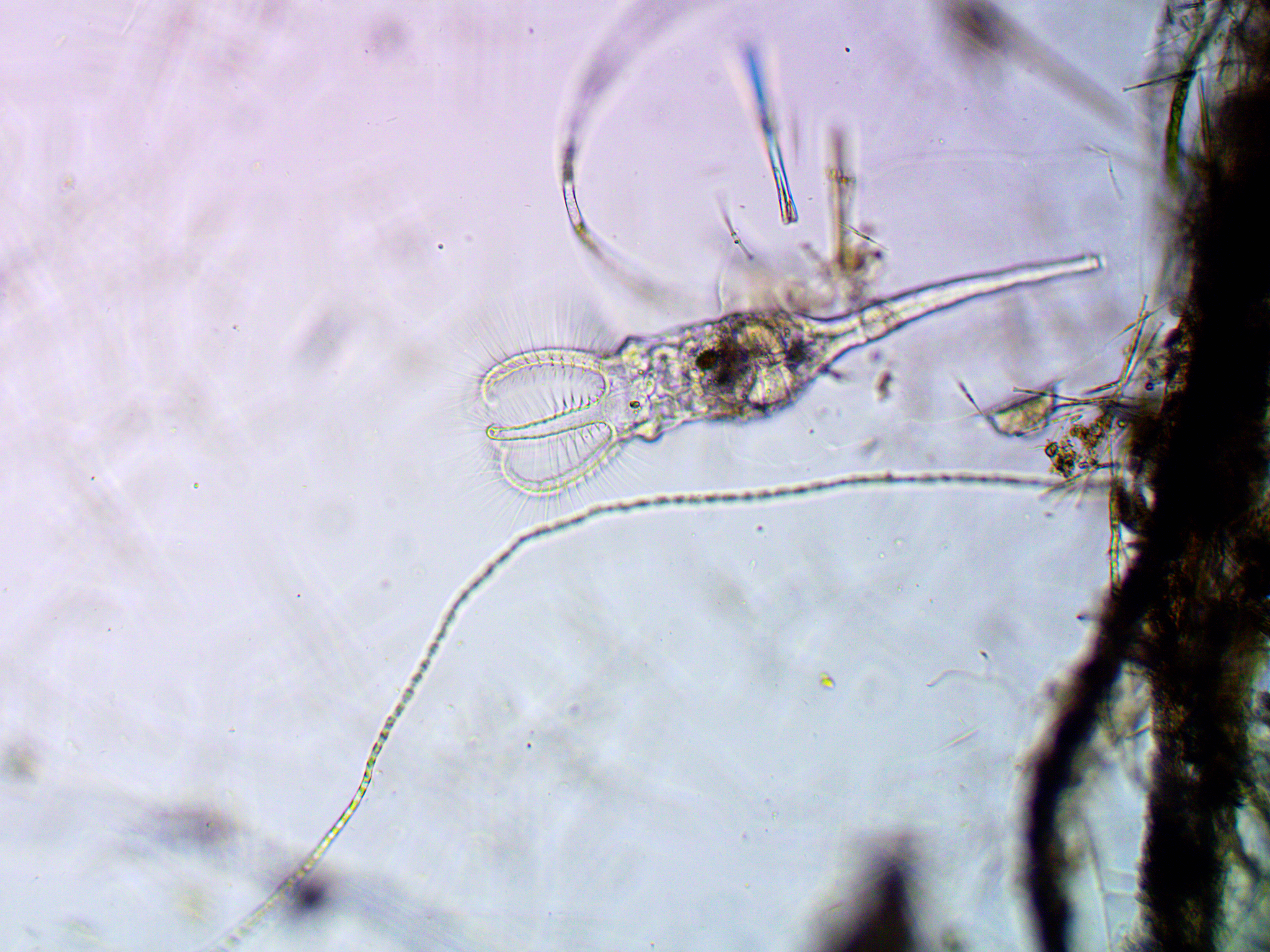
- Stephanoceros fimbriatus

Scientific classification
- Domain: Eukaryota
- Kingdom: Animalia
- Phylum: Rotifera
- Class: Monogononta
- Order: Collothecaceae
- Family: Collothecidae
- Genus: Stephanoceros; Ehrenberg, 1832

= Stephanoceros =

Genus of rotifers

Stephanoceros is a genus of rotifers belonging to the family Collothecidae.

The species of this genus are found in Europe and Northern America.

== Species ==
- Stephanoceros fimbriatus (Goldfusz, 1820)
- Stephanoceros millsii (Kellicott, 1885)
- Stephanoceros vulgaris
