= Orla Perć =

Hiking trail in Poland

- Trail blazing
- Length: 4.5 km (2.8 mi)
- Location: Tatra Mountains, Poland
- Trailheads: Zawrat Pass 49.219111°N 20.016417°E; Krzyżne Pass 49.228694°N 20.047331°E
- Use: Climbing
- Highest point: Kozi Wierch 2,291 metres (7,516 ft)
- Season: Preferably in summer
- Hazards: Falling stones, avalanches

Orla Perć, in English known as the Eagle's Path, is a tourist trail in the Tatra Mountains, in southern Poland. It is considered one of the most difficult and dangerous public paths in the entire Tatras (an equivalent to Grade 2 Scramble) and is therefore a suitable route only for experienced climbers. The path is marked with red signs. Since it was established in the early 20th century, at least 112 people have lost their lives on the route. The number of fatalities is estimated to have increased to around 140.

== Technical data ==
The route is located in the centre of the High Tatras. The total length of the accessible route is 4.5 km. Total walking time (summer, depending on trails conditions) varies between 6 and 8 hours. The highest point is Kozi Wierch at 2291 m AMSL. The path starts at Zawrat pass (2159 m AMSL) and finishes at Krzyżne pass (2112 m AMSL), leading through several peaks and traversing others. The path is exposed, leading mostly along the mountain ridge. Numerous aids for tourists are provided at the most steep and vertical stretches, including ladders, stepladders, chains and metal steps. The most frequent ground constitutes mainly granite slab, rough rubble and uneven surface. The path is linked to other routes; there are altogether eight junctions with other paths, leading to mountain shelters and chalets. The stretch from Zawrat pass to Kozi Wierch is one-way only. Falling stones and avalanches are possible along the route.

== History ==
The path was conceived in 1901, the brainchild of Franciszek Nowicki, a Polish poet and mountain guide. The route was partially funded, constructed and marked by Fr. Walenty Gadowski between 1903 and 1906 with the aid of a few locals; however, the junctions and other auxiliary routes were led and marked by 1911. After several fatal accidents, in 2006 a mountain guide Irena Rubinowska and Piotr Mikucki, a film director, launched an appeal to the authorities of the Tatra National Park to dismount all climbing aids along the path and change it to via ferrata. The appeal met with different reactions from groups and professional lobbies involved in the tourist business. It was concluded that this is a historic trail, and will remain unchanged. As many accidents took place when passing in the opposite direction, the TPN Directorate has introduced one-way traffic at the most difficult section of Orla Perć from Zawrat to Kozi Wierch in July 2007.

== Gallery ==
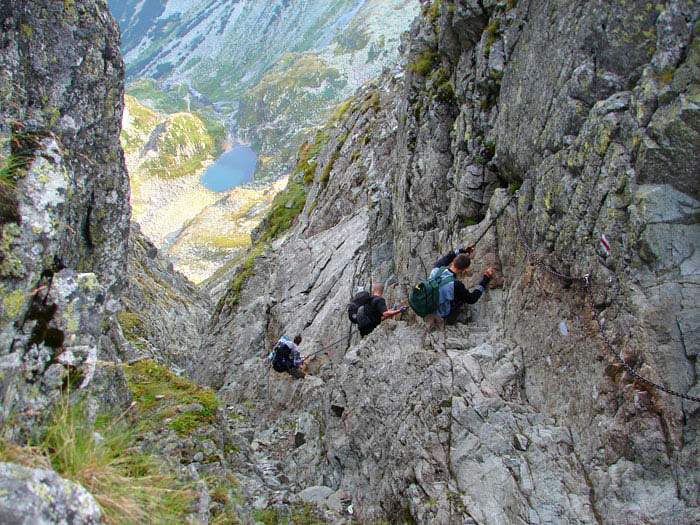
Descent through The Honoratka Couloir

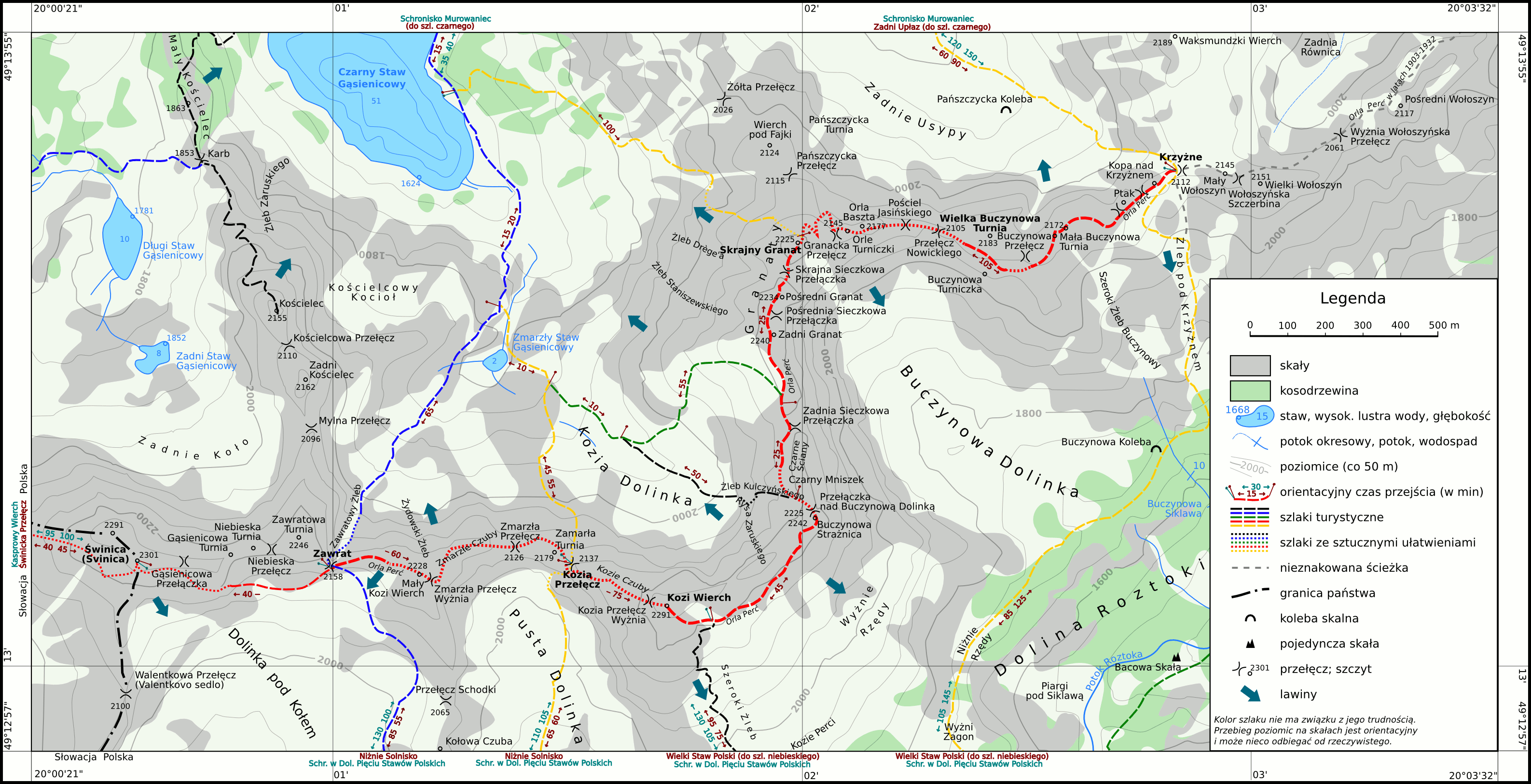
Map of the path

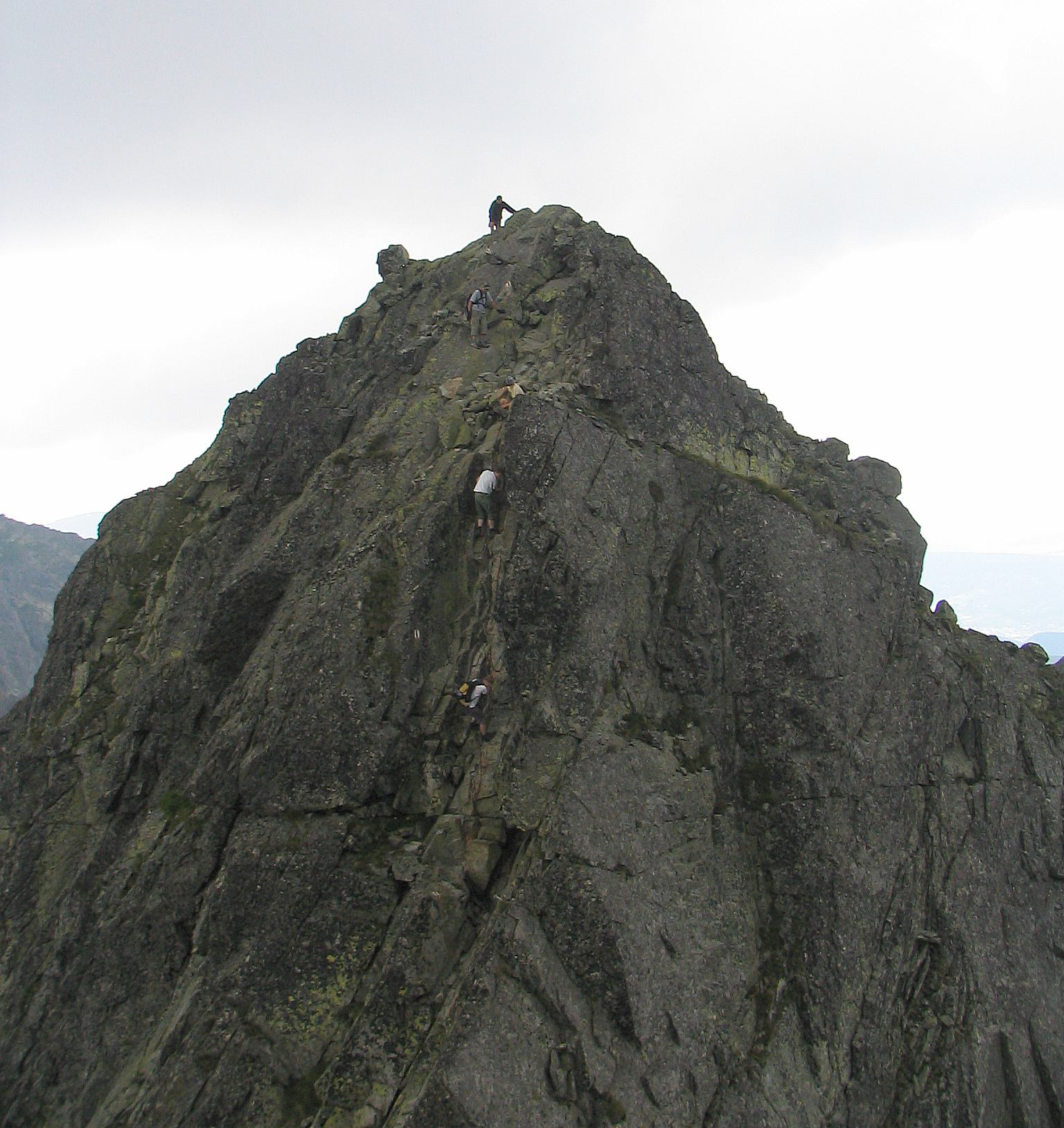
The path descends from Kozie Czuby

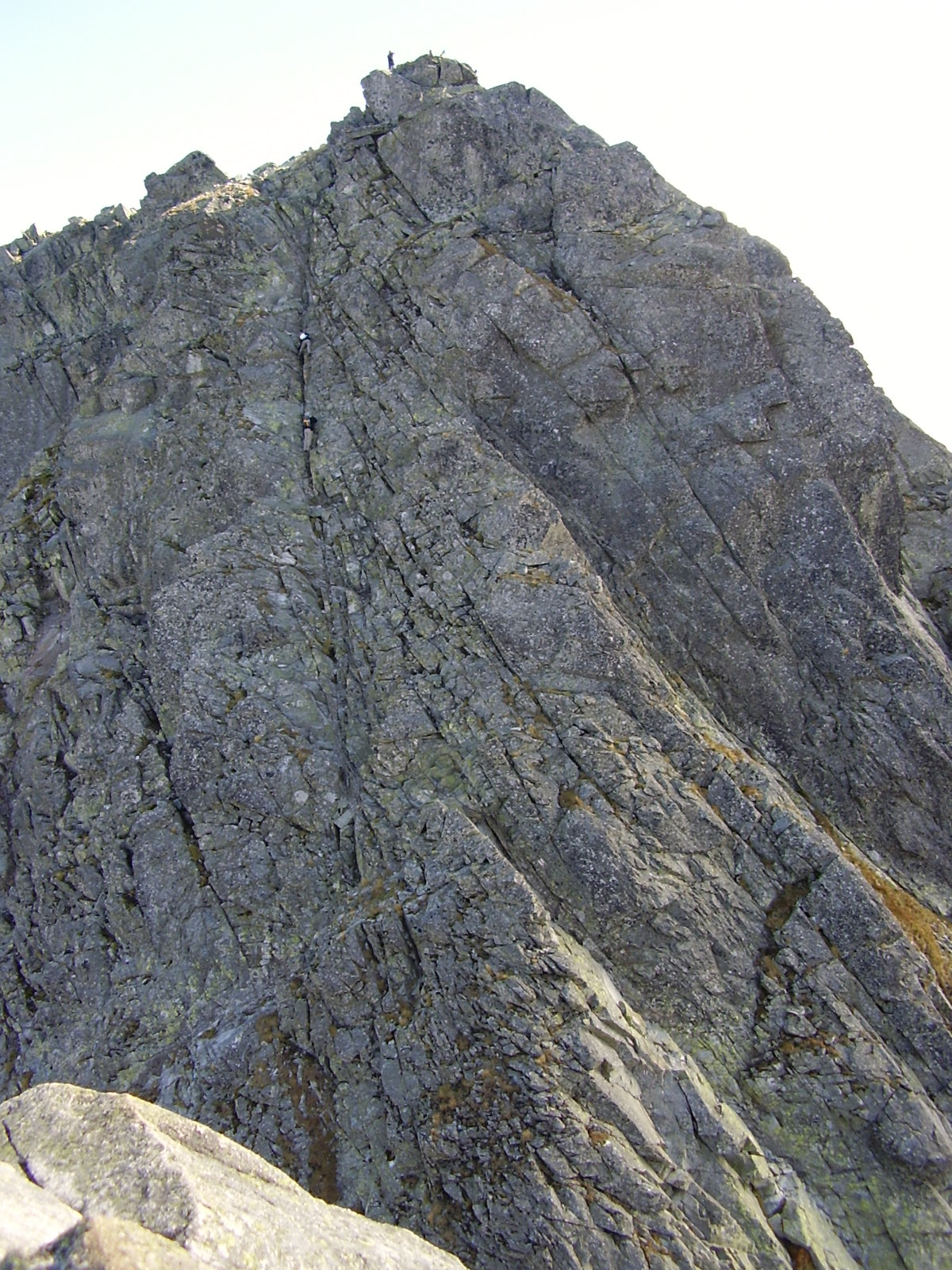
The path on Kozi Wierch

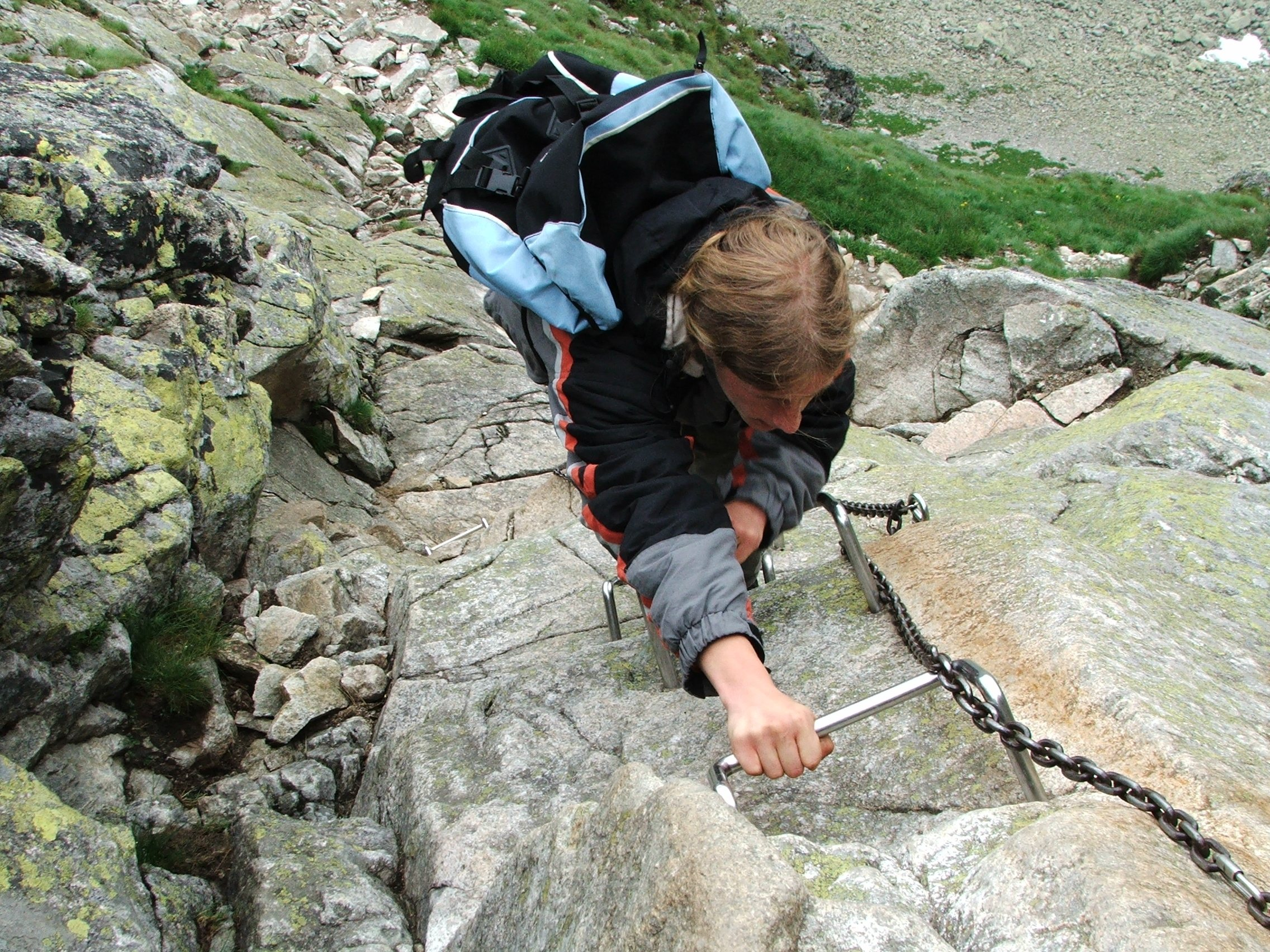
Climbing aids on the path

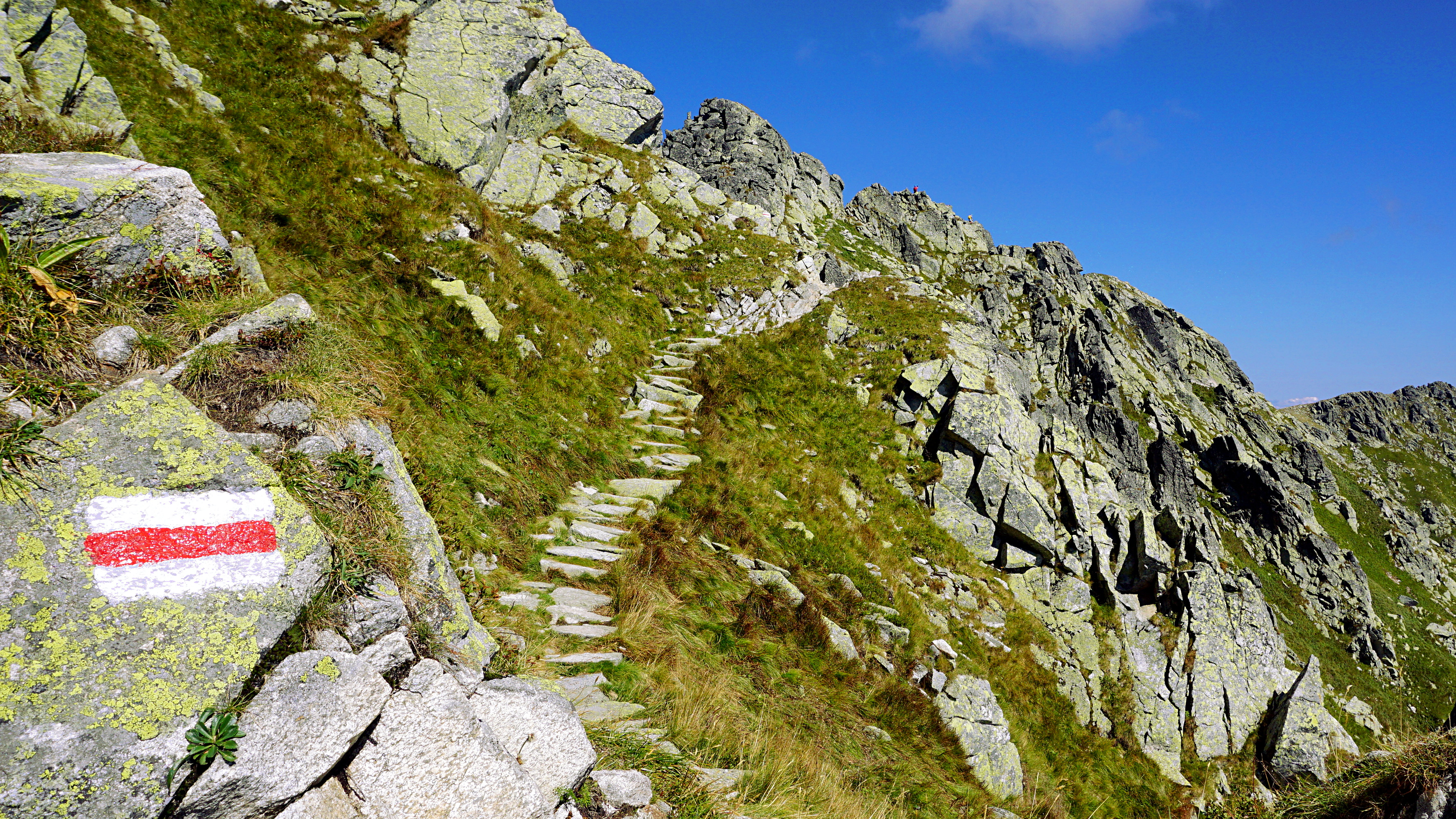
Rare easily hikeable fragment

== See also ==
- Tatra Volunteer Search and Rescue
- Tourism in Poland
