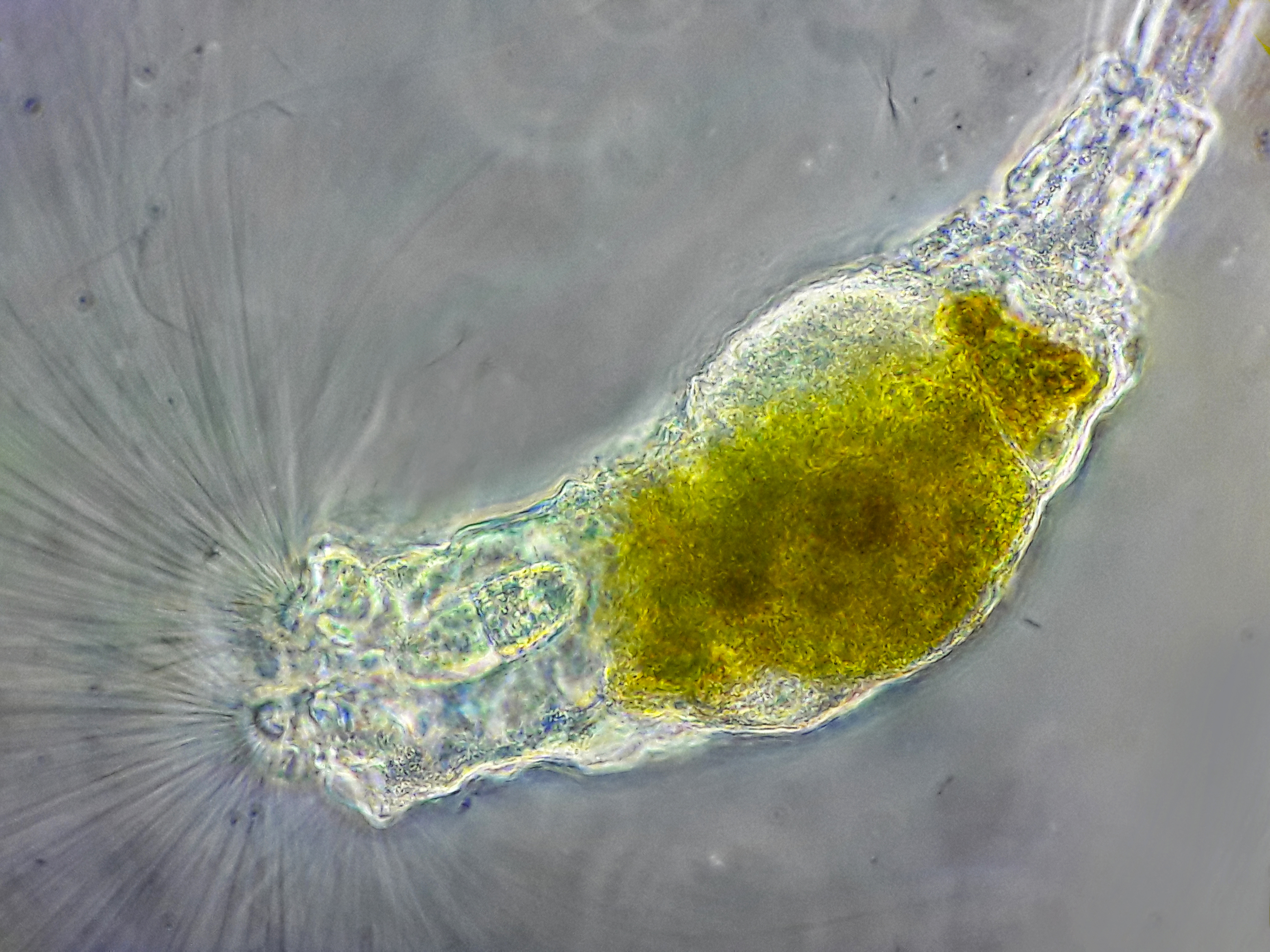
- Collotheca sp.

Scientific classification
- Domain: Eukaryota
- Kingdom: Animalia
- Phylum: Rotifera
- Class: Monogononta
- Order: Collothecaceae
- Family: Collothecidae

= Collothecidae =

Family of rotifers

Collothecidae is a family of rotifers belonging to the order Collothecaceae.

Genera:

- Collotheca Harring, 1913
- Stephanoceros Ehrenberg, 1832
