= Nestor Kysilevskyi =

Ukrainian sculptor (1909–2000)

- Нестор Львович Кисілевський
- Born: 20 September 1909; Yabluniv, now Ivano-Frankivsk Oblast, Ukraine
- Died: 14 April 2000 (aged 90); Lviv
- Education: Kraków Academy of Arts
- Occupation: Sculptor

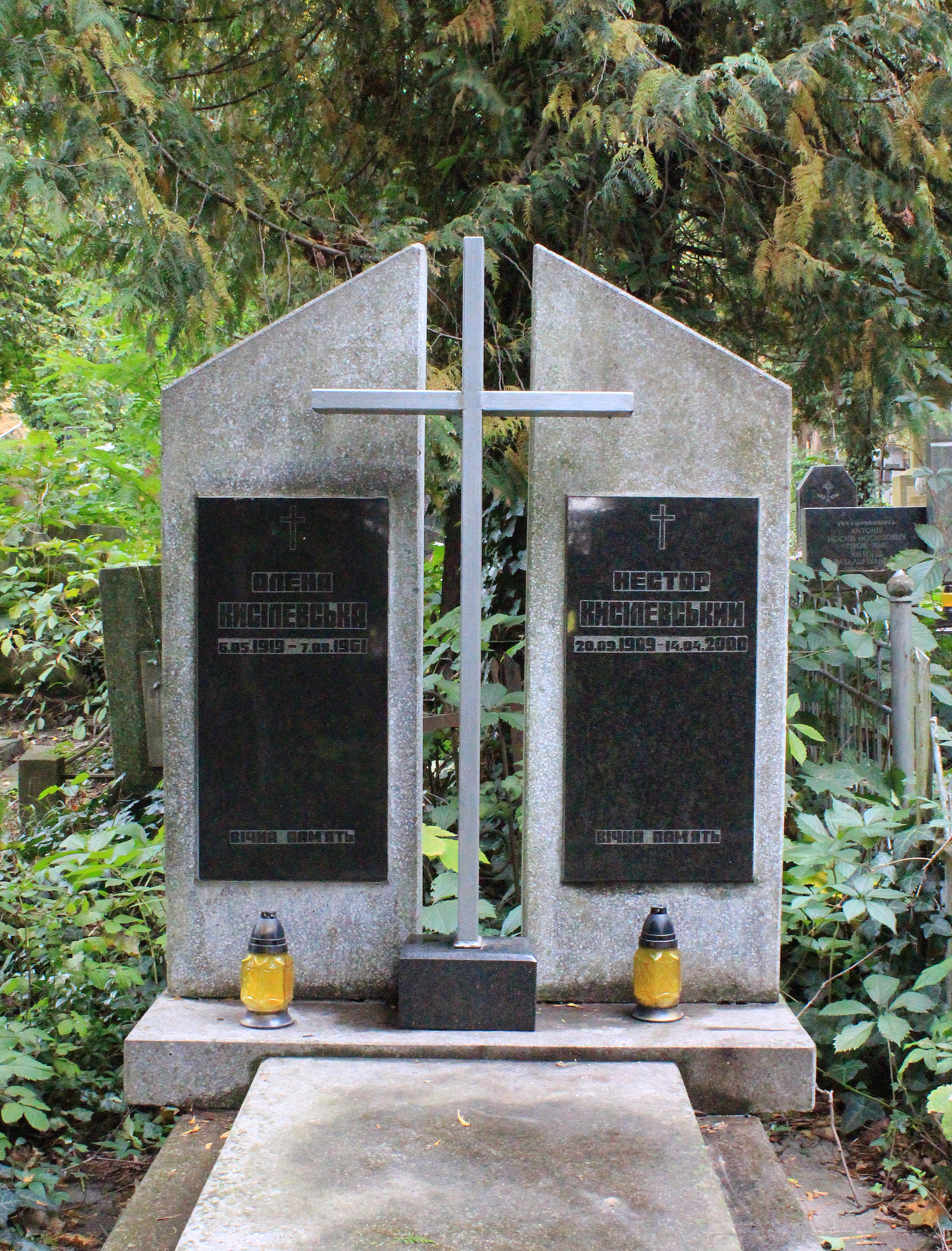
Tombstone on the grave of the Kysilevskyi family.

Nestor Kysilevskyi (Ukrainian: Нестор Львович Кисілевський; 20 September 1909 – 14 April 2000) was a Ukrainian sculptor. Member of the Kraków Art Association "Zarevo" (1934–1941) and the Union of Ukrainian Fine Artists (1941–1944).

== Biography ==
Nestor Kysilevskyi was born on 20 September 1909 in the village of Yabluniv, now a rural settlement of the Yabluniv Hromada in the Kosiv Raion of Ivano-Frankivsk Oblast of Ukraine.

In 1928–1933 and 1937–1938, he studied at the Kraków Academy of Arts (teachers E. Wittig, K. Laszka), and in 1935 he studied casting techniques at the State School of Decorative Arts and Artistic Industry in Poznań. Under the guidance of Vasyl Trybushnyi, he worked in his ceramic workshop together with Serhii Lytvynenko. In 1942–1945 he was active in the Lviv studio of Oleksa Novakivskyi.

In 1942, he was the head of the ceramics department of the Lviv Art and Industrial School. In 1945–1948 he worked as a teacher at the Lviv School of Applied Arts.

In 1948–1956 he was repressed and exiled to Siberia. Later he worked at the theater in Karaganda (Kazakhstan). From 1961 he lived in Lviv, where he anonymously made tombstones and park sculptures.

He died on 14 April, 2000 in Lviv. He was buried on the 84th field of Lychakiv Cemetery.

== Creativity ==
In 1934–1935, he participated in the 6th exhibition of the Association of Independent Ukrainian Artists in Lviv; in 1939, he took part in the exhibition of the Polish Society of Fine Arts in the Palace of Art in Kraków. During the 1920s and 1930s, he carved in plaster, terracotta, and bronze.

Main works:

- portrait busts – portrait busts "Batko" (1927), "Divchyna", "Holova" (both from 1934), "Bohdan Lepkyi" (circa 1936), "Andrei Sheptytskyi" (1937, plaster; found in 1989 in O. Novakivskyi's house-workshop; presented by the sculptor to the Andrey Sheptytsky National Museum of Lviv);
- figurative historical and patriotic compositions – "Strilets", "Zaporozhets", "Banduryst" (all – 1934–1939);
- images of animals – "Psy"; "Kin" (ca. 1934), "Rozhukani koni v stepu" (1936), "Serna" (1938).
