= Henryk Wielowieyski =

Polish biologist (1860–1924)

Henryk Wielowieyski Germanized as Heinrich von Wielowiejski (18 May 1860 – 3 June 1924) was a Polish noble, biologist and politician. He served as member of the Austrian parliament from 1891 to 1907, as well as being a lecturer in the University of Vienna and later at the Jagiellonian University.

== Biography ==
Wielowieyski was born on 18 May 1860 in Lviv, to landowner Władysław (died 1895). He studied at the Stanisławów Gymnasium until 1878 and then studied philosophy, zoology, botany and chemistry at the University of Lviv (1878–1880, under Bronisław Radziszewski), the University of Jena (1880–81, under Oskar Hertwig), and at Leipzig (1881–82). He received his doctorate from Leipzig University in 1882 with studies on light production in the Lampyridae under Rudolf Leuckart. He continued studies in Vienna, Munich, Berlin and Paris before becoming an adjunct at Leipzig. In 1884, he became a lecturer at the University of Lviv. He studied blood circulation in insects. In 1908, he joined Jagiellonian University to succeed Maksymilian Nowicki. Here he organized the experimental station in Mydlniki. He was the owner of Władypol Estate where he retired. He served as a member of the house of representatives from 1891 to 1907. He died on 3 June 1924, aged 64.
