= Museum "Wooden Sculpture" =

Museum in Yabluniv, Kosiv, Ukraine

Coordinates: 48°24′05″N 24°55′36″E

Museum "Wooden Sculpture", or the Wooden Sculpture Museum (Ukrainian: Музей «Лісова скульптура») was created in 2008 by artist Igor Fartushnyi. The museum is located in village Yabluniv, Kosiv Raion, Ivano-Frankivsk Oblast, Ukraine. The museum exhibition consists of master Igor's works.

== Museum exhibition ==
Wooden Sculpture Museum exhibition includes more than 100 sculptures made by the artist during his life. Even more sculptures are under the creation process. They are of the different themes: real and fantastic birds, animals, people. The idea is not to create something totally new from the wood, but help the nature to show and express its own art.

The exhibition can be visited almost at any time, since the museum is located in the yard of the artist's home. The museum is a part of Prykarpattia Museum Ring.

== About the master ==
Igor Fartushnyi was born on January 2, 1947, in village Serafymtsi, Ivano-Frankivsk Oblast, Ukraine in the family of teachers.
