= Auxesis (biology) =

Auxesis (from the Greek word meaning increase; grow) refers to growth from an increase in cell size rather than an increase in the number of cells. Auxetic growth occurs in certain tissues, such as muscle, of the higher animals as well as in some organisms, especially eutelic ones, such as nematodes, tunicates, and rotifers.

In plant physiology, an auxetic substance will tend to increase cell growth without any cell division. Auxins are auxetic plant hormones.

== See also ==
- Hypertrophy
- Merisis
