= Franciszek Kasparek =

Polish jurist and professor

Franciszek Ksawery Kasparek (Sambor, 29 October 1844 – 4 August 1903, Kraków) was a Polish jurist, professor of law and rector of Kraków University, founder of the first chair in international law in Poland (at Kraków University), and member of the Polish Academy of Learning in Kraków.

He was brother-in-law of biologist Professor Maksymilian Nowicki of Kraków University, and uncle of poet Franciszek Nowicki.

== See also ==
- List of Poles
