= Kozi Wierch =

Mountain in Poland

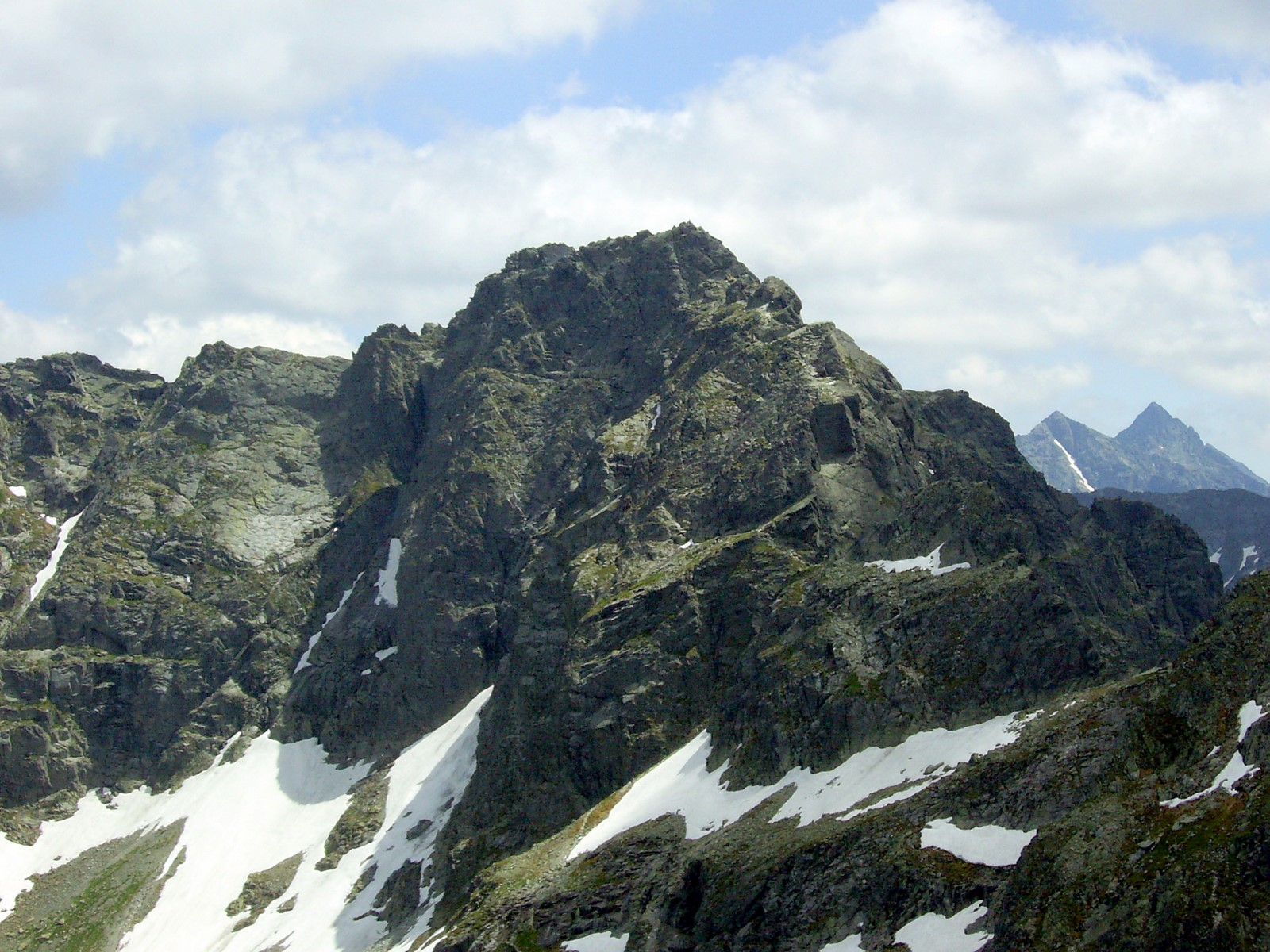
- Kozi Wierch seen from Kościelec

Highest point
- Elevation: 2,291 m (7,516 ft)
- Prominence: 168 m (551 ft)
- Coordinates: 49°13′06″N 20°01′43″E

Geography
- Country: Poland
- Voivodship: Lesser Poland
- Parent range: High Tatras, Tatra Mountains

Climbing
- First ascent: 1867 by Eugeniusz Janota and Maciej Sieczka

Kozi Wierch is a mountain situated in the High Tatras mountain range in Poland, between the Gąsienicowa Valley and the Valley of Five Polish Lakes. At 2,291 meters (7,516 ft), it's the highest peak located entirely within the borders of Poland.

Kozi Wierch is also the highest point of the Orla Perć tourist trail, which is generally considered one of the most dangerous and difficult trails in the Tatras.
