= Maksymilian Nowicki =

Polish zoology professor and pioneer conservationist

Maksymilian Siła-Nowicki
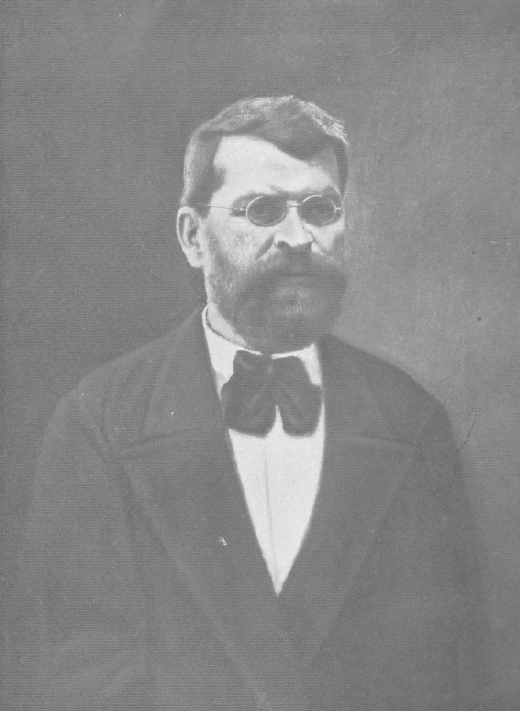
- Maksymilian Nowicki
- Born: 9 October 1826; Jabłonów, Kingdom of Galicia and Lodomeria, Austrian Empire
- Died: 30 October 1890 (aged 64); Kraków, Grand Duchy of Kraków, Austria-Hungary
- Occupation: zoology professor

Academic work
- Doctoral students: Antoni Wierzejski; Władysław Kulczyński

Maksymilian Siła-Nowicki (9 October 1826 – 30 October 1890) was a Polish zoology professor and pioneer conservationist in Austrian Poland. His major studies were on the beetles and lepidoptera of eastern Galicia. Later in life, he was involved in the conservation of the fauna of the Tatra Mountains.

He was the father of the poet Franciszek Nowicki and a brother-in-law of Franciszek Kasparek, law professor and rector at Kraków University.

== Life ==
Nowicki was born in Jabłonów in eastern Galicia. He attended the local gymnasium (secondary school) and entered the University of Lwów in 1848 to study law, but political problems forced him to quit those studies. He then taught in the countryside of eastern Galicia (1852–63) at Brody, later in Płotycz near Tarnopol, then found an opportunity to do research at the University of Vienna and in 1863 received a doctorate from the University of Lviv and became a professor of zoology at Kraków University (1863–90).

In 1873 he collected specimens for the Dzieduszycki museum in Lviv and was inducted into the Kraków-based Academy of Learning. Also in 1873, he co-founded the Tatras Society (Towarzystwo Tatrzańskie).

In 1879 he founded the National Fishing Society (Krajowe Towarzystwo Rybackie) and through it worked on fishing zones, fishing regulations, and stocking of game fishes. His greatest academic achievements were in entomology, ichthyology and ornithology.

Nowicki sought to give a practical bent to his research. He wrote: "In the interest of husbandry in this country, it is appropriate to develop a knowledge of animals that are harmful to husbandry... and of animals that are useful to [it]." It was chiefly thanks to him that the Galician Sejm in 1868 passed a law protecting chamois, marmots and Alpine birds in the Tatra Mountains.

Nowicki was the initiator of, and driving force behind, the Physiographic Commission (Komisja Fizjograficzna) of the Academy of Learning, and was a member of many other learned societies.

== See also ==
- List of Poles
