= Luchka =

Luchka Лучка
- Selo
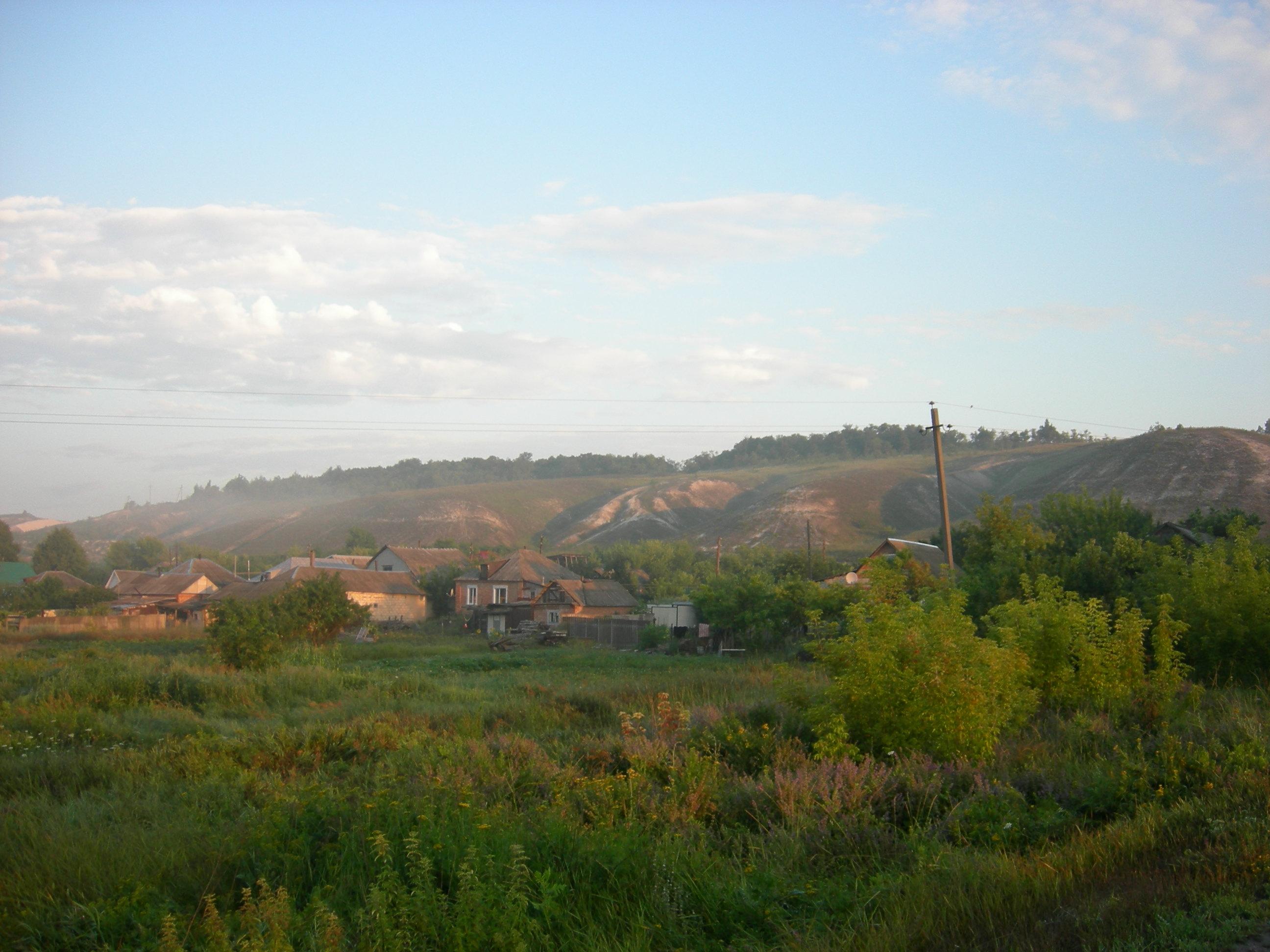

- Location within Belgorod Oblast Location within Russia
- Coordinates: 50°13′N 38°08′E
- Country: Russia
- Region: Belgorod Oblast
- District: Valuysky District
- Time zone: UTC+3:00

Luchka (Russian: Лучка) is a rural locality (a selo) in Valuysky District, Belgorod Oblast, Russia. The population was 133 as of 2010. There is 1 street.

== Geography ==
Luchka is located 4 km east of Valuyki (the district's administrative centre) by road. Valuyki is the nearest rural locality.
