= Franciszek Nowicki =

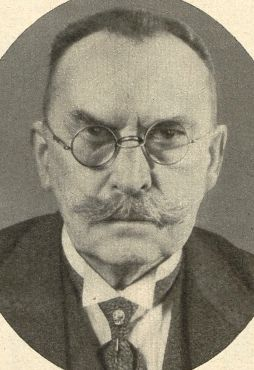
Franciszek Nowicki

Franciszek Henryk Siła-Nowicki (29 January 1864, in Kraków, Austrian Empire – 3 September 1935, in Zawoja, Poland) was a Young Poland poet, a recreational mountaineer, socialist activist, and designer of the Orla Perć (Eagle's Path) High Tatras mountain trail.

== Life ==
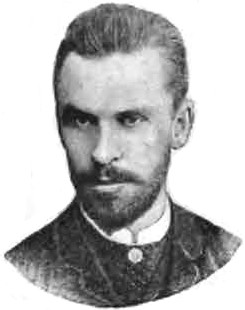
Franciszek Nowicki, 1893

Franciszek Nowicki was the son of Maksymilian Nowicki — a zoologist and pioneer Polish conservationist — and Antonina Kasparek, sister of Franciszek Kasparek, professor of international law, rector of Kraków University, and founder of the first chair in international law in Poland.

As a university student, Nowicki co-edited (with Kazimierz Tetmajer, Andrzej Niemojewski, Artur Górski, and others) a socialist-leaning journal, Ognisko (Focus).

In 1890 he co-founded, with Ignacy Daszyński and others, the Polish Socialist-Democratic Party (Polska Partia Socjalistyczno-Demokratyczna).

From 1894 he taught at a gimnazjum (secondary school).

On 5 February 1901 Nowicki proposed to Towarzystwo Tatrzańskie (the Tatras Society) the building of Orla Perć (the Eagle's Trail), which was partly realized in 1903-07. In 1902 he climbed to the then-as-yet-unnamed Przełęcz Nowickiego (Nowicki's Pass) in the Buczynowe Turnie Tatras peaks.

In 1924 Nowicki retired from teaching, and in 1934 he became an honorary member of the Polish Writers' Union (Związek Zawodowy Literatów Polskich).

== Writings ==
Nowicki published poems and stories and, in 1891, his sole little volume of Poems (Poezje), comprising two parts: "The Tatras" ("Tatry") and "Songs of Time" ("Pieśni czasu"). He also translated from German, e.g., Goethe's idyll of Hermann and Dorothea.

He ceased writing poetry following an unhappy romantic involvement.

== See also ==
- List of Polish-language poets
- Young Poland
- List of Poles

== Bibliography ==
- Ignacy Daszyński, Pamiętniki (Memoirs), vol. I, Krakόw, Z.R.S.S. Proletarjat, 1925.
- Mała encyklopedia powszechna PWN (Small PWN Universal Encyclopedia), Warsaw, Państwowe Wydawnictwo Naukowe, 1959, p. 633.
