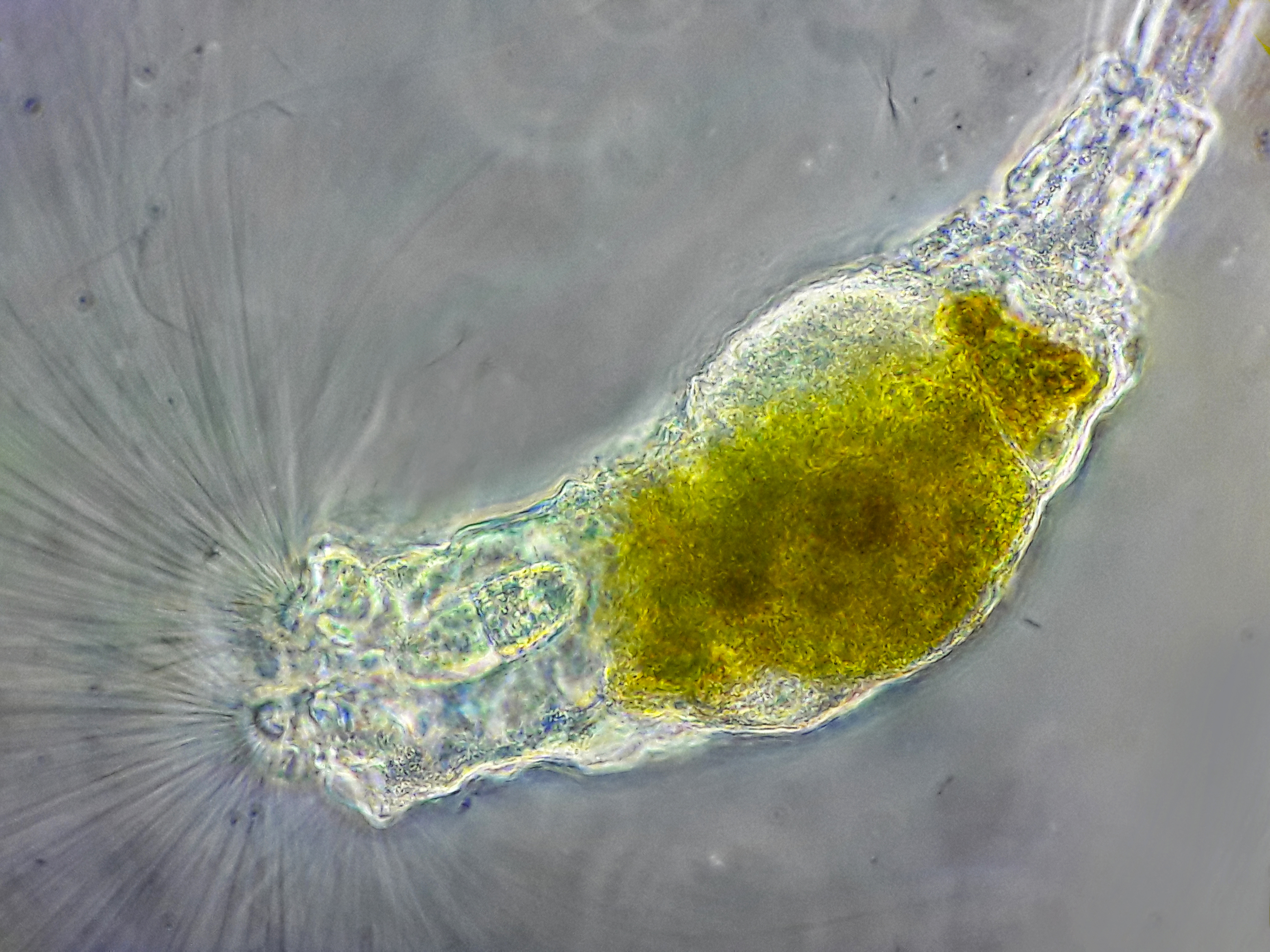
- Collotheca sp.

Scientific classification
- Domain: Eukaryota
- Kingdom: Animalia
- Phylum: Rotifera
- Class: Monogononta
- Superorder: Gnesiotrocha
- Order: Collothecaceae

= Collothecaceae =

Order of rotifers

Collothecaceae is an order of rotifers belonging to the class Monogononta.

Families:

- Atrochidae
- Collothecidae
