= Antoni Wierzejski =

Polish zoologist (1843–1916)

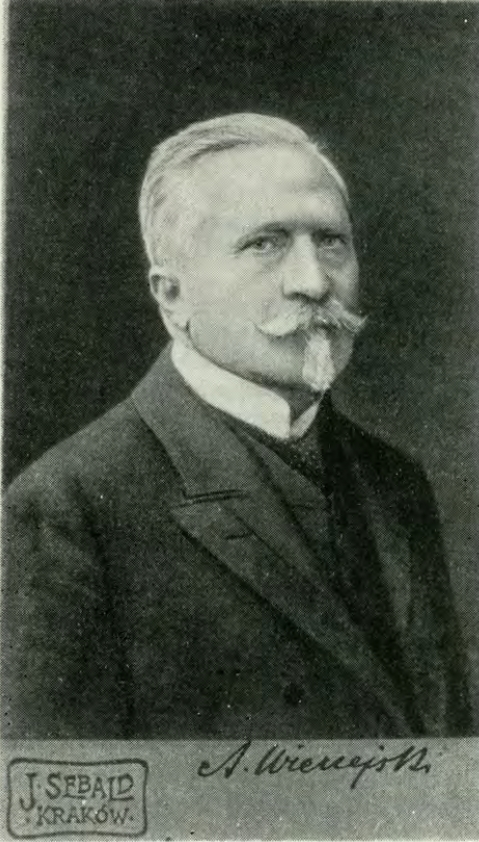
In 1905

Antoni Wierzejski (3 May 1843 – 9 August 1916) was a Polish zoologist and a specialist in hydrobiology. He studied the fauna of the lakes in the Tatra mountains, describing many new species.

Wierzejski was born in Skała Podolska to Józef (1805–1847) and Maria née Winiarski. One of six children, he was just four when his father, who worked as a treasury clerk, died. Wierzejski went to school in Lviv and Stanisławów. He studied natural sciences at the Jagiellonian University from 1865 and became an assistant to Maksymilian Nowicki. He received a doctorate in 1871 with a dissertation on animal behaviour. In 1875 he visited Vienna and Graz and spent half a year at the zoological station in Trieste. He then taught at the St. Jacek Gymnasium and from 1888 at the St. Anne's Gymnasium. Habilitating in 1878 he also became a part-time associate professor at the Jagiellonian University in 1884. He taught comparative anatomy and later became a full professor. He also headed the zoological institute and museum following the death of Nowicki in 1890. He studied the fauna of inland waters and also studied animal embryology and development. His students included Alfred Lityński and Kazimierz Simm. He retired in 1912 and served in the government council.
