= List of lakes of Slovakia =

Lakes, dams, rivers, and karst lakes in Slovakia

Map of Slovakia.

This is a list of lakes of Slovakia that includes dams, rivers, and karst lakes in alphabetical order. The names of most lakes in Slovakia contain the word "jazero", which is Slovak for "lake".

Most the lakes located in Slovakia were originally glaciers, with a majority of them located in the Tatra Mountains between the Žilina and Prešov region.

== Lakes ==
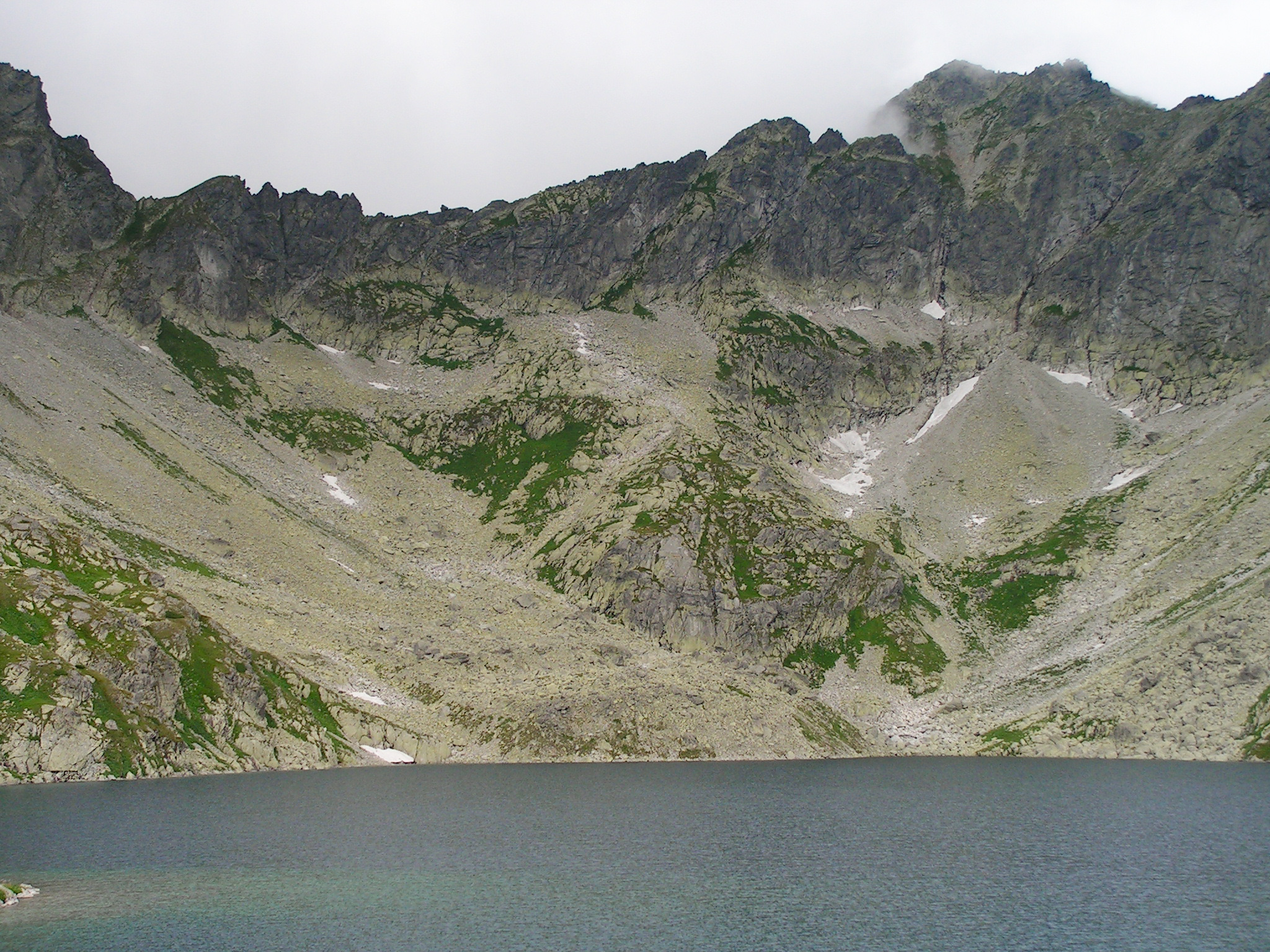
The Veľké Hincovo Pleso.

The largest lake in Slovakia is Veľké Hincovo Pleso in the High Tatras, with an area of 20.08 ha. It is also the deepest Slovak lake - the maximum depth reaches 53.7 m. Its surface remains frozen for around 270 days per year. In addition to the Tatra lakes, Slovakia also has many other lakes, dams and water bodies. Some Slovak dams and water works, which were originally built for the purposes of irrigation, energy production or flood protection, are now also used for relaxation and recreation. Lakes in Slovakia are natural or originated as gravel pits or quarries that were later flooded by water.

The highest wind speed ever recorded in Slovakia was recorded in the Skalnaté Pleso lake on 29 November 1965, when a wind with the speed of 78.6 metres per second (283 km/h) was recorded. In November 2021, there was a rare occurrence, as Pleso dried out entirely. This was the result of a dry period, as it is filled solely by precipitation, and continued evaporation. The lake has refilled since.

== List ==
Name	Image	Surface area (hectares)	Location	Notes
Baňur		0,179 ha	Prešov Region	
Bezodné		3 ha	Bratislava Region	
Blatné		1.55 ha	Ľubochňa	
Čierny Feld		1 ha	Bratislava Region	
Devínske		—	Stupava	
Hlboké (lake)		—	Bratislava Region	
Izra		3.7 ha	Košice Region	It is 250 metres (820 ft) long and 210 metres (690 ft) wide.
Lake in Jazernici		—	Jazernica	
Jezerské lake		2 ha	Jezersko	
Kotlík		1.03 ha	Valaškovce	
Kráľová		187 ha	Galanta District	Reservoir built in 1985.
Ksenino lake		0.04 ha	Osturňa	
Lúčanské lake		0.17 ha	Lúčka	
Lukové pliesko		0.2 ha	Demänovská Dolina	
Malá Izra		1 ha	Košice Region	
Malé lake		7 ha	Osturňa	
Malé Morské oko		0.33 ha	Remetské Hámre	It was formed by landslide processes in an environment of volcanic rocks.
Morské oko		13 ha	Prešov Region	
Opatovské jazierko		2.4 ha	Medveďov	
Osturnianske jazero		14 ha	Osturňa	
Popradské pleso		6.88 ha	Prešov Region	
Puchmajerovej jazierko		0.10 ha	Žilina Region	
Silické lake		1.22 ha	Silica	Is the largest Karst lake in Slovakia.
Skalnaté Pleso		1.23 ha	Prešov Region	The highest wind speed ever recorded in Slovakia was recorded there on 29 November 1965, when a wind with the speed of 78.6 metres per second (283 km/h) was recorded.
Smradľavé jazero		—	Kečovo	
Štrbské pleso		19.76 ha	Prešov Region	Is the second-largest glacial lake on the Slovak side of the High Tatras.
Tajba		27.3 ha	Streda nad Bodrogom	
Váh Oxbow Lake		0.2 ha	Komárno	It was formed in 1973 by damming a branch of the Váh River, creating a separated oxbow lake.
Veľké Hincovo pleso		20.1 ha	Prešov Region	Part of the Tatra lakes; largest lake in Slovakia.
Veľké jazero		8 ha	Košice Region	
Vrbické pleso		0.69 ha	Žilina Region	
Žakýlske pleso		6 ha	Banská Bystrica Region	

== See also ==
- List of rivers of Slovakia
- Geography of Slovakia
