= Skalnaté Pleso =

Skalnaté Pleso may refer to:

- Skalnaté Pleso (lake), a lake in Slovakia
- Skalnaté Pleso Observatory, an astronomical observatory
- a shorthand for the Atlas Coeli Skalnate Pleso 1950.0, a popular sky atlas for amateur astronomers that was compiled at the observatory. It was reissued by Sky Publishing Corporation as the Skalnate Pleso Atlas of the Heavens.
