= Tatra lakes =

Group of around 200 lakes in the Tatra Mountains

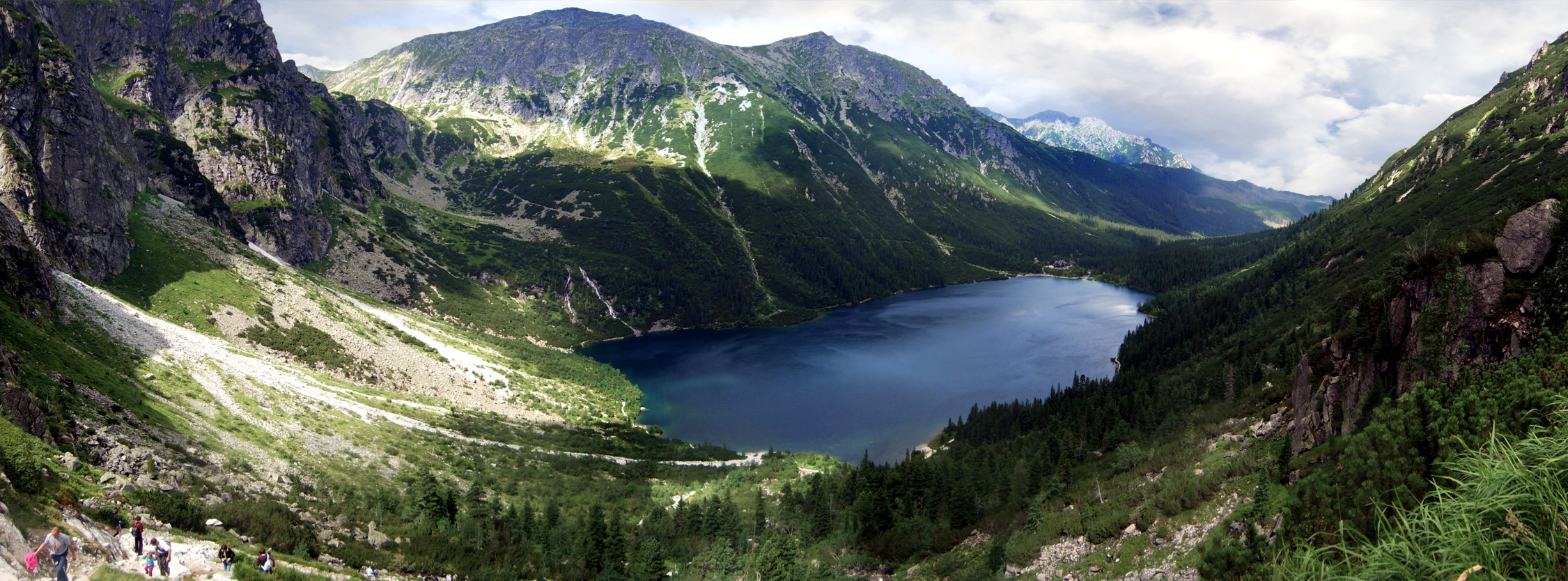
Biggest of the lakes – Morskie Oko

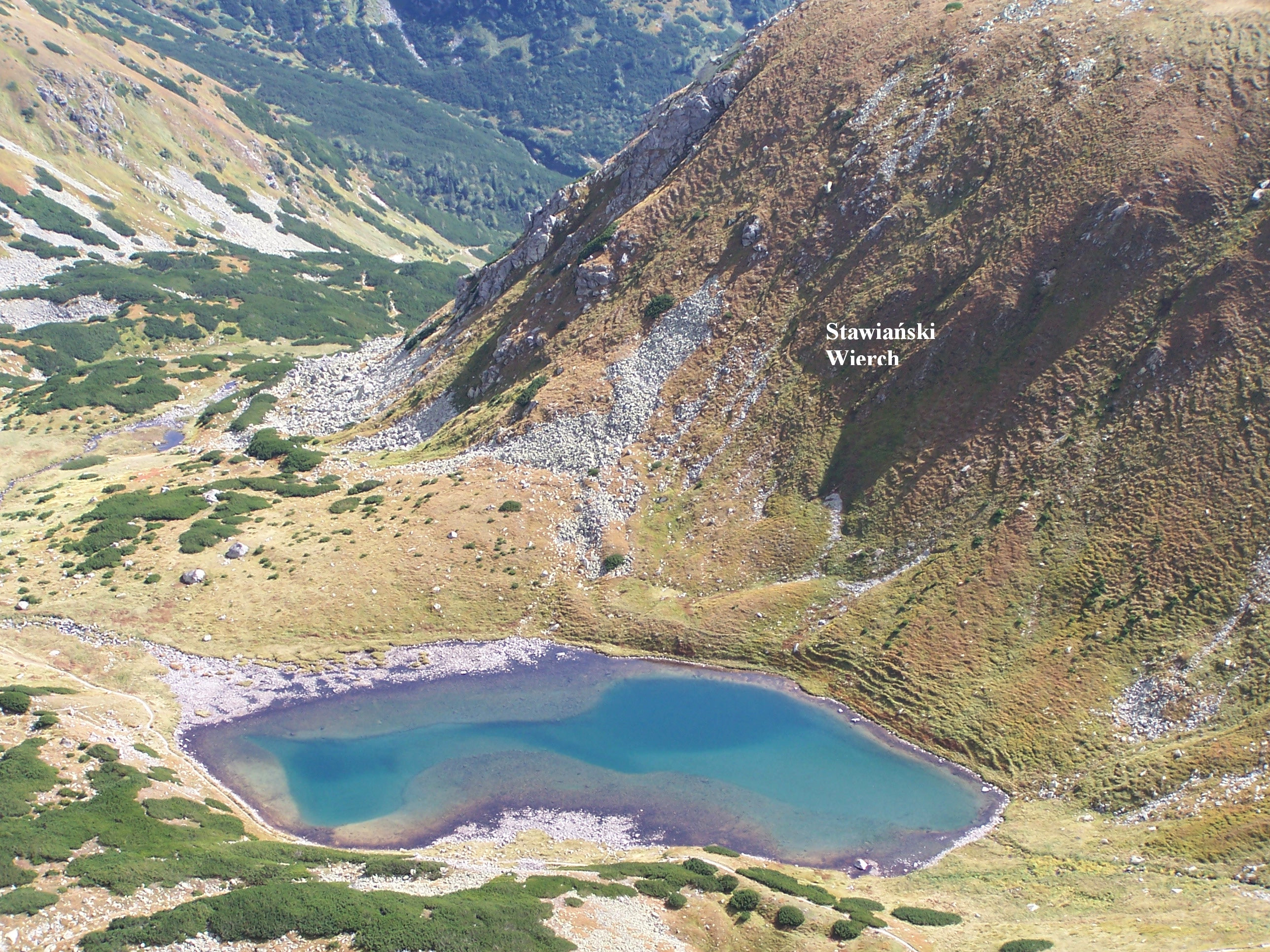
Different shades of water in the Nižné Jamnícke pleso

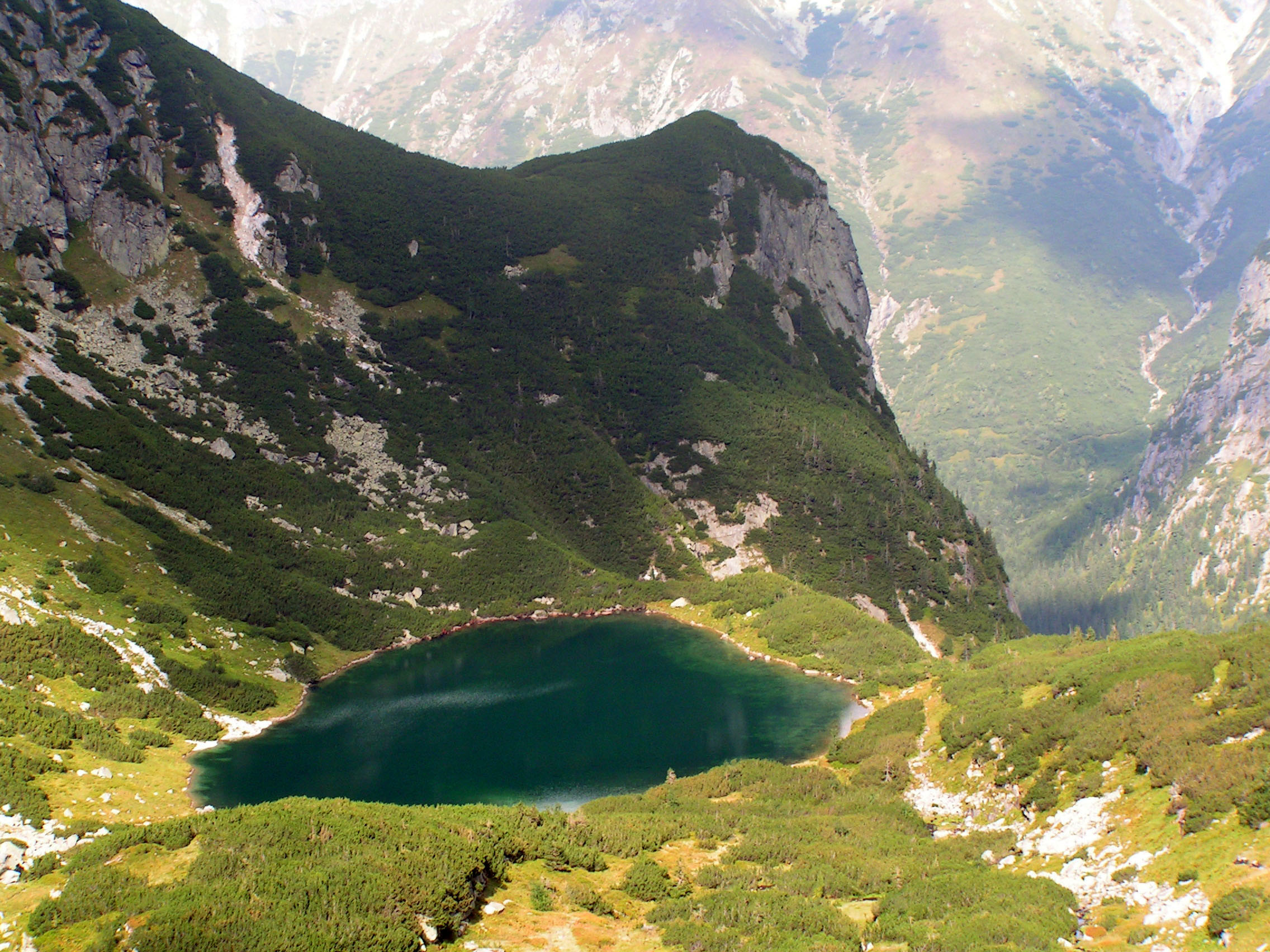
Ťažké pleso

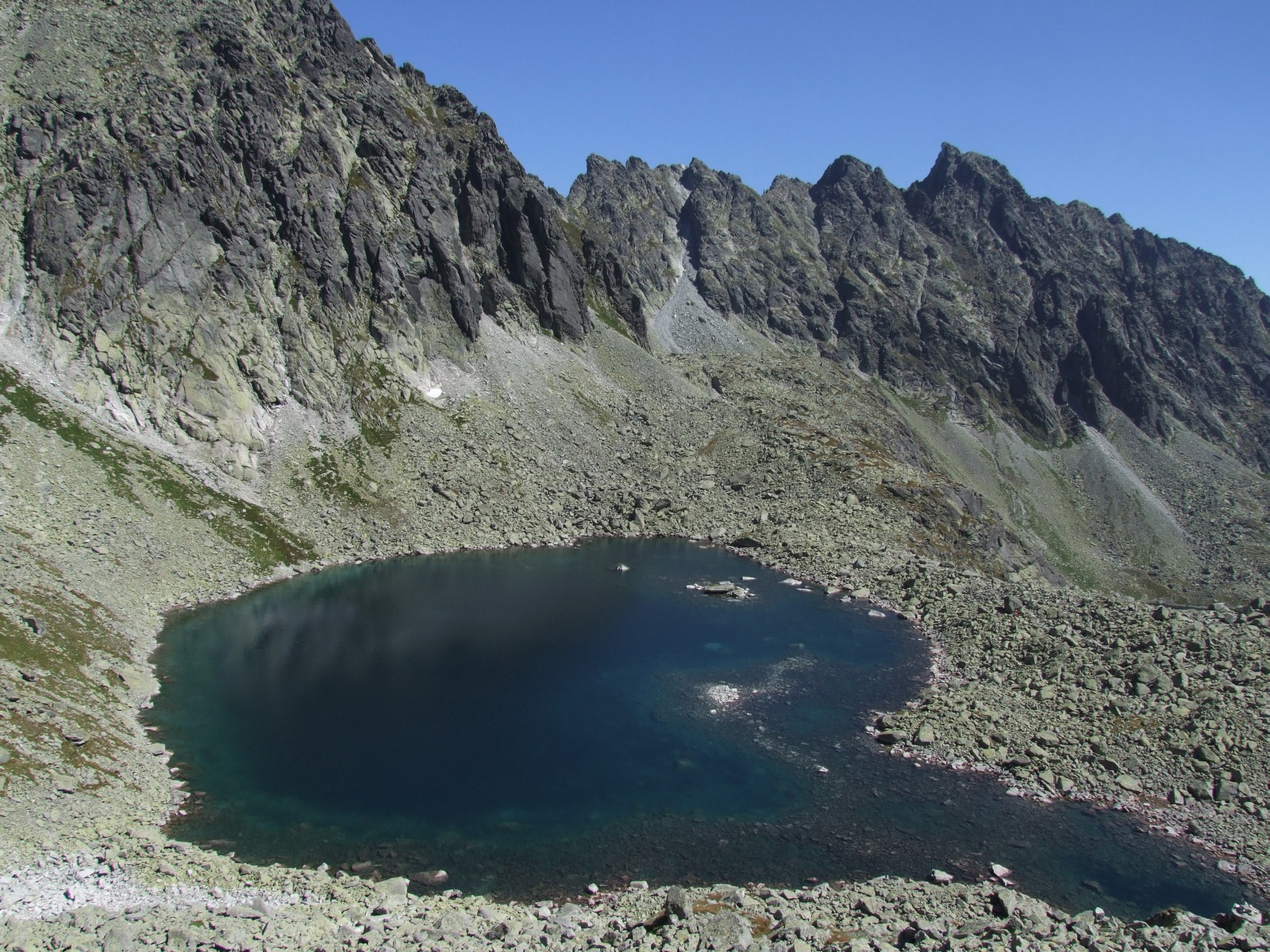
Capie pleso

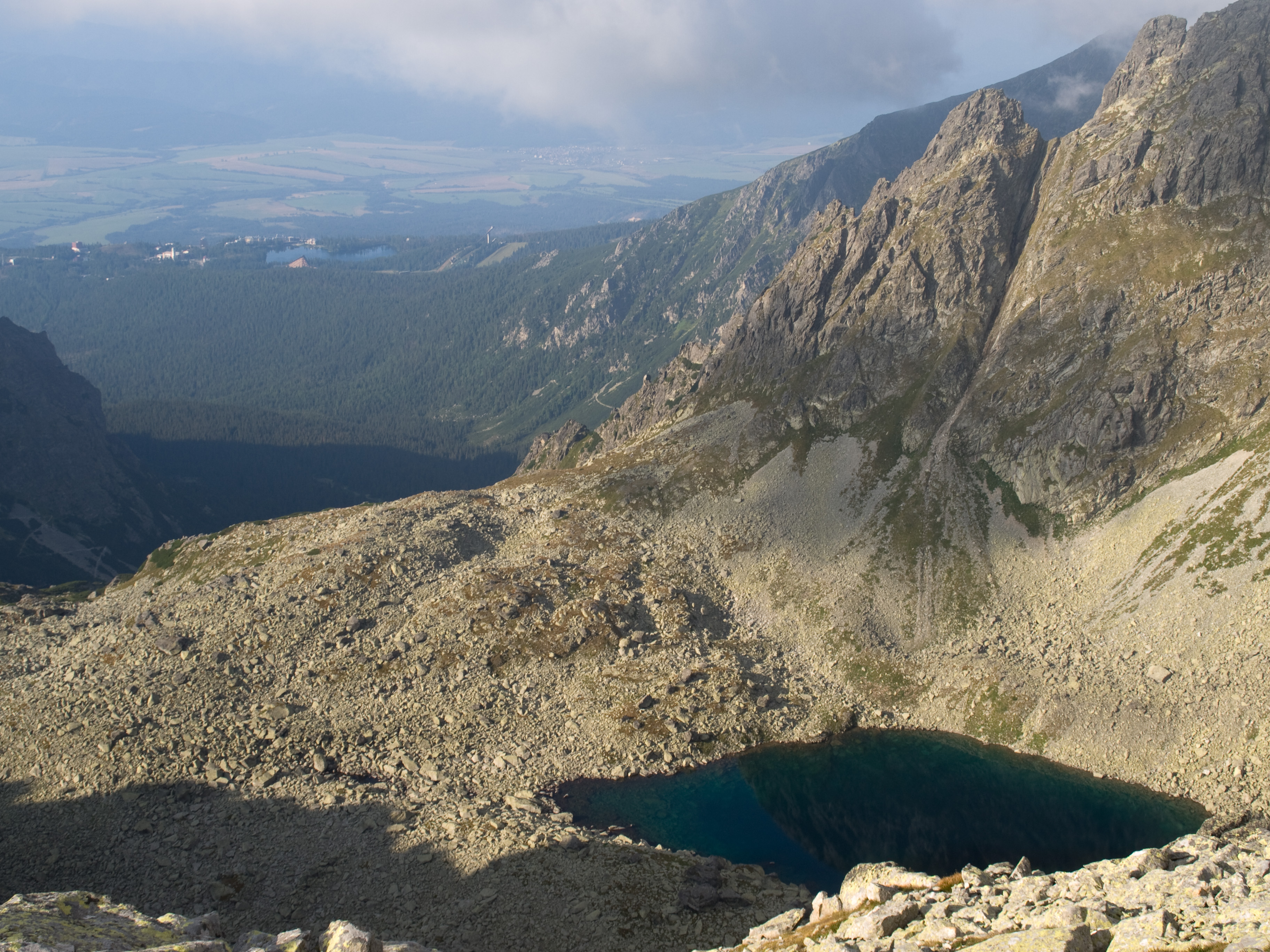
Dračie pleso

The Tatra lakes comprise approximately 200 bodies of water, excluding smaller and seasonal lakes, located within the Tatra Mountains. Of these, around 40 lakes are situated in the Polish Tatras, while the remainder are found on the Slovak side of the range. They are known for their clear waters and scenic surroundings, making them popular destinations for outdoor activities such as hiking and photography.

In local vernacular, these lakes are traditionally referred to as "ponds", a term that is also reflected in various forms of literature, including scientific studies. The Tatra lakes play an important ecological role, supporting a range of flora and fauna, some of which are unique to the region. They contribute significantly to the natural heritage of the Tatra Mountains, attracting visitors interested in both recreation and nature conservation.

== Origins ==
Most of the ponds are located at elevations above 1,600 meters, primarily in the High Tatras, which is closely related to their origin. They are mainly of glacial origin, as glaciers significantly reshaped the landscape in the High Tatras, much more so than in the Western Tatras. These are mostly tarns, filling cirques, such as Czarny Staw pod Rysami or Okrúhle pleso. Moraine-dammed lakes tend to be smaller and shallower. They formed in depressions dammed by lateral moraines (Smreczyński Staw) or terminal moraines (Toporowy Staw Niżni). Morskie Oko and Czarny Staw Gąsienicowy are cirque-moraine lakes, located in deepened glacial valleys, closed by rock thresholds upon which terminal moraine ridges settled. There are also kettle lakes that fill depressions left by so-called dead ice blocks. An example is the large Štrbské pleso or the small Kotlinowy Stawek. Smaller ponds, like Dwoisty Staw Gąsienicowy or Anitino očko, fill depressions between piles of boulders and scree, and their origins are often mixed. Pośrednie Stawy Rohackie, Wyżnie Mnichowe Stawki, and Zamrznuté oká fill hollows of roche moutonnée troughs carved by glaciers.

There are a few small water bodies of different origins. These include karst lakes filling sinkholes (Tiché pleso, Mokra Jama), overflow ponds (e.g., Rybie Stawki in the expansions of Rybi Potok), and ponds in ridge hollows (e.g., a pond on the Kasne pass). Additionally, there are about a dozen artificial lakes created by humans. Among these are Nové Štrbské pleso, Nowe Morskie Oko near Palenica Białczańska, and water reservoirs on Bystra Woda (below Nosal and in Kuźnice).

== Classification of lakes ==
The Tatra lakes have historically been classified based on thermal characteristics and, more recently, based on ice cover duration and morphometric features. Józef Szaflarski classified the Tatra lakes into 7 groups:

- large submontane reservoirs (up to 1,400 meters above sea level) with surfaces free of ice for at least 6 months a year, characterized by low transparency;
- shallow ponds and marshes (from 1,400 to 1,450 meters above sea level) characterized by significant temperature fluctuations in summer (from 4°C to 22°C);
- shallow ponds at between 1,450 and 1,700 meters above sea level with considerable temperature fluctuations in summer (from 4°C to 17°C);
- deep lakes at between 1,500 and 1,800 meters above sea level whose surfaces are ice-free for 3 to 5 months, with summer temperatures of between 8°C and 14°C;
- shallow lakes at between 1,700 and 1,900 meters above sea level with summer temperatures of between 8°C and 14°C;
- high altitude cold lakes (from 1,800 to 2,000 meters above sea level) whose surfaces are ice-free for less than 3 months, with summer temperatures below 8°C;
- frozen lakes located at between 2,050 and 2,180 meters above sea level, with summer temperatures not exceeding 5°C, and surfaces rarely free of ice; in some years, they remain covered with ice all year round.

=== Classification based on Ice Cover Duration (2020) ===
A more recent classification of Tatra lakes, encompassing 50 bodies of water with an area greater than 1 hectare, was developed using the Wrocław taxonomy method. This classification objectively grouped lakes into internally homogenous classes based on six features: altitude, volume, potential incoming solar radiation (PISR), and the number of days with ice cover over three subsequent seasons (2014/2015, 2015/2016, and 2016/2017).

Based on the study, the 50 largest lakes were divided into seven resulting groups:

- small and shaded lakes of the alpine and subnival zones. This group is situated at altitudes between 2040 and 2057 m asl and is characterized by the longest duration of ice cover (average of 209 days) and the smallest average potential solar radiation.
- small and medium-sized lakes in the upper subalpine, alpine, and subnival zones. These lakes are typically located on the southern side of the main ridge. They have a long ice cover duration, which was about 16 days shorter on average than that of Class 1 lakes in the study seasons.
- small and medium-sized, insolated lakes situated in the upper part of the subalpine zone and the lower part of the alpine zone. This group is distinguished by the highest insolation and a very homogeneous ice cover duration, which was 22 days shorter on average than Class 2 lakes.
- medium-large, insolated lakes situated in the upper section of the subalpine zone and in the lower section of the alpine zone. These are much larger than Class 3 lakes in terms of area and volume, with an ice cover duration fluctuating between 162 and 174 days.
- small lakes in the area of the upper tree line and in the lower part of the subalpine zone. These lakes are situated at relatively low altitudes (1546 m to 1751 m asl), are generally small and shallow, and are characterized by high average monthly potential insolation.
- lakes not similar to each other (14 single-item sets). These lakes show some similarity to groups 2-5, but their individual characteristics mean they do not fit cleanly into a homogenous class.
- large lakes (>10 ha). This group includes all lakes with a surface area exceeding 10 ha (8 lakes in total). The predominant feature of these unclassified lakes is their large volume, which typically leads to a shorter duration of their ice cover. The largest lakes, such as Wielki Staw Polski and Morskie Oko, fall into this category.

== Characteristics ==
Tatra lakes are surface-fed by rain and meltwater, streams, and underground springs. The water levels in the ponds are generally stable, with the surface level fluctuating by only a few dozen centimeters. The highest levels occur during spring thaws, while the lowest levels are observed in autumn and winter. Water levels also rise after heavy rainfall, typically with a one-day delay. Some ponds give rise to streams, such as Czarny Potok Gąsienicowy, which flows out of Czarny Staw Gąsienicowy, and Žabí potok, which originates from Malé Žabie pleso Mengusovské. Some ponds, like Siwe Stawki or Dolné Bystré pleso, are seasonal and often dry up during the summer months.

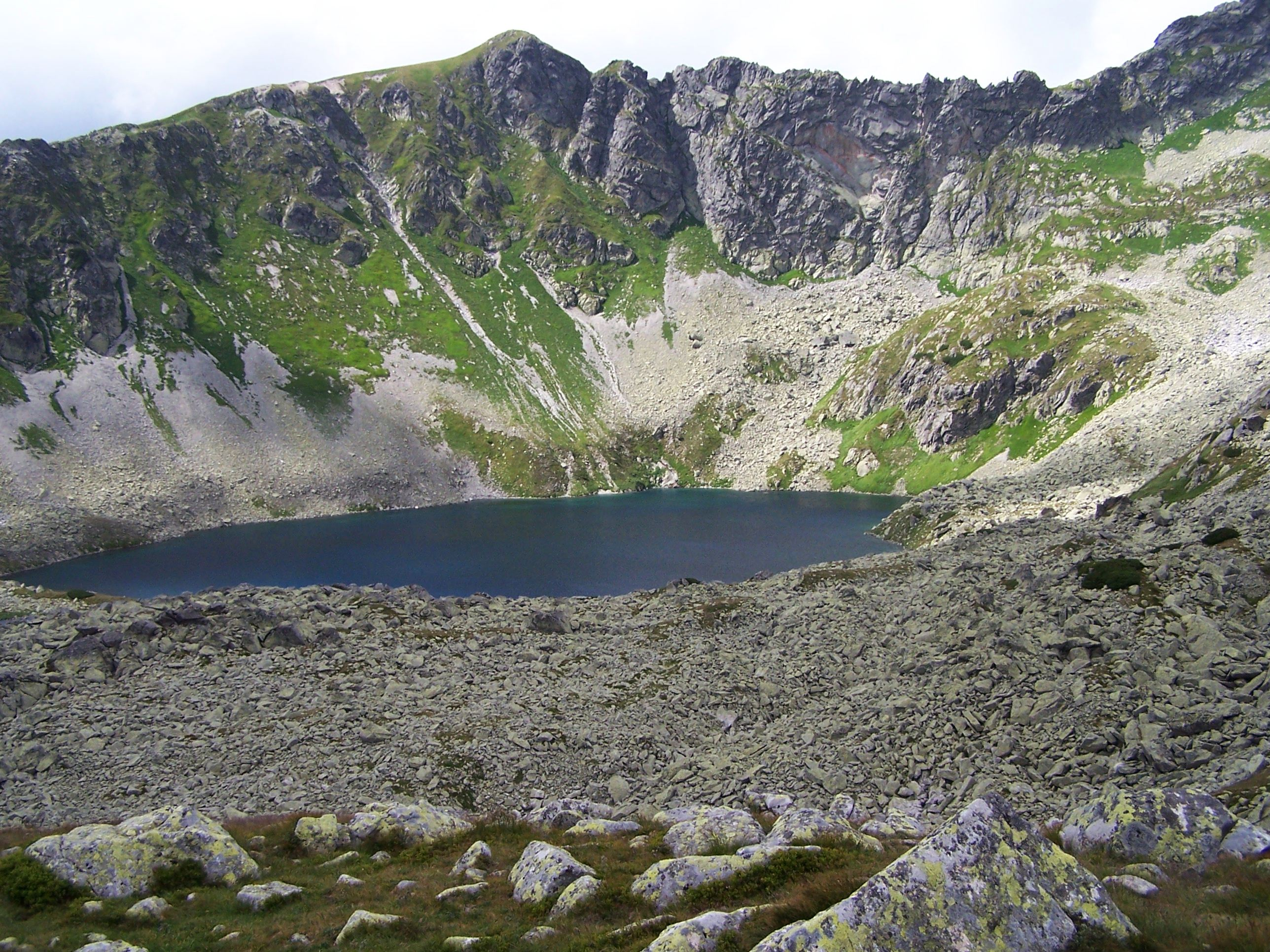
Zadni Staw Polski

Most of the Tatra lakes are characterized by very high transparency. The highest transparency (measured by the visibility of a submerged white disk) is found in high-altitude tarns. Record transparency has been recorded in Veľké Hincovo pleso (19 meters), in Czarny Staw pod Rysami (from 16.5 to 17.5 meters), and in Morskie Oko (12 meters). Such high transparency is related to the very low organic life in these lakes, the absence of plankton, and the minimal presence of suspended particles. The littoral zone is either absent or poorly developed. The bottom sediments are highly mineralized and low in organic compounds, particularly nitrogen compounds. This is also one of the reasons for the low abundance of plankton in these lakes. The water in these lakes is cold and highly oxygenated, and they are classified as extremely oligotrophic. Lower-altitude moraine ponds, like Smreczyński Staw and Toporowe Stawy, which have richer organic life, are much less transparent (around 2 meters). High-altitude, deep, and nutrient-poor Tatra lakes, when viewed from a distance, appear sapphire blue. Slightly lower lakes, such as Morskie Oko, appear blue with an emerald hue, while Smreczyński Staw has a brownish color. However, these colors are observed only in the shallower water layers; in deep lakes, the water appears black due to the absorption and scattering of light, which prevents it from penetrating to great depths. When observing a lake from above, different shades can be seen depending on the depth of the bottom. Czerwony Staw Pańszczycki owes its color to the cyanobacteria Pleurocapsa aurantica, which stains the stones on the lakebed a reddish-brown color.

Temperature measurements in the ponds show the existence of distinct water layers with a sharp temperature drop, known as a thermocline. The living conditions for aquatic organisms significantly depend on their location relative to the thermocline. The formation of a thermocline is related to the great depth of the lakes and the high mountain walls, which provide protection from the wind that stirs up waves. A measurement conducted on 2 August 1937 at Morskie Oko revealed that the well-mixed upper water layer, stirred by waves, was only 3 meters thick with a temperature of 12.1°C. From the surface to a depth of 10 meters, the temperature dropped by almost 1°C per meter; between 10 and 20 meters, it decreased much more slowly (around 0.25°C per meter). Below 20 meters, all the way to the bottom, the temperature remained constant at around 4°C. Surface water temperatures in the summer fluctuate differently in various ponds. For example, in Niżni Staw Toporowy, they range from 10.5°C to 21.5°C, in Morskie Oko from 9.4°C to 21.5°C, and in Czarny Staw pod Rysami from 7°C to 11.5°C.

== Morphometric features ==
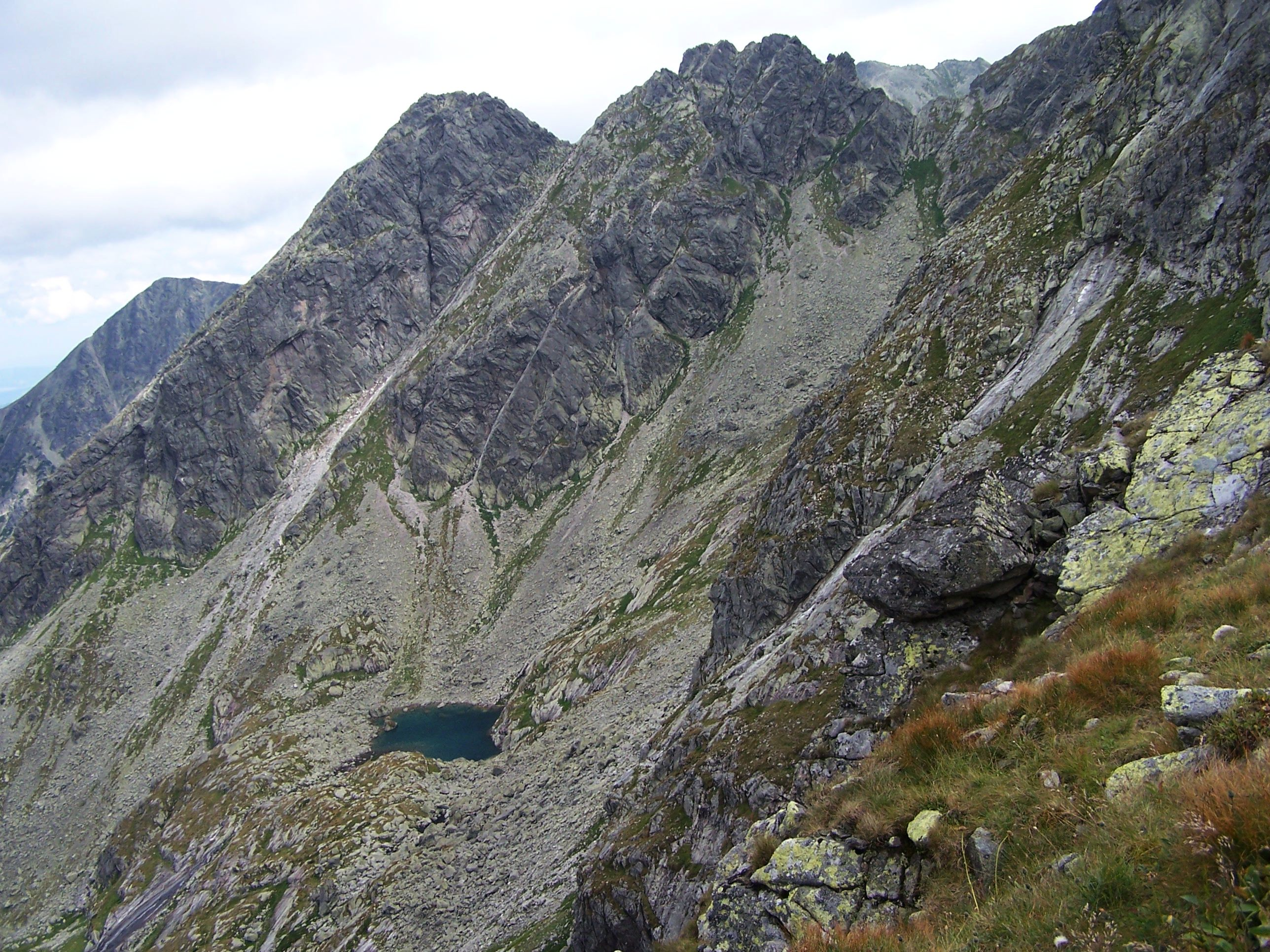
Zadni Staw Gąsienicowy at the Kościelec mountain

Among the permanent ponds, the lowest one is Pleso pod Zverovkou, while the highest is Modré pleso, both located in the Slovak Tatra Mountains. Some experts believe that the small permanent water bodies known as Batizovské oká situated above 2,200 meters, should hold the record, but they are often omitted from most maps. In the Polish Tatra Mountains, the lowest lake is Toporowy Staw Niżni (1,089 m), and the highest is Zadni Mnichowy Stawek (2,070 m).

Compared to the lowland lakes of Poland, Tatra lakes have a small surface area, but some of them are remarkably deep, which is rare among lowland lakes. The largest lakes by surface area are located on the Polish side of the Tatras: Morskie Oko and Wielki Staw Polski. Depending on the measurement, one or the other of these lakes may hold the surface area record. The third-largest by surface area is Czarny Staw pod Rysami. The deepest lake in the Tatras is Wielki Staw Polski (79.3 meters), which is also the third-deepest lake in Poland. Across the entire Tatra range, 8 lakes have a surface area of more than 10 hectares (5 of which are in the Polish Tatras), while 49 lakes are larger than 1 hectare, with 11 of these located in the Polish Tatras. The largest group of lakes is the Plesá Veľkej Studenej doliny, with 27 lakes in a single valley.

Tatra lakes generally have a rounded shape, with short shorelines, and deeply indented bays are rare. Small islands are found in only a few lakes. These islands formed from masses of scree that slid into the lake (e.g., Zmrzlé pleso, Vyšné Žabie pleso Bialčanské) or are roche moutonnées (rock outcrops) surrounded by water (e.g., Czarny Staw Gąsienicowy, Kurtkowiec). Kurtkowiec contains Poland's highest island (1,689 m). Typically, the shores of the lakes are steep and descend quickly into the depths. The bottoms of larger lakes are usually flat (e.g., in Wielki Staw Polski, 14.4% of the lake bottom is below 70 meters) and muddy; larger boulders are generally found near the rocky walls. The shape, surface area, and depth of the lakes are continuously changing, as these bodies of water are being filled with scree from the steep slopes and sediments carried by streams flowing into them. Some lakes have already disappeared entirely, such as Lejkowy Staw. The current Wielka Polana Małołącka was once a large lake, which gradually filled with rock debris from the surrounding slopes. Lower-altitude ponds are shrinking due to progressive peat formation.

== Largest lakes in the Tatra Mountains ==
Lake name	Elevation (meters above sea level)	Area (hectares)	Maximum depth (meters)	Volume (cubic meters)
Morskie Oko	1,392.8	34.54	50.8	9,935,000
Wielki Staw Polski	1,664.6	34.14	79.3	12,967,000
Czarny Staw pod Rysami	1,579.5	20.54	76.4	7,761,700
Veľké Hincovo pleso	1,944.8	20.08	54.0	4,091,712
Štrbské pleso	1,346.6	19.67	20.3	1,299,400
Czarny Staw Gąsienicowy	1,619.6	17.79	51.0	3,797,800
Czarny Staw Polski	1,722.1	12.65	50.4	2,825,800
Nižné Temnosmrečinské pleso	1,677.0	11.70	38.1	1,501,500
Vyšné Žabie pleso Bialčanské	1,699.1	9.46	24.8	839,413
Przedni Staw Polski	1,668.3	7.72	34.6	1,130,000
Popradské pleso	1,494.3	6.87	17.6	504,380
Zadni Staw Polski	1,889.6	6.46	31.6	918,400
Vyšné Temnosmrečinské pleso	1,724.8	5.56	20.0	414,712
Nižné Terianske pleso	1,940.4	5.56	47.3	871,668
Vyšné Wahlenbergovo pleso	2,157.0	5.17	20.6	392,078
Zelené pleso Krivánske	2,012.5	5.14	29.5	288,685
Nižné Žabie pleso Bialčanské	1,674.6	4.68	20.5	325,244
Zielony Staw Gąsienicowy	1,671.7	3.84	15.1	260,500
Batizovské pleso	1,884.2	3.48	10.5	232,089
Capie pleso	2,075.3	3.06	17.5	163,987

This list includes the 20 largest lakes in the Tatra Mountains by surface area. The data is based on measurements conducted by the Polish Military Geographical Institute in 1934 and by the Slovak Academy of Sciences and the Slovak University of Technology in Bratislava from the 1960s, with updates in subsequent years. Polish measurements reflect conditions on the day of measurement, while Slovak data corresponds to high water levels.

== Ice cover ==
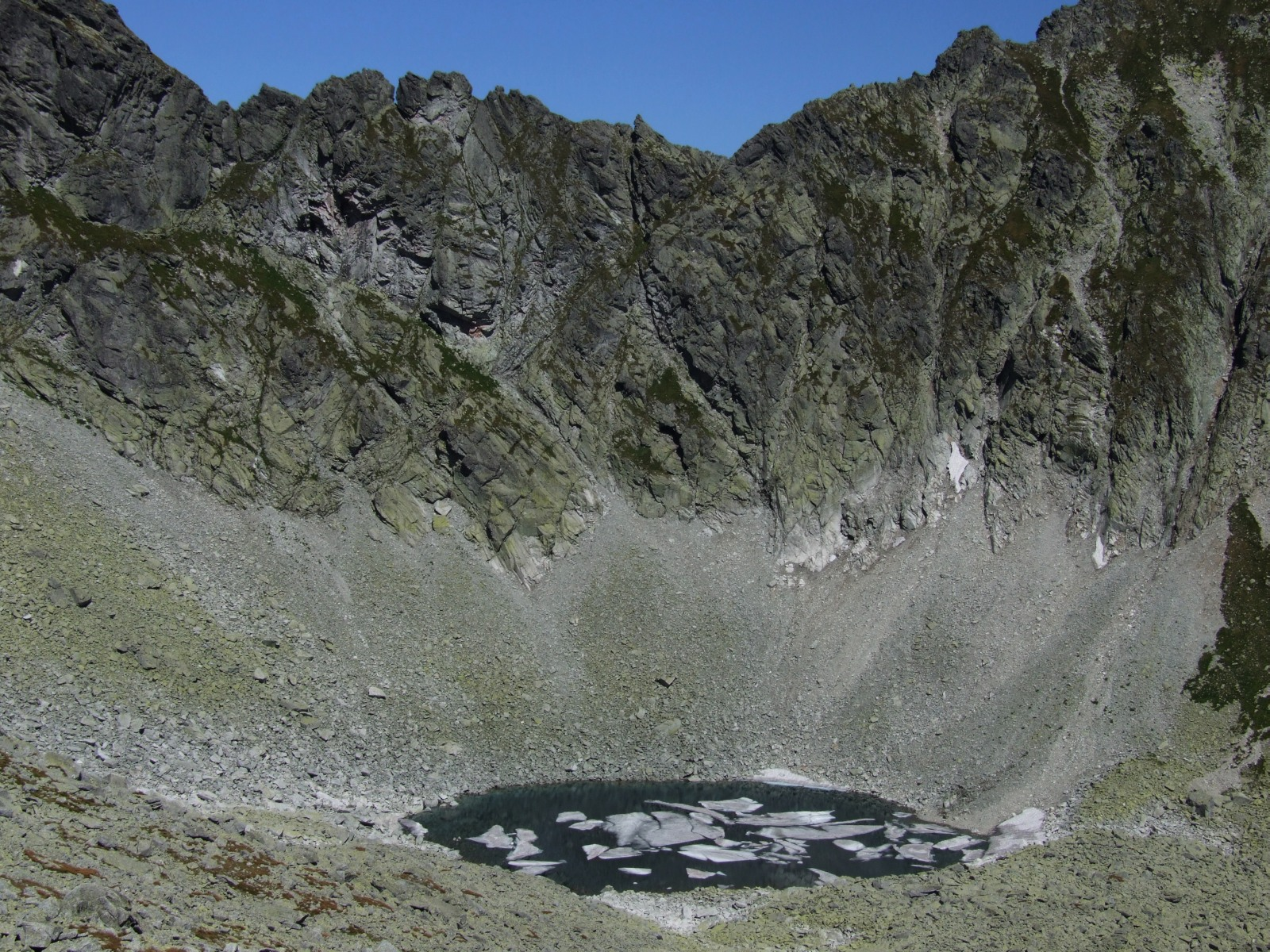
Okrúhle pleso with ice floe

The duration of ice cover on Tatra lakes depends on their elevation, size, shading, and exposure. Generally, the higher the elevation, the longer the lakes remain frozen. Some of the highest lakes, known as frozen ponds (like Modré pleso), may remain frozen year-round or thaw for only a brief period.

Lakes that are not shaded and located on the southern slopes of the Tatras tend to thaw earlier. For example, Morskie Oko usually freezes in November and thaws between May and July, while Zadni Staw Gąsienicowy freezes between September and October and thaws between June and August. The thawing process itself can take weeks; for instance, Zadni Staw Gąsienicowy, despite being small, takes from 5 to 9 weeks to completely thaw due to its high elevation. In contrast, Toporowy Staw Wyżni, located at a lower altitude, can thaw in just between 2 and 3 weeks. During the thawing process, the surface water temperature remains close to 0. High-altitude lakes in the Tatras are also characterized by very thick ice cover during winter. By the end of winter, ice thickness can range from 150 to 375 cm, with the thickest recorded ice cover of 3.75 meters observed on Zadni Staw Polski in the Valley of Five Polish Ponds. The thickness of the ice and the duration of ice cover can vary greatly from year to year. For example, during the winter of 1950/1951, Morskie Oko did not freeze until January but had already thawed by March.

The structure of winter ice on Tatra lakes resembles that of Alpine lakes. The top layer consists of dry snow, beneath which lies a layer of wet snow and ice, sometimes interspersed with multiple layers of wet snow and ice. This layered structure occurs because the heavy snow from the frequent Tatra snowfalls presses down on the lake’s ice cover, causing it to submerge slightly. Water seeps through cracks in the ice, saturating the snow until an equilibrium is reached between the weight of the displaced water and the weight of the snow.

== Flora and fauna ==
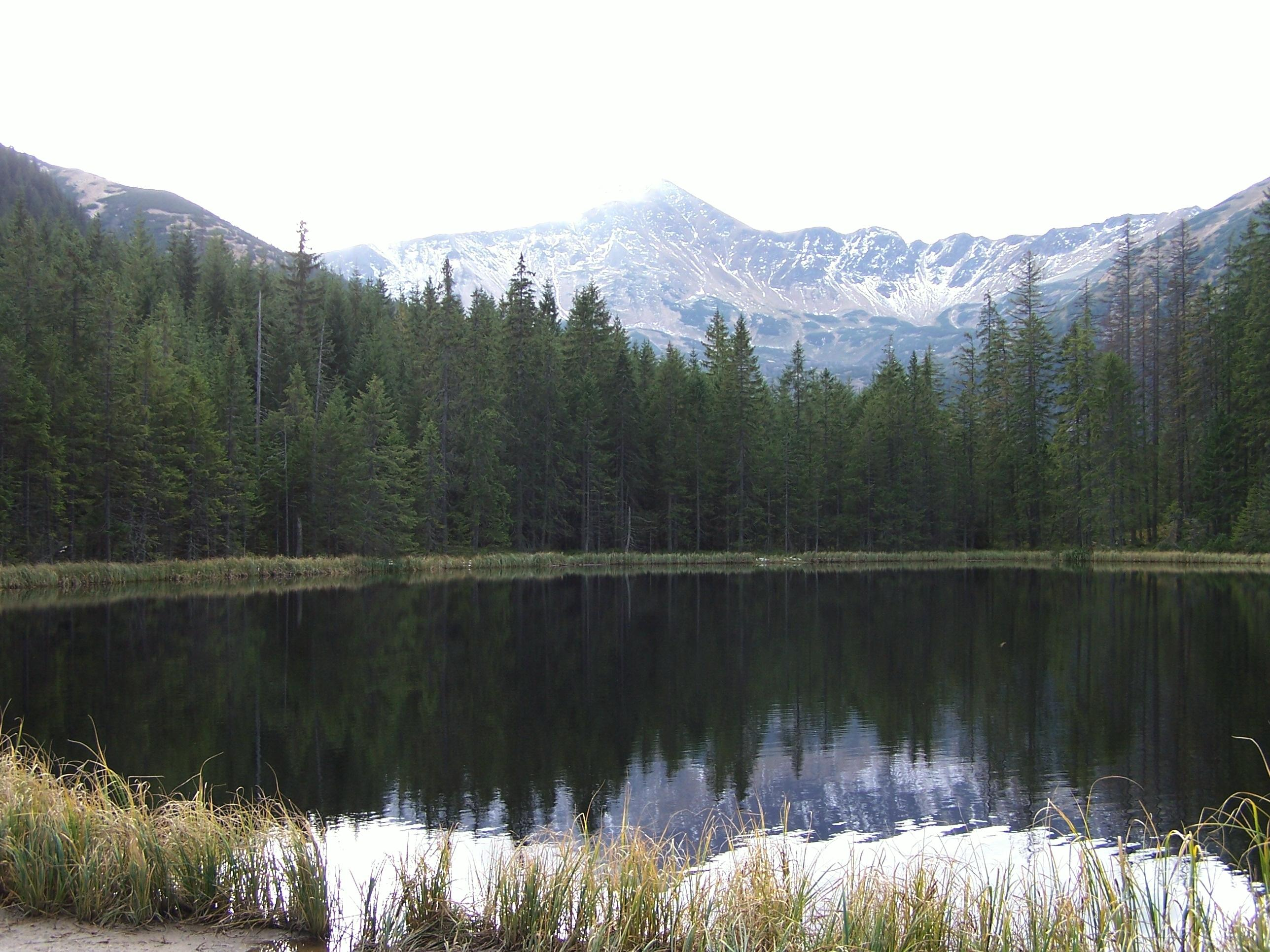
Smreczyński Staw, a lake with relatively abundant organic life

Shoreline vegetation occurs only in the lower-lying lakes. The lowest lakes and the few foothill lakes contain a lot of humic substances, few mineral salts, are acidic, and are classified as dystrophic lakes. Higher elevation lakes are poor in flora and fauna in terms of biomass, but they exhibit relatively high species diversity. Numerous rotifers, Turbellaria, protozoa, several species of mollusks, and crustaceans are found here. Frogs and newts occur in the lower-lying lakes. Among the invertebrates not found in lowland regions, four species of copepods and 16 species of Turbellaria live in the Tatra lakes.

Fish naturally occurred in only a few lakes, including Morskie Oko and Popradzki Staw. However, some lakes have been artificially stocked, mainly with river trout. The presence of fish affects the overall biodiversity of zooplankton. In fishless lakes, zooplankton is dominated by a single filter feeding species. In Czarny Staw pod Rysami, this is Daphnia pulicaria, while in stocked lakes, species that are harder for fish to catch but have weaker competitive abilities coexist, resulting in more species diversity. The duration of fish populations also affects the behavior of planktonic animals. In fishless lakes, they concentrate in the photic zone, where they feed on phytoplankton and other animals. In lakes where fish have been present for at least several hundred years, they perform large diel vertical migrations, while in lakes stocked only in the last few decades, the vertical migrations are of smaller amplitude. This suggests that under the influence of fish that prey on plankton, zooplankton perform larger vertical migrations, but the process of adapting to the presence of predatory fish takes a long time. In the first few decades after fish appear, these migrations do not reach their maximum amplitude.

== History of scientific research ==
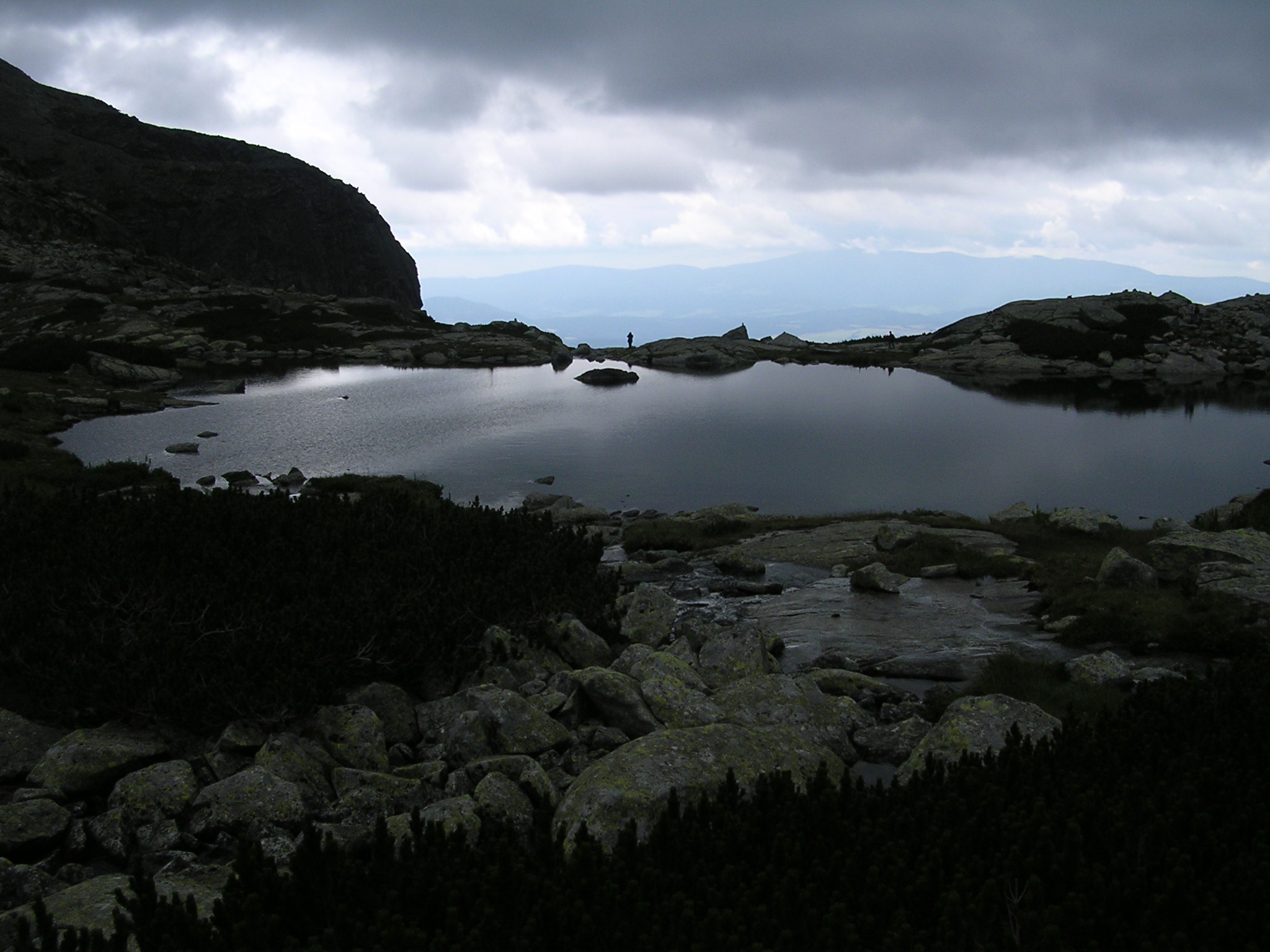
Pleso nad Skokom

The first limnological research in the Tatra Mountains was conducted in 1751 by Jakob Buchholtz, who measured water levels in the Nižné Temnosmrečinské pleso continuously for a full day. His measurements showed no inflows or outflows, debunking the then-common belief that Tatra lakes were connected to the sea. In 1806, Stanisław Staszic measured the depth of Czarny Staw pod Rysami, but his result (190 meters) significantly deviated from modern measurements.

In 1849, Ludwik Zejszner provided a more reliable depth measurement of Morskie Oko (49 meters). In 1875, Dezső Dénes measured the depth and surface area of Štrbské pleso and Popradské pleso. A little later, Eugeniusz Klemens Dziewulski studied 8 lakes on the Polish (then Galician) side of the Tatras. His research results included the water level, its temperature and color, shoreline plans, and the lake bottom's topography. The first water temperature measurements at various depths were conducted by Leopold Świerz in 1876 (he continued these in later years), while between 1890 and 1893, Ludwik Birkenmajer carried out systematic research on the thermal conditions of Tatra lakes in different seasons (about 1,600 measurements). By the late 19th century, interest in lake flora and fauna had also begun. Leading zoological research at the time was Antoni Wierzejski, who discovered several new species of copepods in Tatra lakes, and in 1882, he found the fairy shrimp Branchinecta paludosa in Dwoisty Staw Gąsienicowy. In the same year, the first chemical analysis of water composition was conducted by Karol Olszewski. In 1909, Ludomir Sawicki, together with Stanisław Minkiewicz, studied 15 lakes on both sides of the Tatras in detail (including measurements, thermal profiles, water transparency, and color) and collected samples for biological research. An outstanding limnologist of the Tatras during this period was Alfred Lityński, whose research covered topics such as fauna, water thermics, ice cover duration, and ice structure.

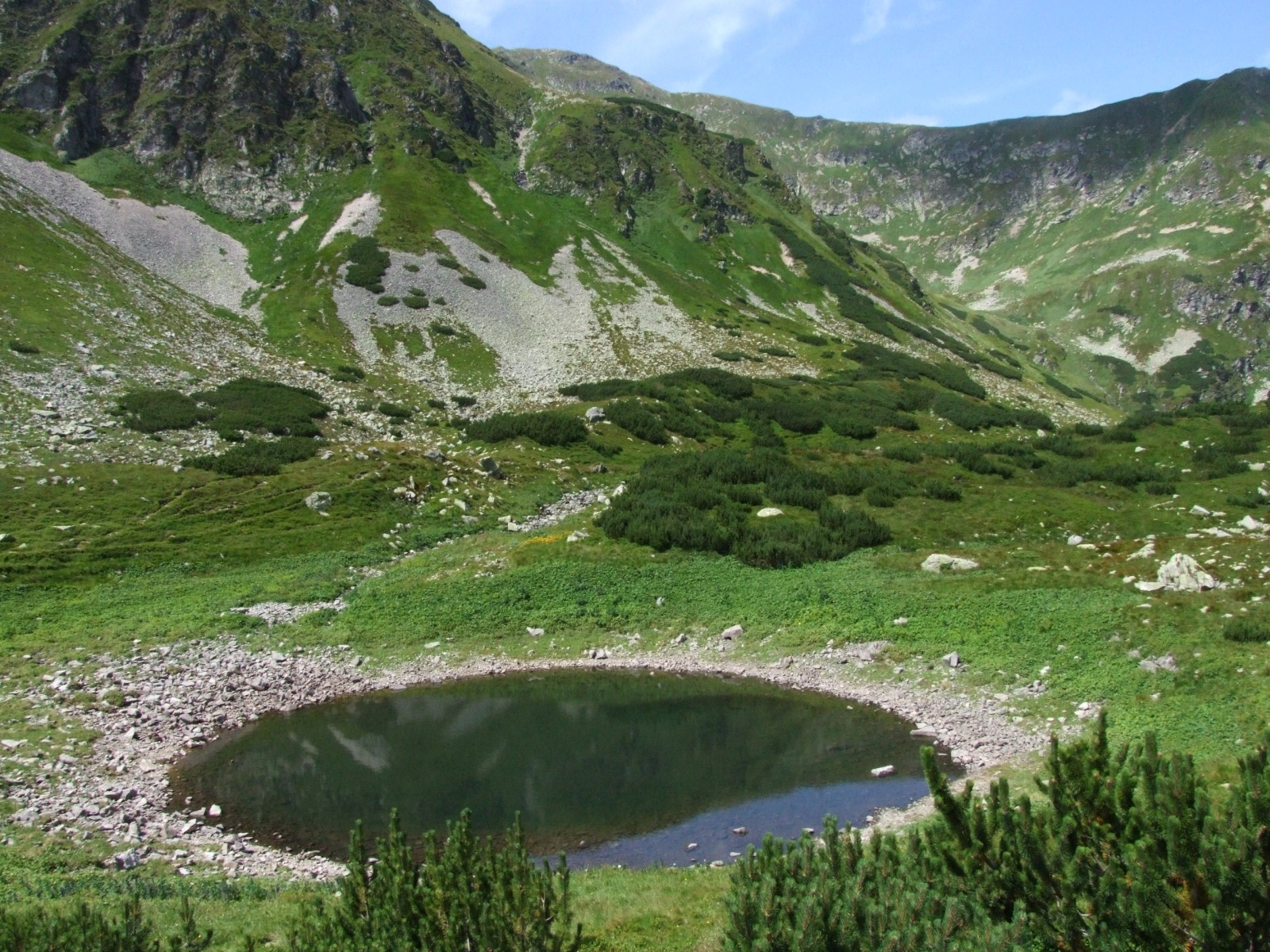
Račkove plesá

During the interwar period, many researchers became involved in measuring and mapping the lakes. Józef Szaflarski was the most active, publishing numerous scientific papers related to Tatra lakes, and his measurements covered a large number of lakes on the southern side of the ridge as well. Jerzy Młodziejowski was the first to take a closer interest in the lakes of the Western Tatras (Jamnickie Stawy, Bystre Stawy, and Siwe Stawki). In the spring of 1934, all the named permanent lakes of the Polish Tatras (40 in total) were thoroughly surveyed by the Military Geographical Institute. The results of these surveys remain official and are the most commonly referenced to this day. In the Slovak part of the Tatras, most of the water bodies were measured by employees of Tatra National Park, Slovak Academy of Sciences, and Slovak University of Technology in Bratislava between 1961 and 1964 (mapping) and later (supplementing bathymetry, hydrological studies, and determining the altitude of the water surface).

Since the 1960s, Tatra lakes have been studied by scientists from the Institute of Water Biology at the Polish Academy of Sciences. In the 1990s, research was also conducted with the participation of scuba divers. At the end of the 20th century, the fauna of Tatra lakes became the subject of research by the Department of Hydrobiology at the University of Warsaw. Comparing the conditions in fishless lakes, lakes with long-established fish populations, and recently stocked lakes allowed for the verification of several ecological hypotheses regarding the impact of predation pressure on zooplankton populations, including the competitive exclusion principle, diel vertical migrations, pigmentation, and more.

== Tatra lakes in art and literature ==
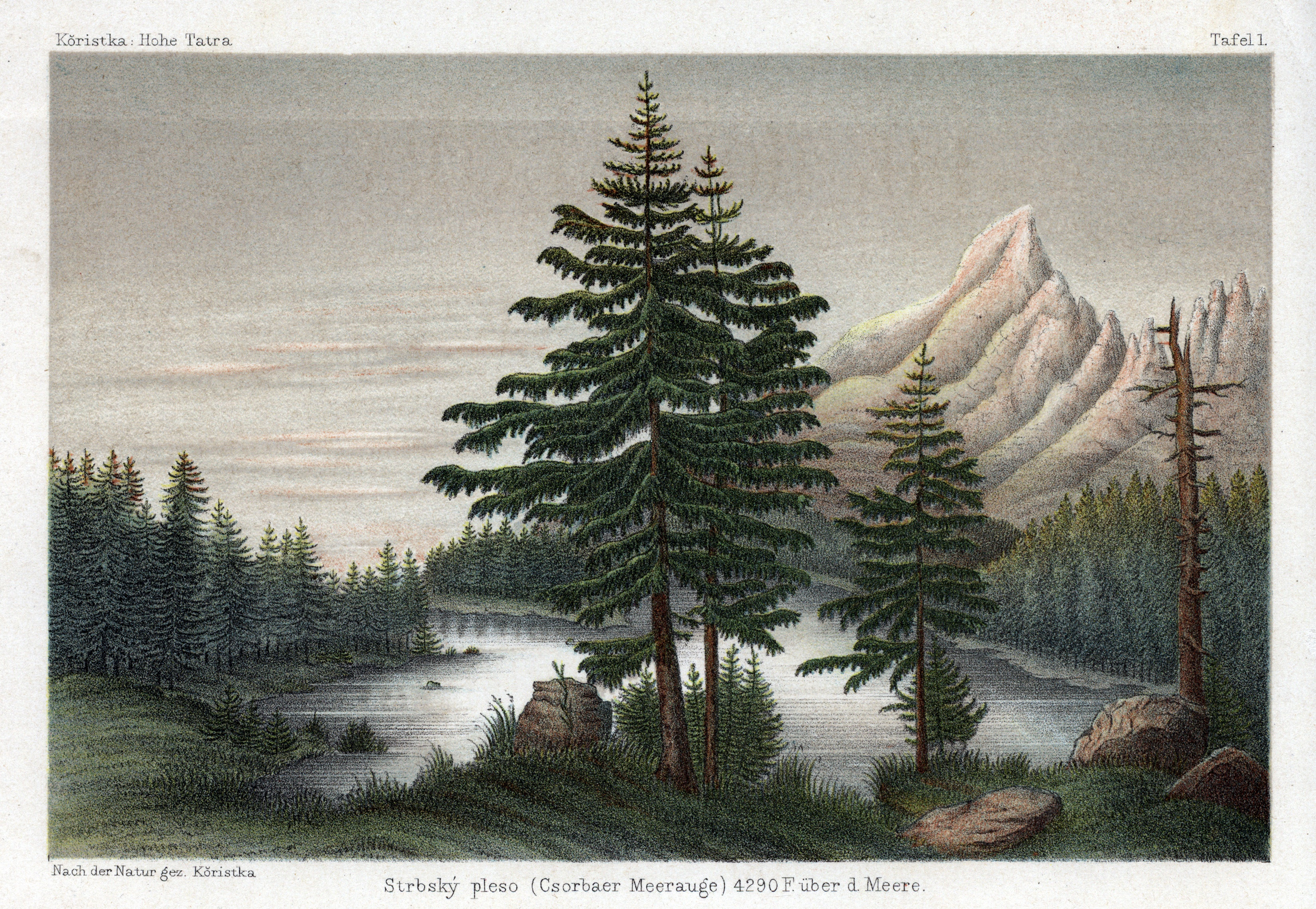
Štrbské pleso, painting from 1865

As Tatra tourism became popular among the intellectual elite, Tatra lakes inspired painters, poets, and writers. As early as 1825, Jakob Müller painted Štrbské pleso. Among Poles, the first to capture Morskie Oko in 1837 were Jan Nepomucen Głowacki and Adam Gorczyński. Others followed in their footsteps: Maciej Bogusz Stęczyński, Irena Zaborowska, Julia Stabrowska, Leon Wyczółkowski, Stanisław Witkiewicz, Stanisław Gałek, Zenon Pokrywczyński, and more, who created an entire series of paintings depicting the Tatra lakes. Artists from other countries also frequently painted them. Countless photographs and albums of Tatra lakes were also made.

Many legends about the Tatra lakes circulated among the local population. One of the most popular was the myth of Morskie Oko being connected to the sea (hence its name – Eye of the Sea). These legends were described by Kazimierz Przerwa-Tetmajer in his Bajeczny świat Tatr (The Fabulous World of the Tatras). Numerous poets also dedicated works to the Tatra lakes. The first was a poem by Józef Przerwa-Tetmajer in 1829, followed by Adam Asnyk, Franciszek Nowicki, Kazimierz Przerwa-Tetmajer, Jerzy Liebert, Leopold Lewin, and many others. Stefan Żeromski described Smreczyński Staw in the second volume of Popioły (The Ashes), and Seweryn Goszczyński in his work Oda (Ode).

== Threats ==
Tatra lakes, like the entire Tatra region, are threatened by the effects of mass tourism. Mountain huts located on their shores have often discharged municipal sewage into the lakes. Waste from a hotel laundry discharged into Popradzki Staw caused a change in the color of its water, and a 6-meter-high cone of hotel waste was discovered at the bottom of the lake. Nowadays, shelters usually have sewage treatment facilities, but tourists remain a threat by throwing large amounts of trash and coins into the lakes. The metals contained in them contaminate the clean water of these lakes. Every year, divers retrieve huge amounts of garbage from the lake bottoms: pots, cans, broken chairs and tables, skis, sleds, and even baby strollers.

The unauthorized stocking of some Tatra lakes with fish by unknown individuals was an ill-considered action with harmful effects on the natural fauna of these lakes. In the cold, oligotrophic Tatra lakes, the fauna of small animals that could serve as food for fish is very scarce. In some lakes, trout have completely died out; in others, a small population lingers, feeding on small invertebrates. The most significant damage was caused by stocking Dwoisty Staw Gąsienicowy. This lake was home to Branchinecta paludosa, a glacial relict crustacean, and it was the only habitat of this species in all of Poland. Most likely, fish stocking led to its extinction; in the small lake, trout eradicated the crustacean completely, and the fish themselves perished during the winter. Those responsible for the stocking did not consider that this lake loses water in winter. A thick layer of ice forms on its surface, blocking the water inflow, while the water beneath the ice drains away through underground channels.
