= Izra (lake) =

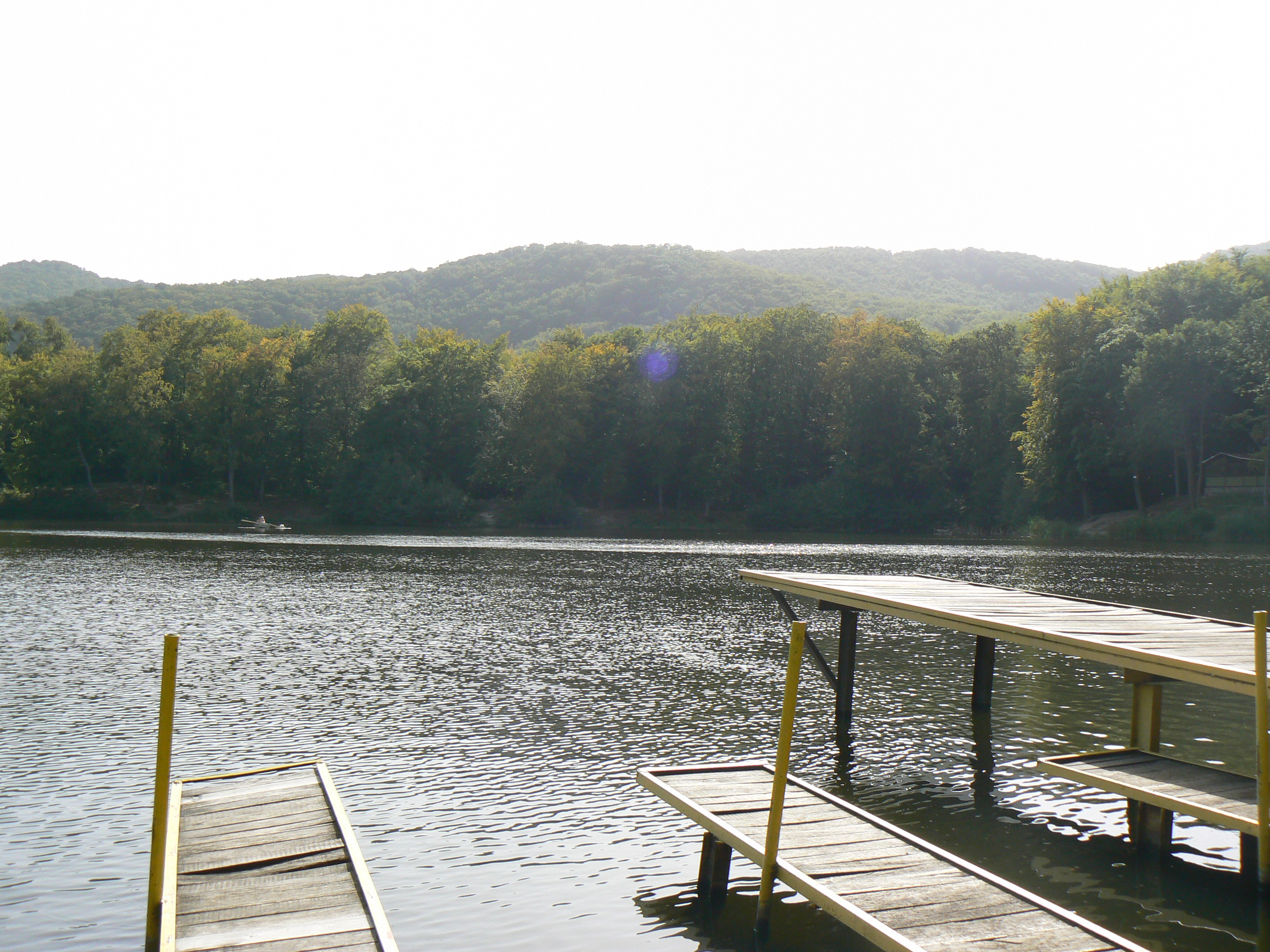

- Location within Slovakia
- Location: Slovakia
- Coordinates: 48°34′12″N 21°29′34″E
- Type: lake
- Max. length: 250 metres (820 ft)
- Max. width: 210 metres (690 ft)
- Surface area: 3.7 hectares (9.1 acres)

Izra is a lake of Slovakia. It covers an area of 3.7 hectares (9.1 acres) and is 250 metres (820 ft) long and 210 metres (690 ft) wide. Located near the village of Slanská Huta, the lake is a place for swimming, fishing and boating.

== See also ==
- List of lakes of Slovakia
