= Devínske =

- Location within Slovakia
- Location: Slovakia
- Coordinates: 48°16′30″N 16°57′03″E
- Type: lake

Devínske is a lake in the Bratislava Region of Slovakia.

== See also ==
- List of lakes of Slovakia
