= Váh Oxbow Lake (Komárno) =

Lake in Slovakia

- Mrtve rameno Váhu
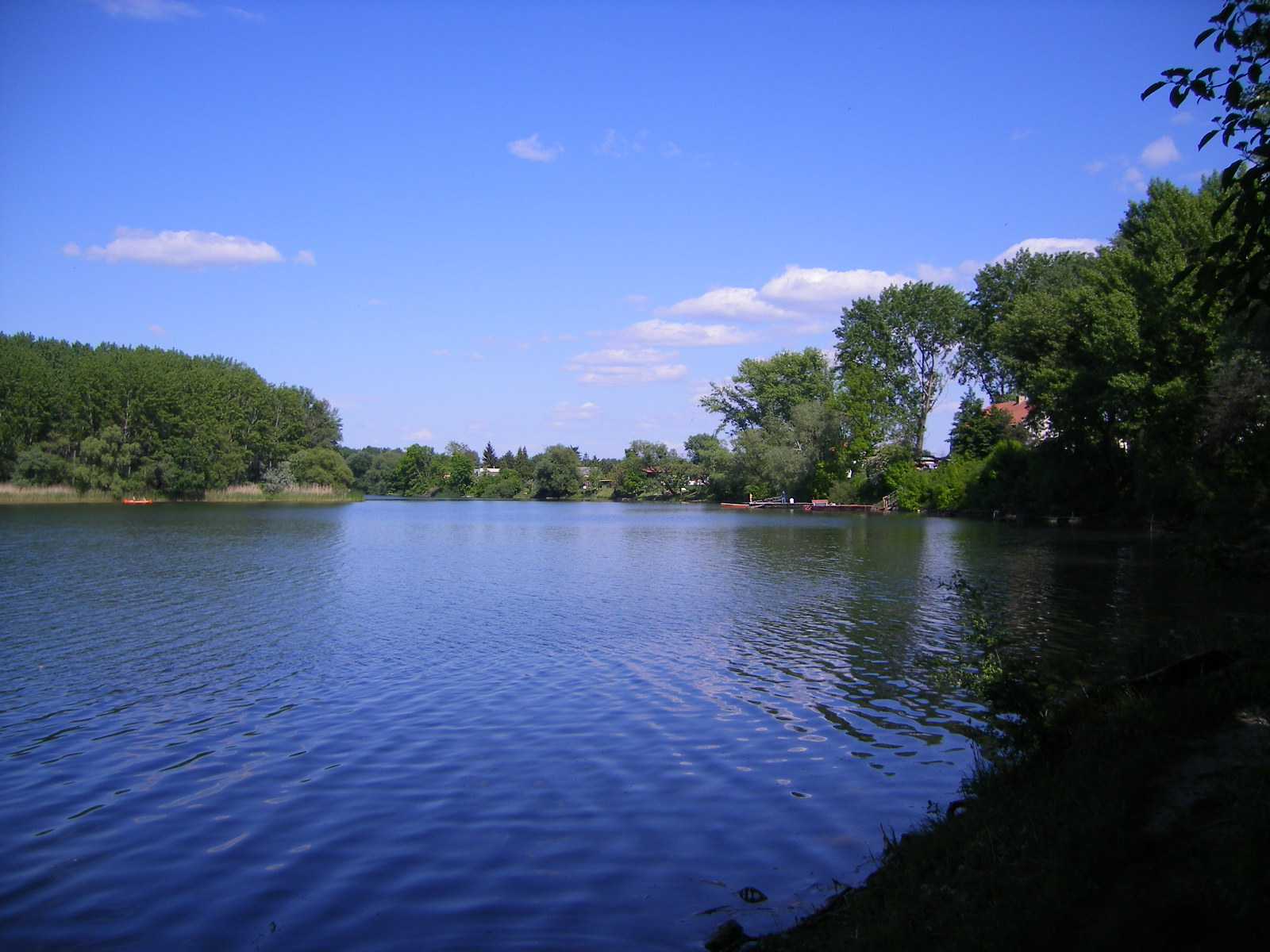
- Bank view of Váh Oxbow in Komárno
- Interactive map of Váh Oxbow Lake
- Location: Komárno Slovakia
- Coordinates: 47°46′54.8″N 18°7′26″E
- Part of: Váh
- Max. length: 1.47 km (0.91 mi)
- Surface area: 239 m^{2} (2,570 sq ft)
- Average depth: 4 m (13 ft)
- Max. depth: 6 m (20 ft)
- Surface elevation: 110 m (360 ft)
- Settlements: Komárno

The Váh Oxbow Lake (Slovak: Mŕtve rameno Váhu, Hungarian: Holtvág, colloquially also Mrtvák) is a body of water located north of Komárno, Slovakia. It was formed in 1973 by damming a branch of the Váh River, creating a separated oxbow lake.

A regulated dam controls the mouth of the Komárno Canal, and another dam at the outlet prevents direct swimming access to the Váh River.

== Usage and Environment ==
The lake and its surrounding island serve as a popular recreational area for residents of Komárno.

Facilities include:

- A boat rental service and public beach
- The Kormorán Komárno Tourist Club
- The Poseidon Komárno Diving Club
- Several restaurants and a cottage zone

The area is also home to nutria (Myocastor coypus), an invasive rodent species likely introduced from cage breeding.

The oxbow is bordered by Apáli Island, a designated National Nature Reserve, and is surrounded by wetlands and floodplain forests, contributing to its ecological significance

== See also ==
- List of lakes of Slovakia
