= Malé Morské oko =

Lake in Slovakia

- Malé Vihorlatské jazero
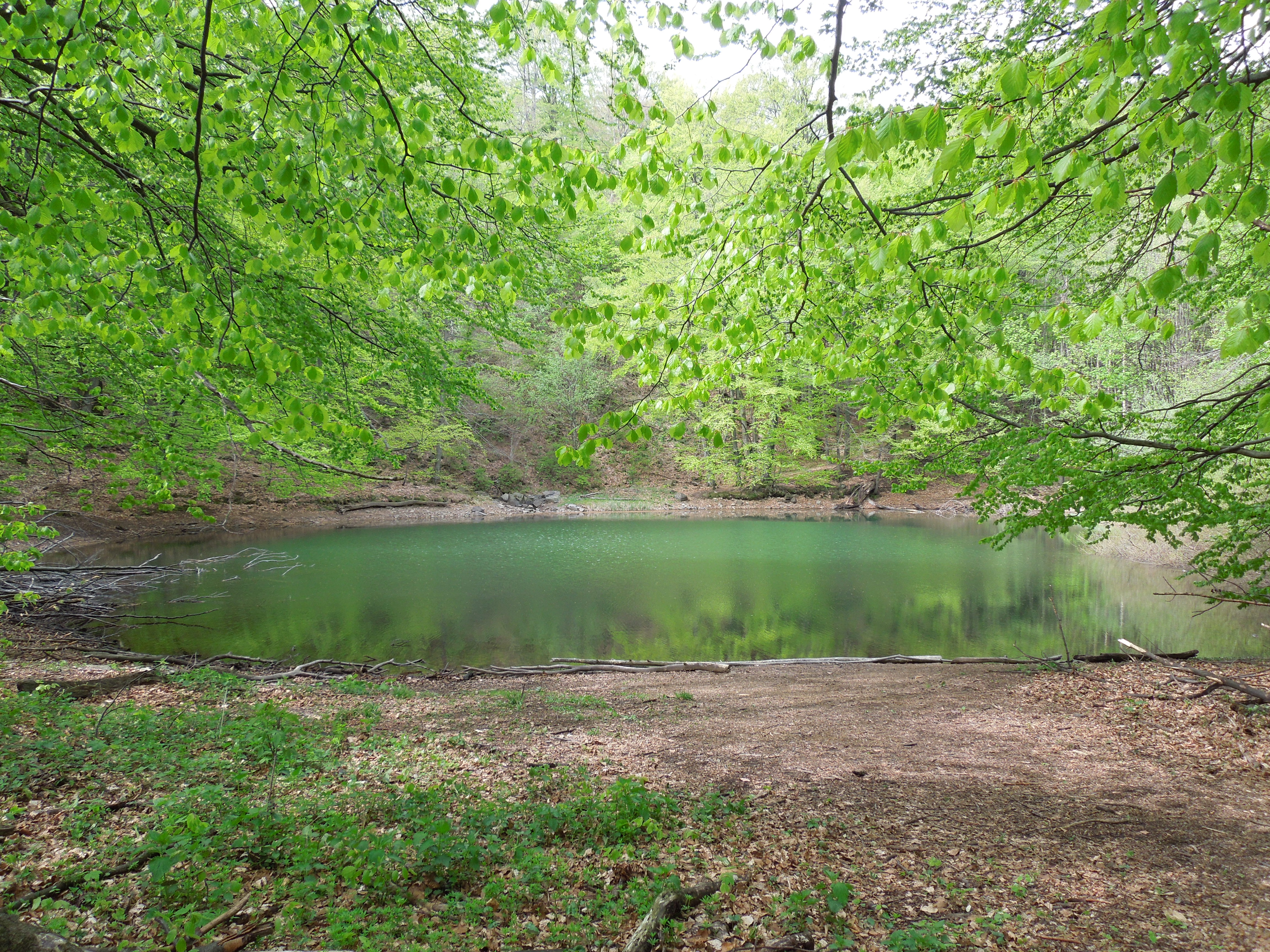
- Interactive map of Malé Morské oko
- Location: Remetské Hámre, Košice Region, Slovakia
- Coordinates: 48.91241°N 22.18312°E
- Type: Lake
- Part of: Ancient and Primeval Beech Forests of the Carpathians and Other Regions of Europe
- Surface area: 0.33 hectares (0.82 acres)
- Max. depth: 4 metres (13 ft)
- Surface elevation: 727 metres (2,385 ft)

Malé Morské oko (literally "Small eye of the sea"; formerly known as Malé Vihorlatské jazero) is a dammed lake in the Vihorlatské vrchy mountains. It was formed by landslide processes in an environment of volcanic rocks. It is the second most-preserved and second deepest lake in the Vihorlatské vrchy mountains. Malé Morské oko and its surroundings are a part of the UNESCO World Heritage Site.

Malé Morské Oko was formed in a small, basin-like depression under the Jedlinka hill, outside the main Okna valley, it remained unnoticed until 1993.

== Description ==
The lake is located at an altitude of 727 m above sea level west of Morské Oko in the Vihorlat protected landscape area. It covers an area of 0.33 ha and has a fluctuating water level (depth varies from 2.5 m–4 m). With a constant inflow of water, the lake has no surface outflow. Despite the small area of the lake, a large group of animals have found suitable living conditions here, including a large group of protected species, such as the variegated carp (Phoxinus phoxinus), crayfish (Astacus astacus) and a dwarf form of the crucian carp (Carassius carassius). Since 1993, it has been a natural monument together with its surroundings (Malé Morské Oko Nature Reserve).

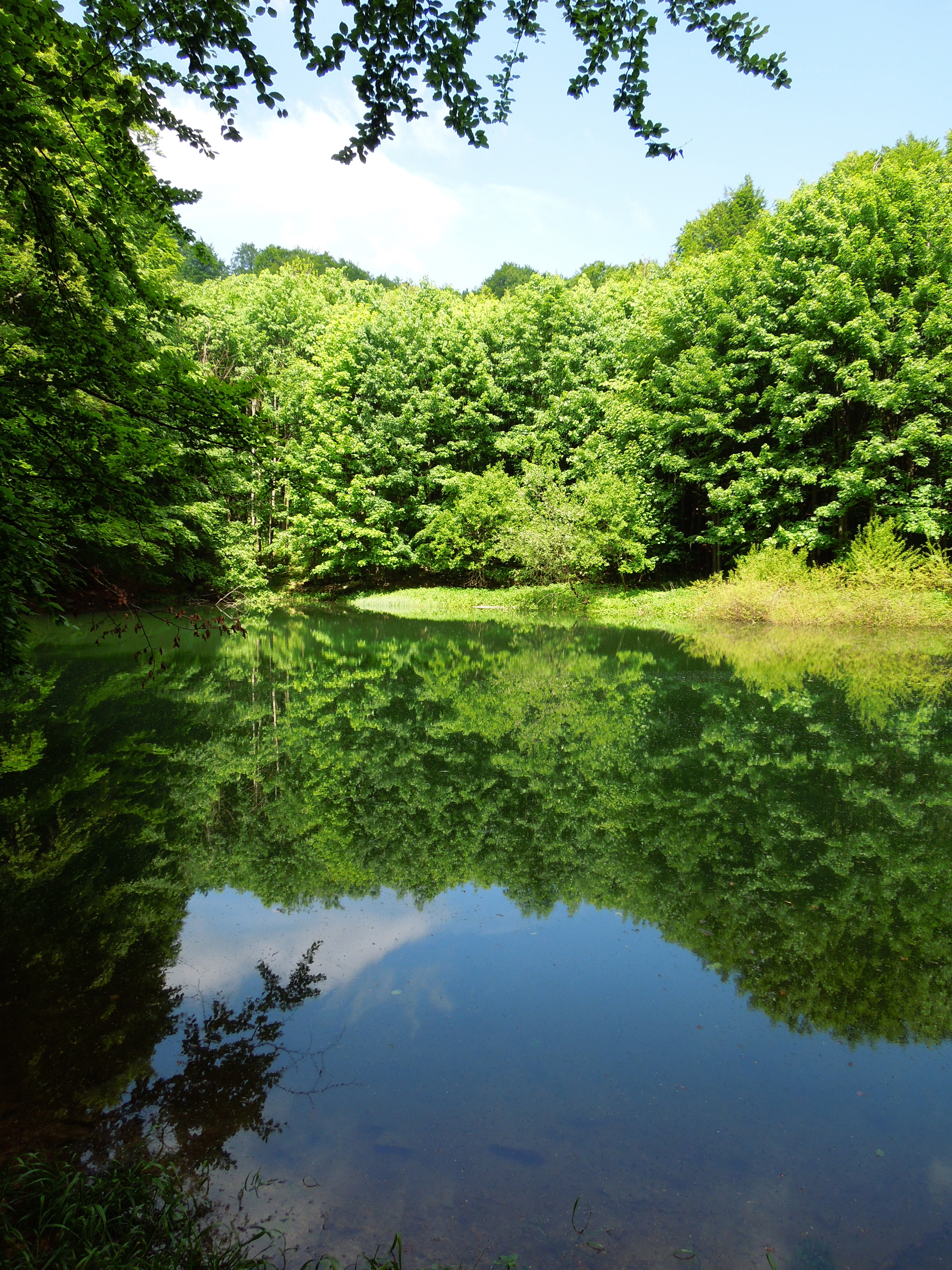
Malé Morské oko in August.

== Surroundings ==
The lake belongs to the Vihorlatský prales area, also abbreviated as Vihorlat, which was inscribed on the UNESCO World Heritage List in 2007 in the category Primeval Beech Forests of the Carpathians and the Ancient Beech Forests of Germany. The reason for this was the preserved beech forests with over 240-year-old specimens. It also belongs to the Morské oko site (SKUEV0209), which is a Natura 2000 site of European importance.

== Gallery ==
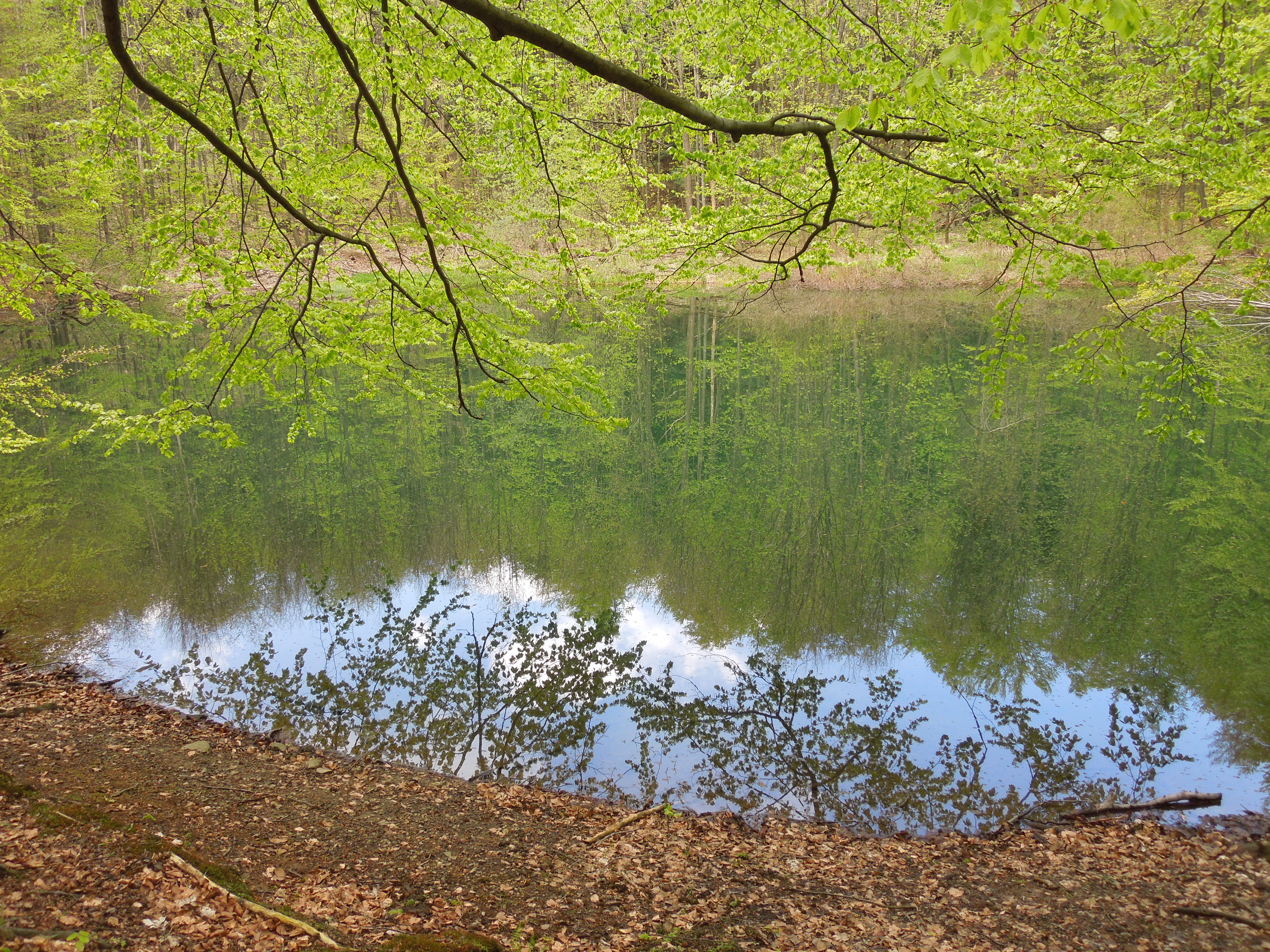
Malé Morské oko in May

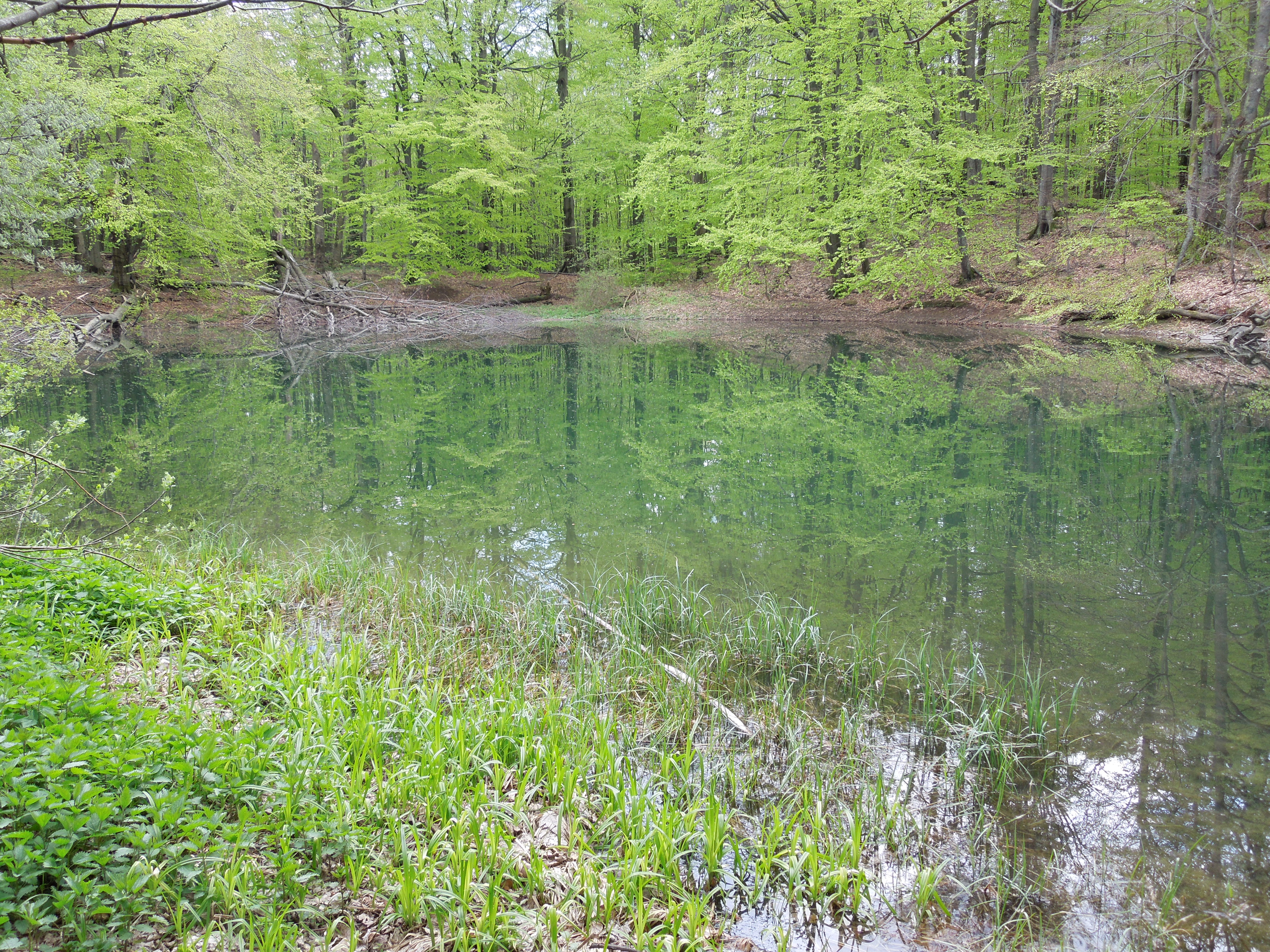

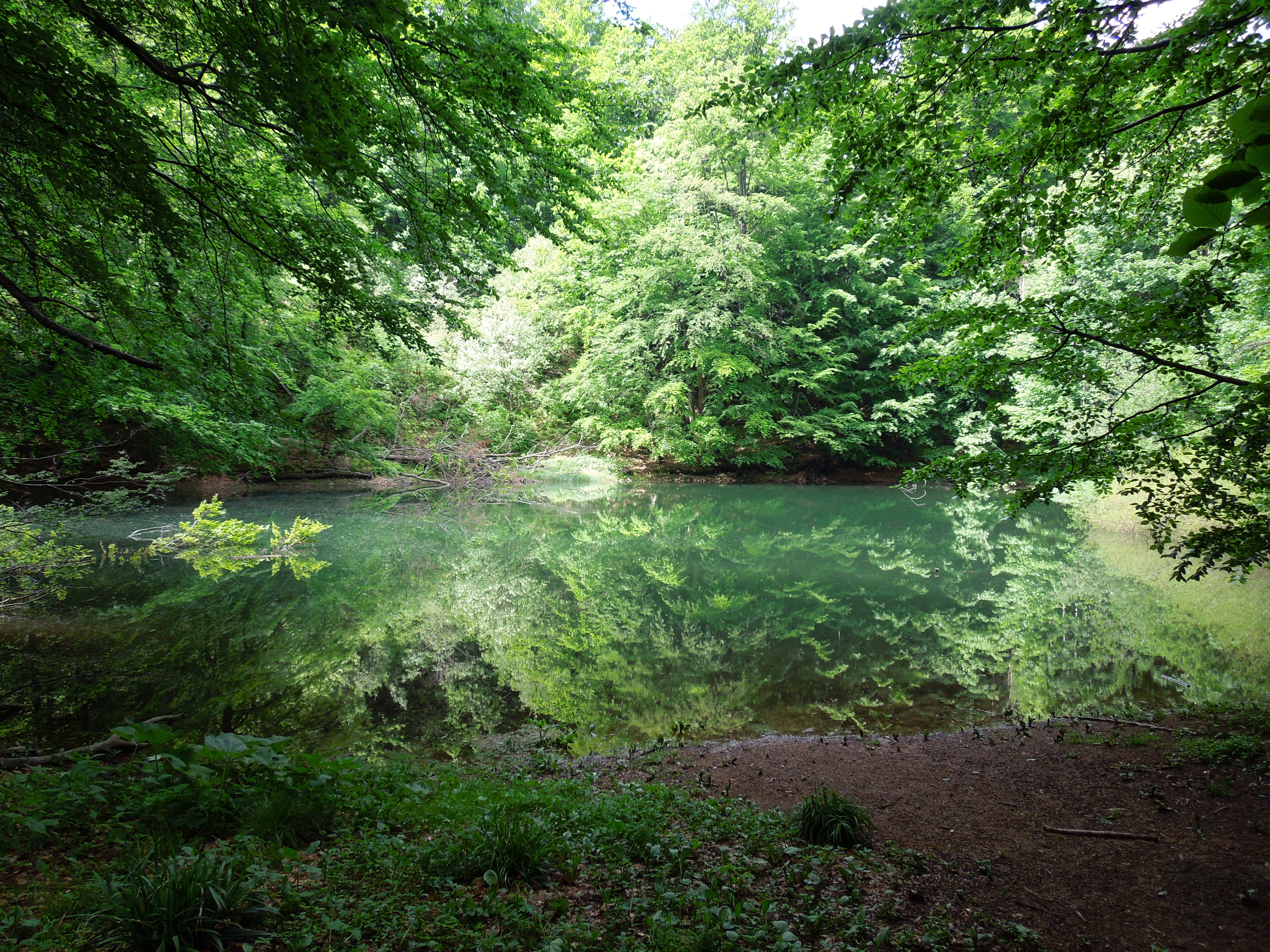

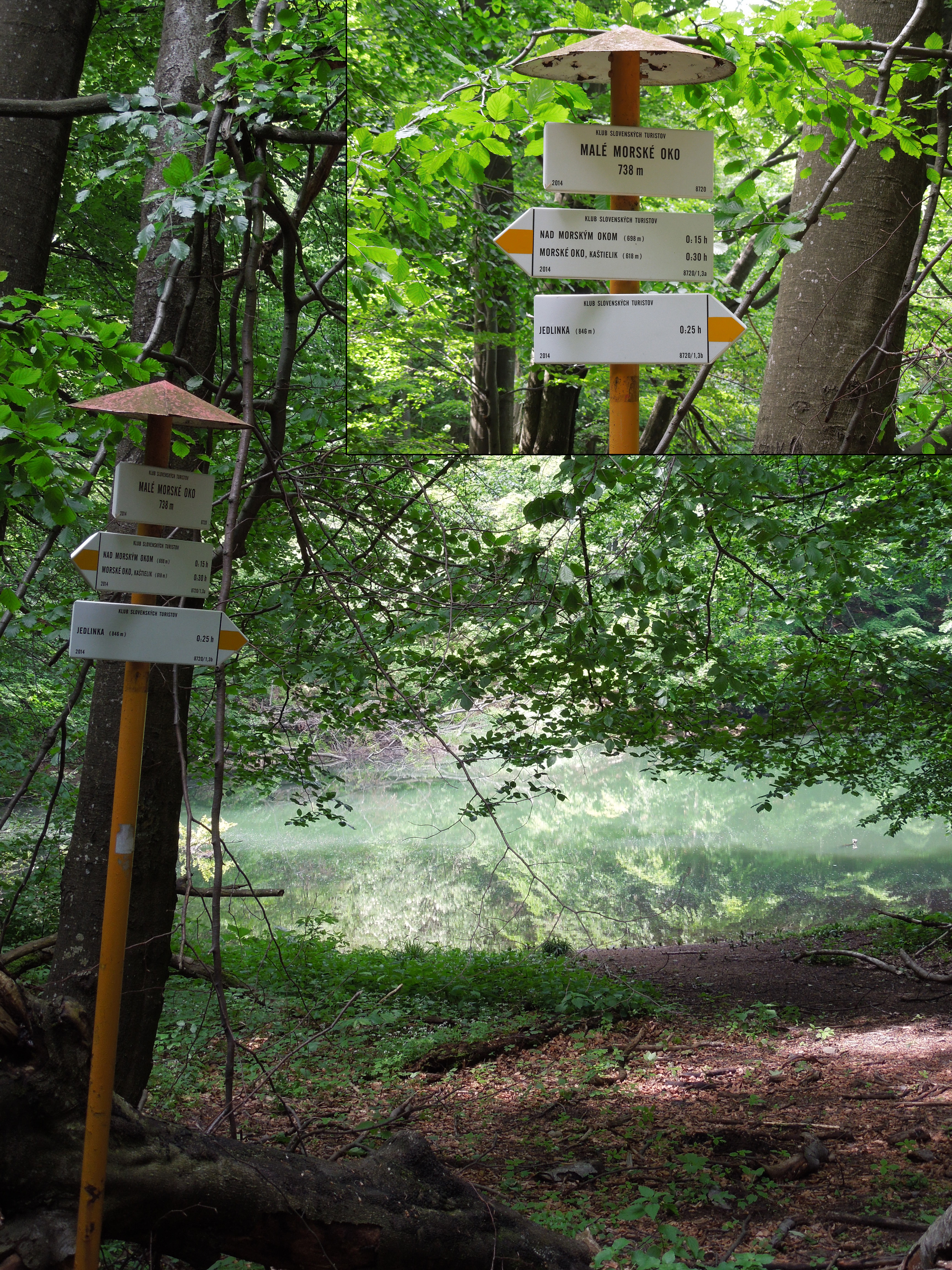
Tourist sign by the Malé Morsko oko

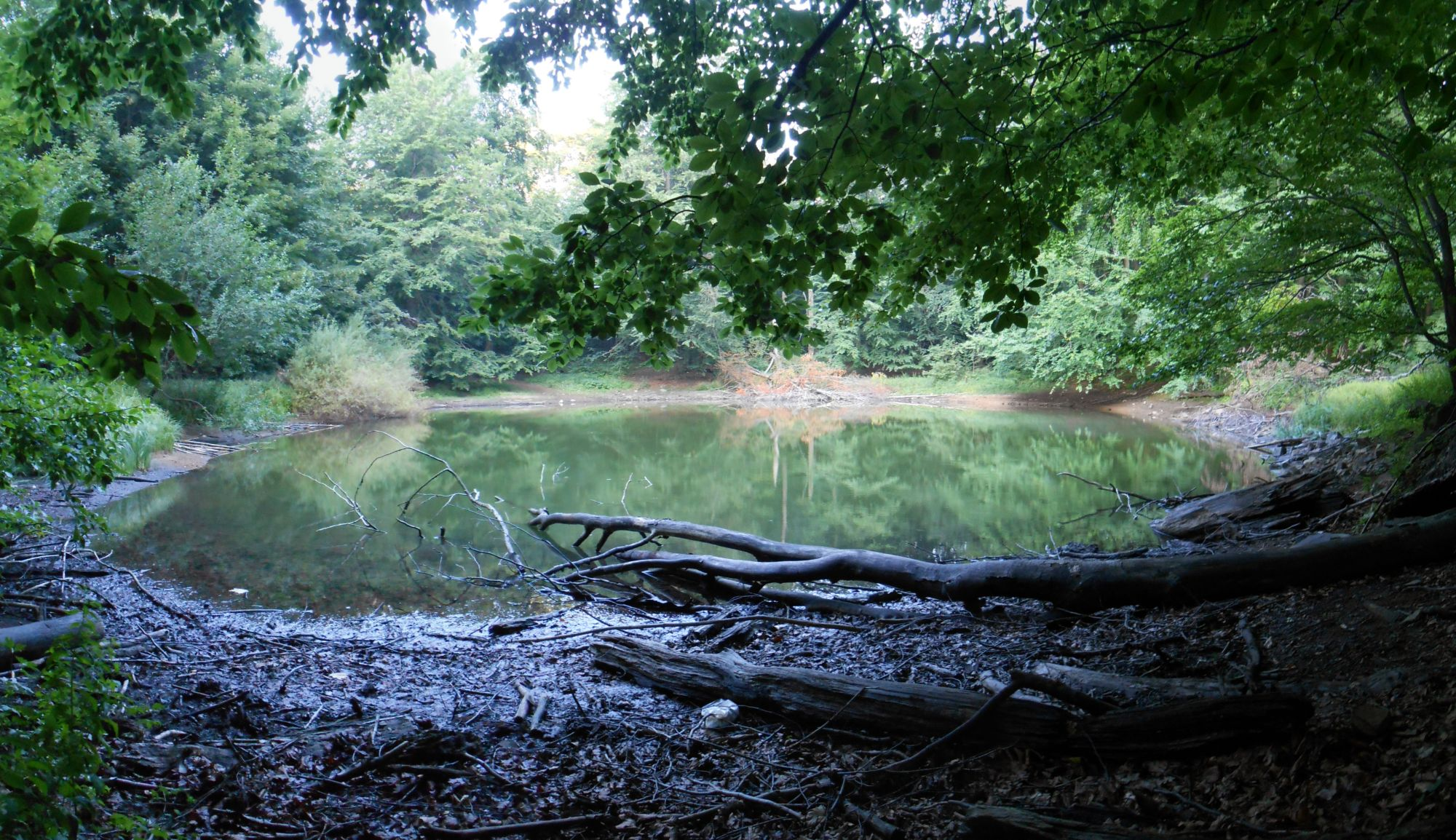
Malé Morské oko in August

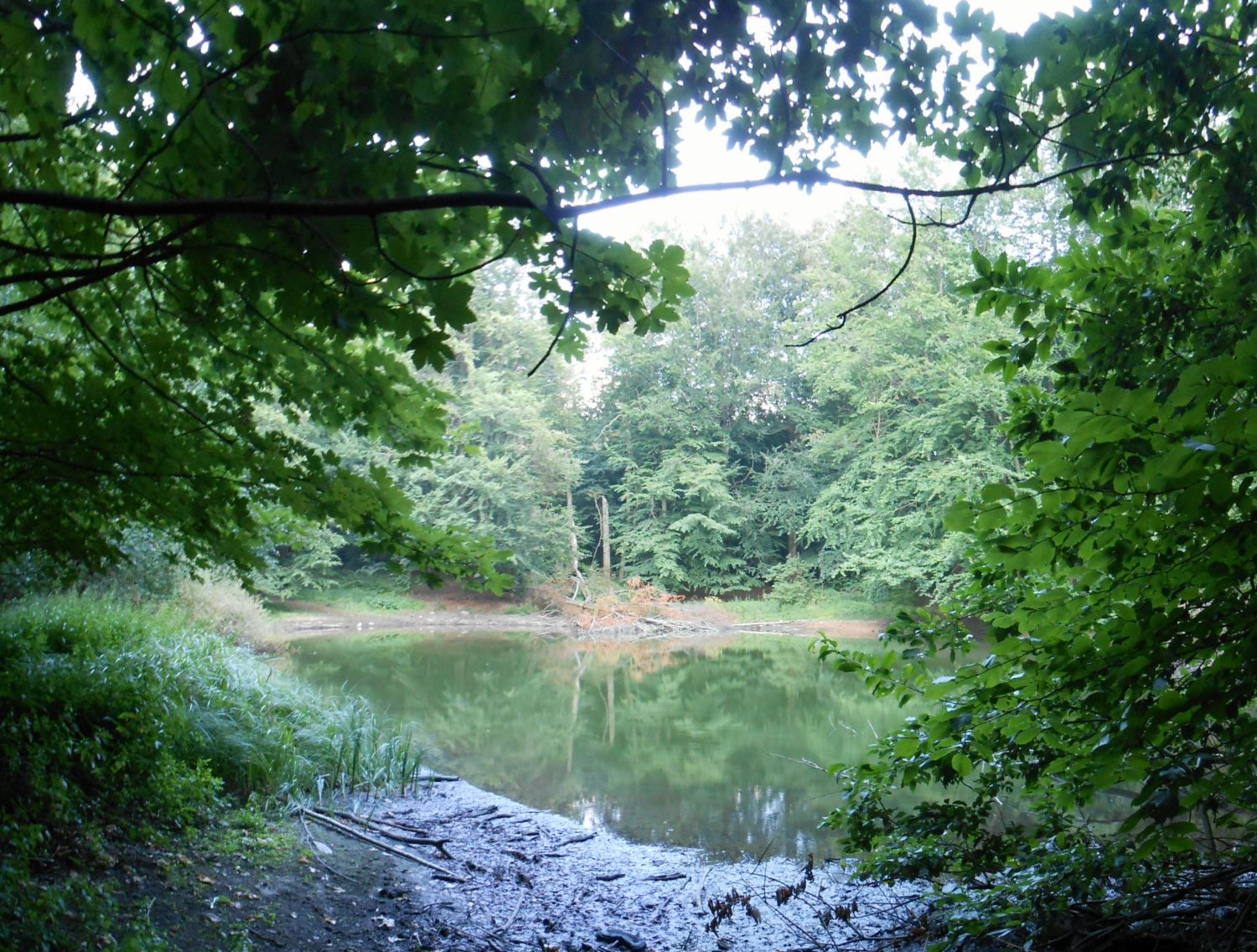

== See also ==
- List of lakes of Slovakia
