= Blatné (lake) =

- Location within Slovakia
- Location: Slovakia
- Coordinates: 49°00′10″N 19°09′45″E
- Type: lake
- Surface area: 1.55 hectares (3.8 acres)

Blatné is a lake in Slovakia. It covers an area of 1.55 hectares (3.8 acres).

== See also ==
- List of lakes of Slovakia
