= Hlboké (lake) =

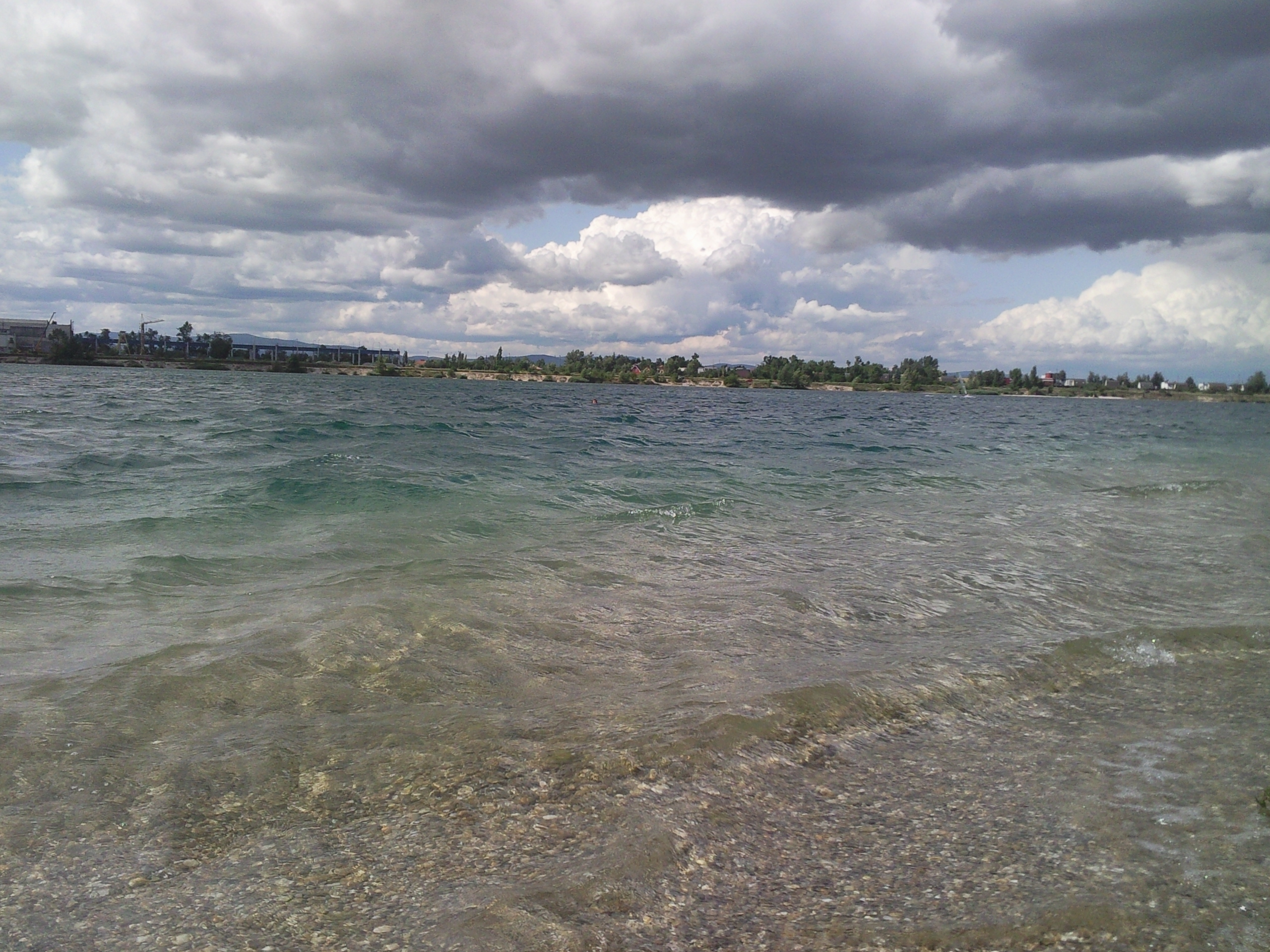
- Čiernovodské jazero

- Location within Slovakia
- Location: Slovakia
- Coordinates: 48°12′38″N 17°25′48″E
- Type: lake

Hlboké is a lake in Slovakia. It is noted for its windsurfing.

== See also ==
- List of lakes of Slovakia
