= Baňur =

Lake in Slovakia

- Location within Slovakia
- Location: Slovakia
- Coordinates: 49°12′40″N 20°40′05″E
- Type: lake

Baňur is a small lake in the Stará Ľubovňa district in northern Slovakia. It is located in the Levočské vrchy in the cadastre of the municipality of Jakubany on the southeastern slope of Repiska (1250 m). It is gradually shrinking due to deposits of stones and gravel. Its original area was 0.179 ha, of which approximately 0.0744 ha were removed by deposits. It is elongated from northwest to southeast with a length of 112 m and a maximum width of 25 m. The greatest measured depth is 3.5 m. It was formed by damming the valley of a stream during a landslide in the flysch zone. The name of the lake in the local dialect means deeper water in the river. Locals also call it Ozero.

== History ==
Baňur was formed by a natural process that dates back to ancient times. Water has accumulated here over the millennia, creating this picturesque body of water. In the past, the area around the lake was known for its rich biodiversity and was inhabited by various species of plants and animals. With the development of tourism, the lake has become a popular place for recreation and relaxation, which contributed to its protection within the Ponitrie Protected Landscape Area.

== See also ==
- List of lakes of Slovakia
