= Valaškovce =

Coordinates: 48°56′N 22°06′E

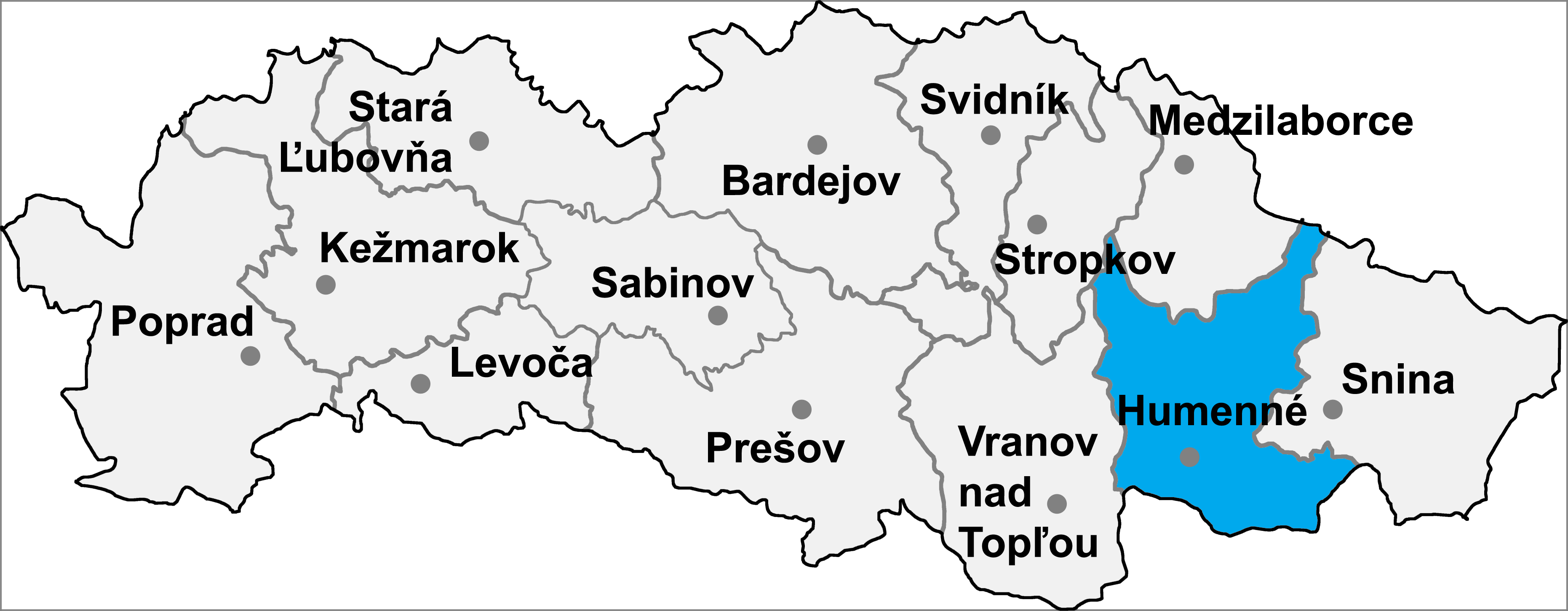
Location of Humenné District in the Prešov Region.

Valaškovce is a municipality and former village and in Humenné District in the Prešov Region of north-east Slovakia.
