= Opatovské jazierko =

Nature reserve in Slovakia

Coordinates: 47.79397°N 17.68649°E

- IUCN category Ia (strict nature reserve)
- Interactive map of Opatovské jazierko
- Area: 0.023 km^{2} (0.0089 sq mi)
- Established: 1993
- Governing body: ŠOP - S-CHKO Dunajské luhy

Opatovské jazierko is a nature reserve in the Slovak municipality of Medveďov in the Dunajská Streda District. The nature reserve covers an area of 2.3 ha of the Danube floodplain area.

== Description ==
The protected area is an important drinking-water reservoir and has landscape-ecological, esthetical and biological significance. With the neighbouring protected areas it creates a valuable complex of floodplain biotopes with a number of rare plants and animals.
