= Štrbské pleso =

Lake in the High Tatra Mountains, Slovakia

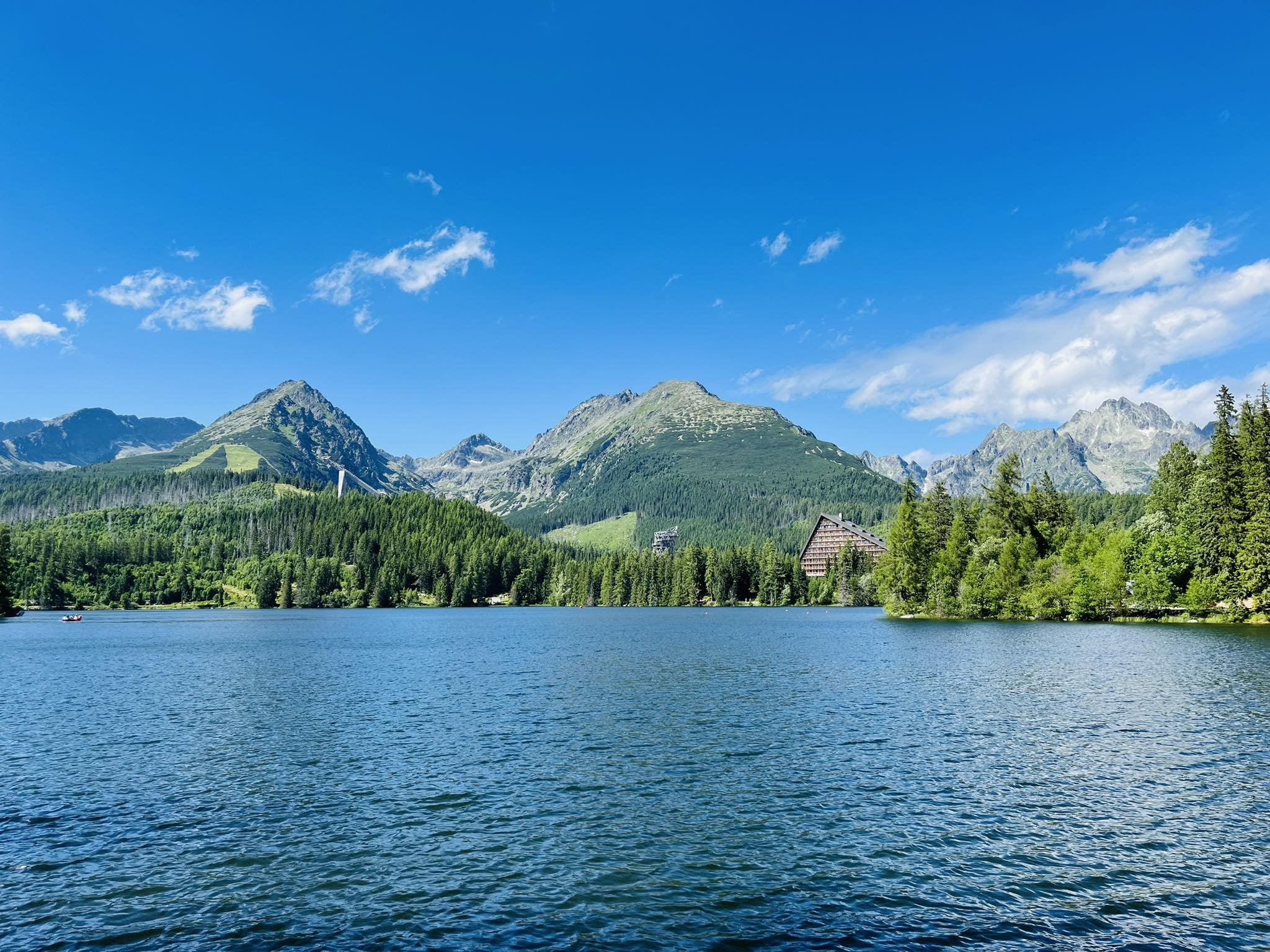
- Štrbské pleso

- Location within Slovakia
- Location: High Tatras
- Coordinates: 49°07′21″N 20°03′30″E
- Type: moraine-dammed
- Primary inflows: Underground
- Primary outflows: Underground
- Basin countries: Slovakia
- Max. length: 640 m (0.40 mi)
- Max. width: 600 m (0.37 mi)
- Surface area: 19.76 ha (48.8 acres)
- Max. depth: 20 m (66 ft)
- Water volume: 1.284 hm^{3} (1,041 acre⋅ft)
- Surface elevation: 1,346 m (4,416 ft)
- Frozen: more than 155 days/year
- Islands: Limited rocks
- Settlements: Štrbské Pleso

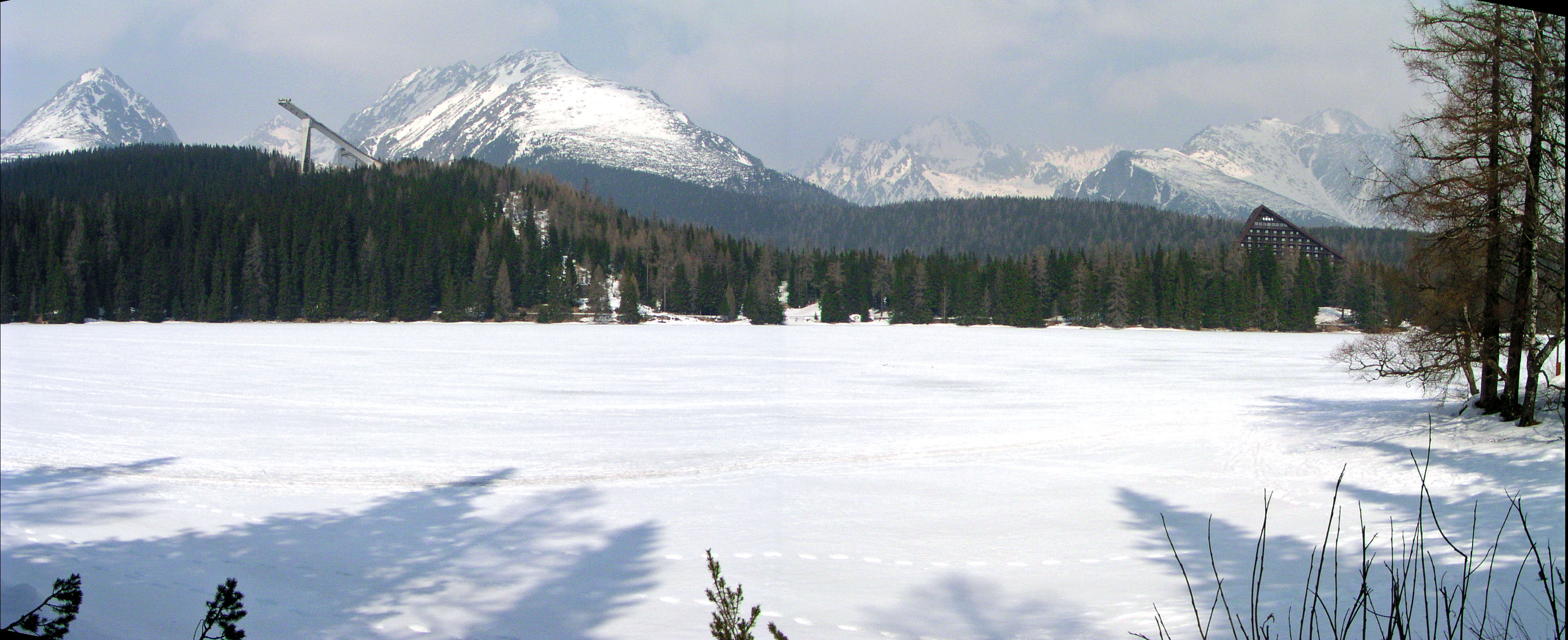
Frozen over for 155 days a year

Štrbské pleso (German: Tschirmer See, Polish: Szczyrbskie jezioro, Hungarian: Csorba-tó) is a picturesque mountain lake of glacial origin and a top tourist destination in the High Tatras, Slovakia. It is the second-largest glacial lake on the Slovak side of the High Tatras, after Veľké Hincovo pleso. Maximum depth is 20 metres (66 ft).

== Description ==
Štrbské pleso is now part of the neighborhood of Štrbské Pleso (spelled with a capital P). It is on the municipal lands of the village of Štrba, after which Štrbské pleso ("Lake Štrba") is now named. The word pleso ("tarn") is applied only to mountain lakes. The locals used to call it "the puddle" or "pond" (mláka) in the past. It is the second-largest glacial lake on the Slovak side of the High Tatras, after Hincovo Pleso, to which it loses by 0.8 acres (3,200 m^{2}). It is fed by underground springs and has no visible outflow stream. Its surface remains frozen for around 155 days per year.

== See also ==
- Tatra Mountains
- Tourism in Slovakia
- Vysoké Tatry (town)
