= Slanská Huta =

Village and municipality in Slovakia

Slanská Huta Szalánchuta
- Municipality
- Flag

- Location of Slanská Huta in the Košice Region Location of Slanská Huta in Slovakia
- Coordinates: 48.58°N 21.47°E
- Country: Slovakia
- Region: Košice Region
- District: Košice-okolie District
- First mentioned: 1772

Area
  - Total: 14.16 km^{2} (5.47 sq mi)
- Elevation: 462 m (1,516 ft)

Population (2025)
  - Total: 265
- Time zone: UTC+1 (CET)
  - Summer (DST): UTC+2 (CEST)
- Postal code: 441 7
- Area code: +421 55
- Vehicle registration plate (until 2022): KS
- Website: www.slanskahuta.sk

Slanská Huta (Hungarian: Szalánchuta) is a village and municipality in Košice-okolie District in the Košice Region of eastern Slovakia.

== History ==
In historical records the village was first mentioned in 1772.

== Geography ==
The municipality lies at an altitude of 462 metres (1,516 ft) and covers an area of 14.16 km^{2} (5.47 sq mi) (2025).

== Population ==
Population statistic (10 years)
| Year | 1995 | 2005 | 2015 | 2025 |
|---|---|---|---|---|
| Count | 257 | 212 | 245 | 265 |
| Difference | | −17.50% | +15.56% | +8.16% |

Population statistic
| Year | 2024 | 2025 |
|---|---|---|
| Count | 260 | 265 |
| Difference | | +1.92% |

It has a population of 265 people (31 December 2025).

=== Ethnicity ===
Census 2021 (1+ %)
| Ethnicity | Number | Fraction |
|---|---|---|
| Slovak | 230 | 96.23% |
| Not found out | 9 | 3.76% |
| Total | 239 | |

In year 2021 was 239 people by ethnicity 230 as Slovak, 9 as Not found out, 2 as Hungarian, 1 as Czech and 1 as Rusyn.

Note on population: The difference values of population numbers in the table "Population statistic" and in the sections "Ethnicity" & "Religion" is caused by the use of various statistical methods.

=== Religion ===
Census 2021 (1+ %)
| Religion | Number | Fraction |
|---|---|---|
| Roman Catholic Church | 184 | 76.99% |
| None | 31 | 12.97% |
| Not found out | 9 | 3.77% |
| Evangelical Church | 5 | 2.09% |
| Calvinist Church | 4 | 1.67% |
| Greek Catholic Church | 3 | 1.26% |
| Total | 239 | |

In year 2021 was 239 people by religion 184 from Roman Catholic Church, 31 from None, 9 from Not found out, 5 from Evangelical Church, 4 from Calvinist Church, 3 from Greek Catholic Church, 1 from Paganism and natural spirituality, 1 from Other and 1 from Ad hoc movements.

== Culture ==
The village has a small public library and several stores including food facilities.

== Sport ==
The village has a number of quality sporting facilities including a football ground, a swimming pool and a gym.

== Transport ==
The nearest train station is at Slanec.
