= Skalnaté Pleso (lake) =

Lake in Slovakia

Coordinates: 49°11′N 20°14′E

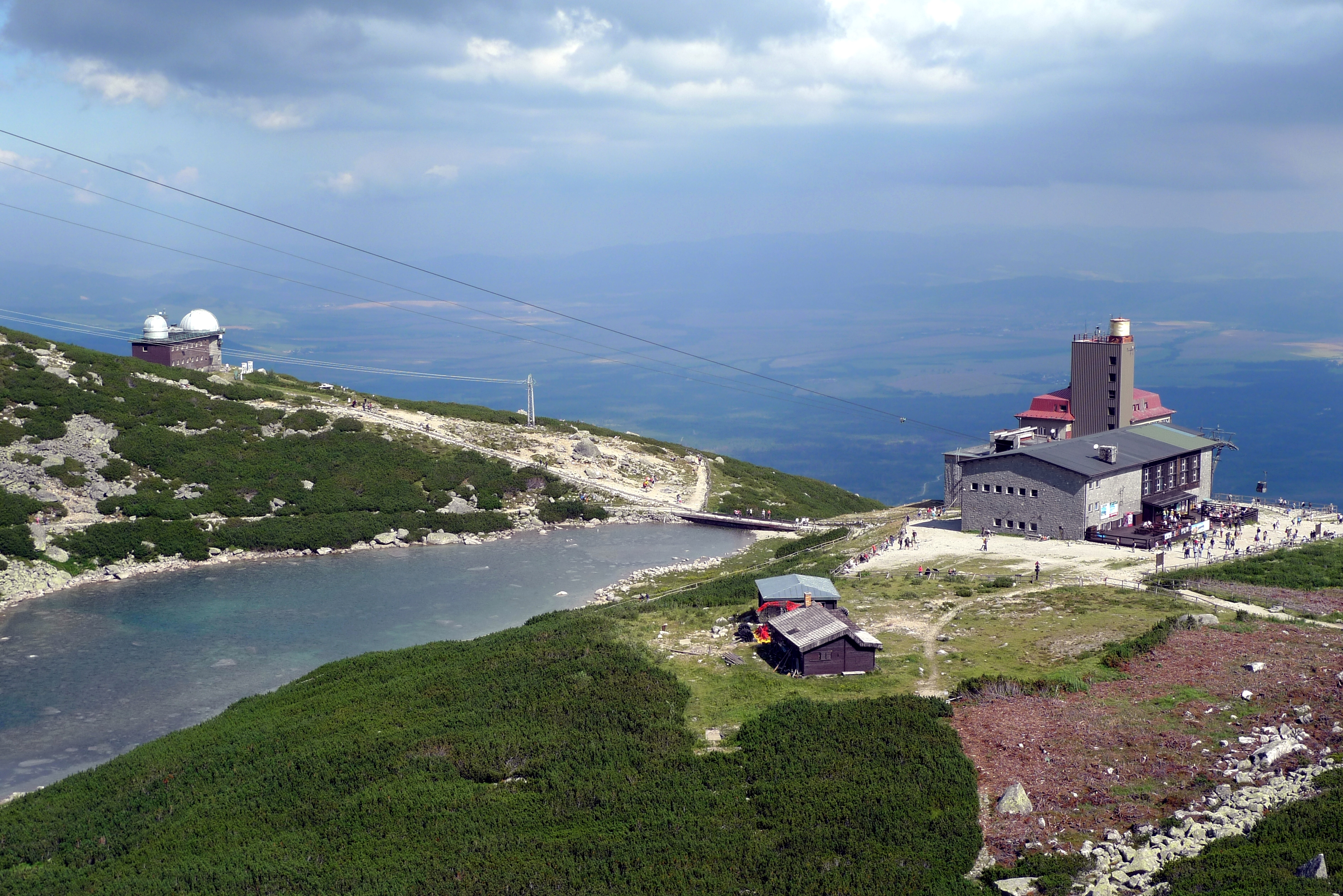
Skalnaté pleso in 2010

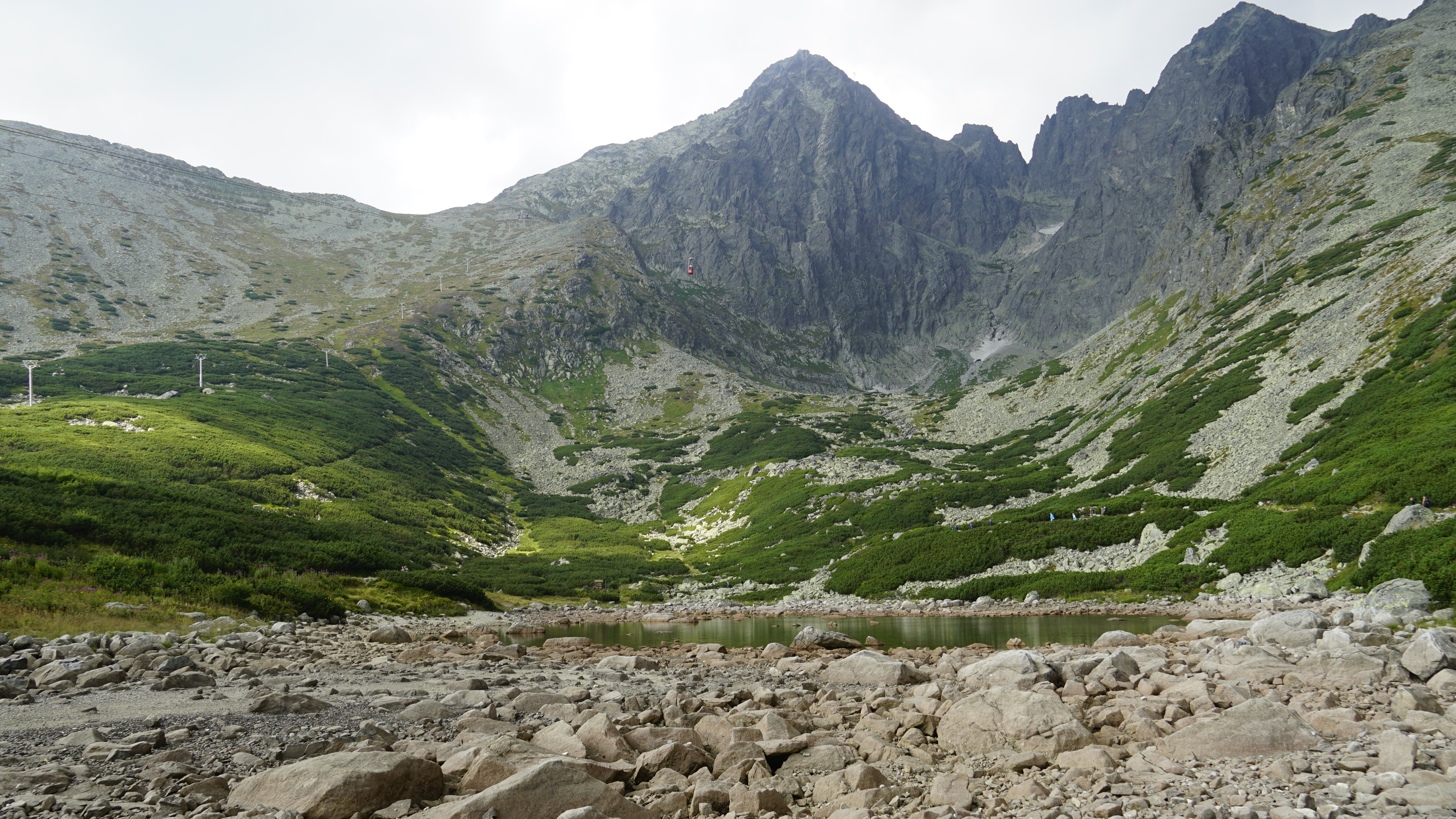
Skalnaté pleso in 2019

Skalnaté pleso (1751m) is a lake located in the High Tatras mountains in the north of Slovakia.

The highest wind speed ever recorded in Slovakia was recorded here on 29 November 1965, when a wind with the speed of 78,6 m/s (283 km/h) was recorded.

In November 2021, there was a rare occurrence, as Pleso dried out entirely. This was the result of a dry period, as it is filled solely by precipitation, and continued evaporation. The lake has refilled since.

In the dry season, the lake is without water because the impermeable bedrock was disturbed during the construction of the cable car. The Skalnatý Brook flows through the lake, but in the dry season it dries up and appears in the valley below the lake.
