= Veľké Hincovo pleso =

Lake in Slovakia

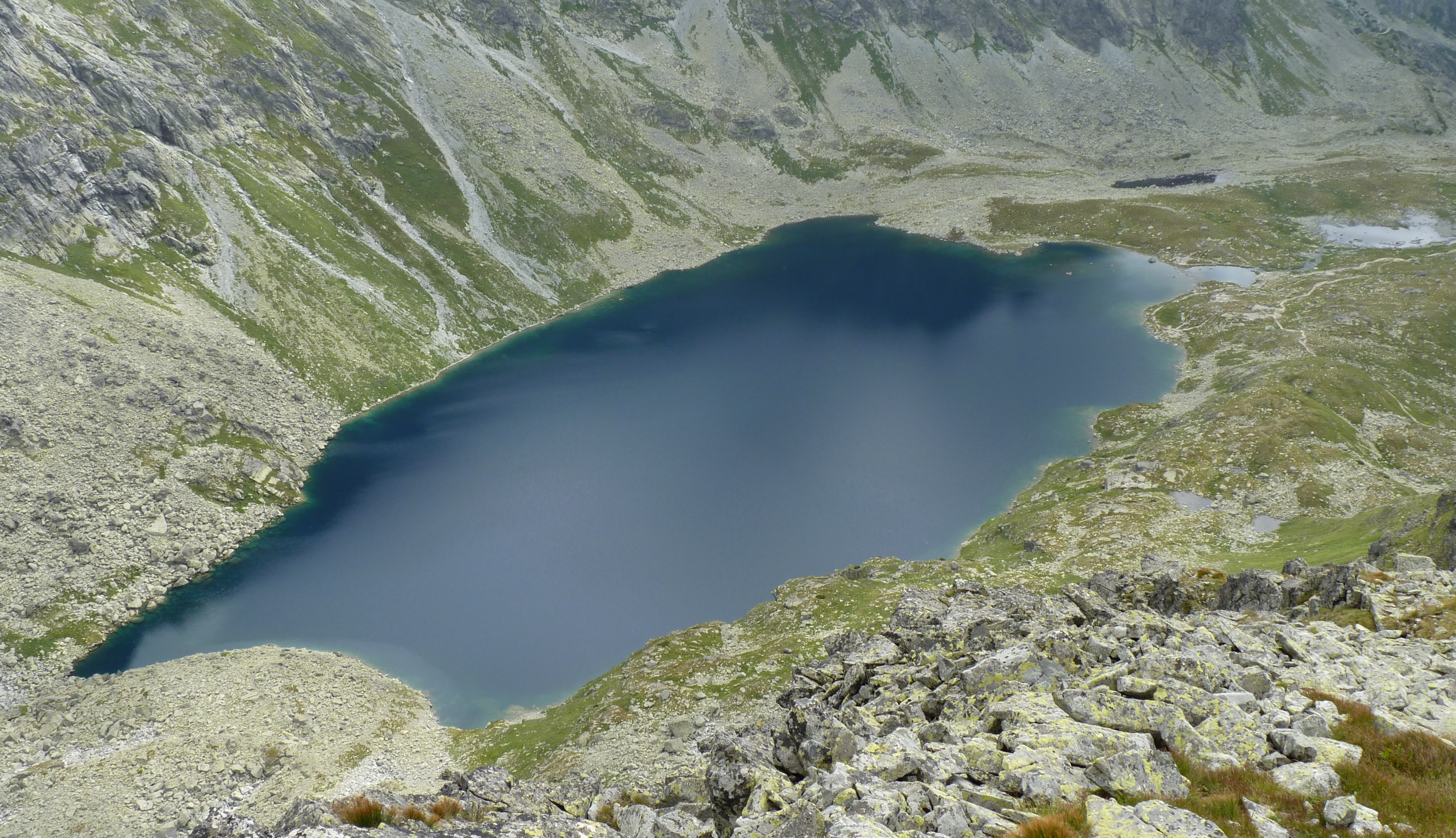

- Location within Slovakia
- Location: High Tatras
- Coordinates: 49°10′45″N 20°03′35″E
- Type: moraine-dammed
- Primary inflows: Underground
- Basin countries: Slovakia
- Max. length: 740 m (0.46 mi)
- Max. width: 340 m (0.21 mi)
- Surface area: 20.1 ha (49.7 acres)
- Max. depth: 53 m (174 ft)
- Surface elevation: 1,946 m (6,385 ft)
- Frozen: 270 days/year

Veľké Hincovo pleso is the biggest and deepest mountain lake of glacial origin in the High Tatras, Slovakia. The maximum depth is 53 metres (174 ft). Its surface remains frozen for around 270 days per year.
