= Vihorlat-Gutin Area =

Mountain ranges in Slovakia, Ukraine and Romania

Coordinates: 48.4333°N 23.1500°E

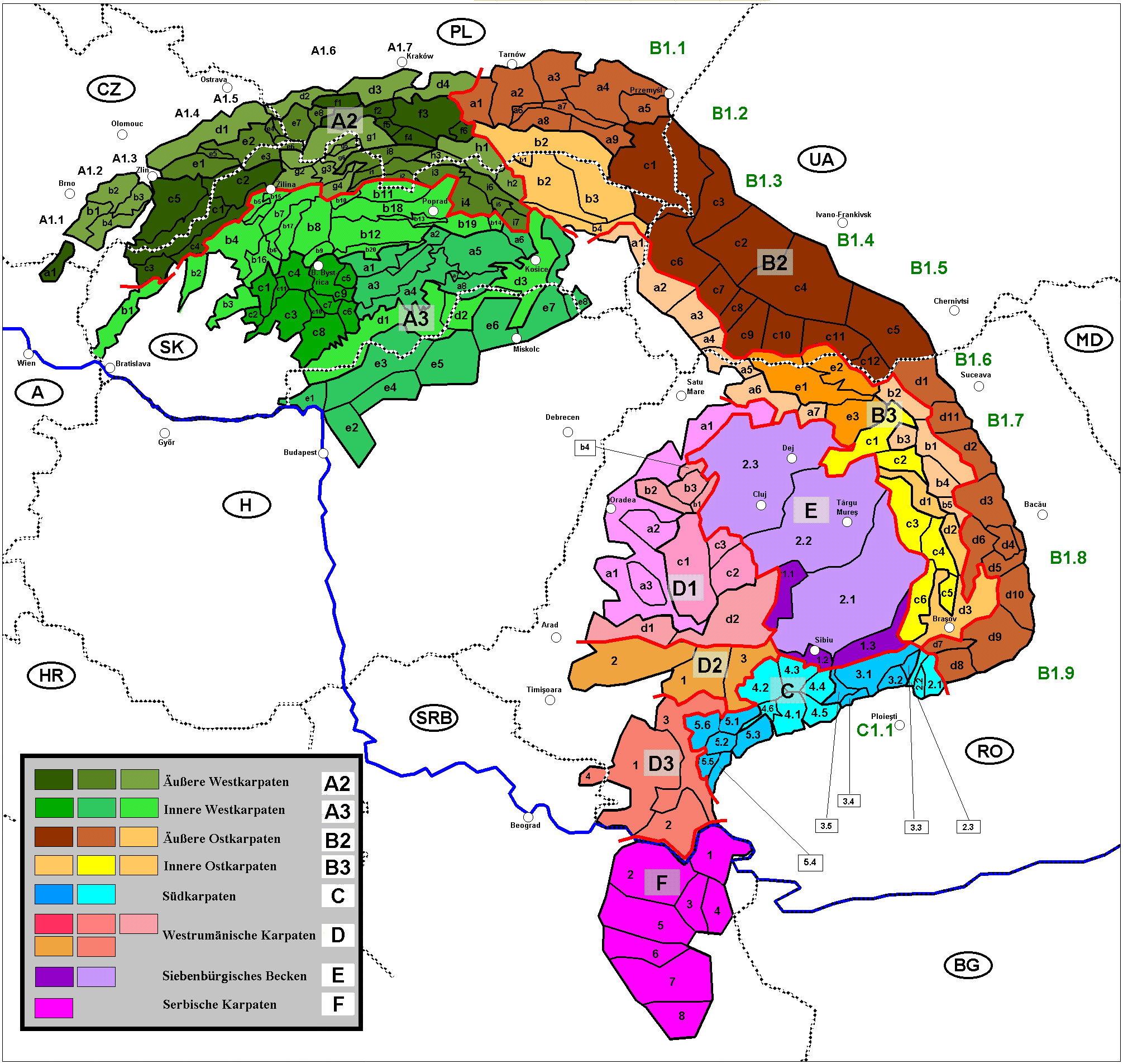
Divisions of the Carpathians, including Vihorlat-Gutin Area (marked by light orange color and labeled as "a": from a1 to a7)

The Vihorlat-Gutin Area (Slovak: Vihorlatsko-gutinská oblasť; Ukrainian: Вигорлат-Гутинський хребет; Hungarian: Vihorlát–Gutin-hegyvidék) is a region of mountain ranges stretching from eastern Slovakia, through western Ukraine, into northern Romania.

Geologically these ranges are considered part of the Inner Eastern Carpathians. Within Romania, however, it is traditional to divide the Eastern Carpathians in Romanian territory into three geographical groups (north, center, south), instead in "inner" and "outer" sections. The Romanian portions of Vihorlat-Gutin Area are considered part of the northern Carpathians of Maramureş and Bucovina (Romanian: Munţii Carpaţi ai Maramureşului şi Bucovinei).

== Subdivisions ==
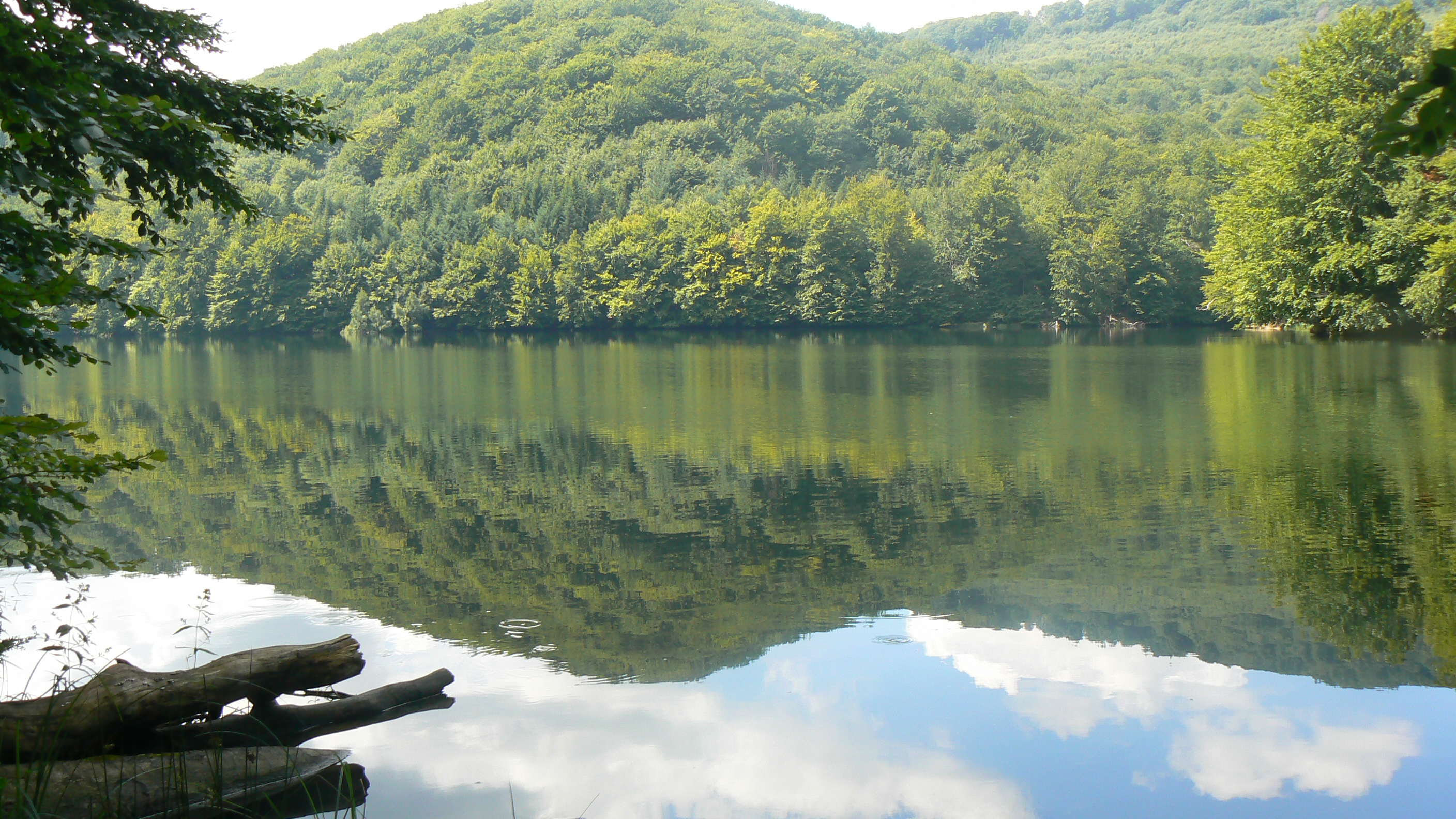
Lake Morské oko ("Eye of the Sea"), in the Vihorlat Mountains of Slovakia

These mountain ranges include:

- Vihorlat Mountains (Slovak: Vihorlatské vrchy; Ukrainian: Вигорлат), encompassing the Vihorlat Protected Landscape Area and the Morské oko (SK and UA); marked a1 on the map
- Makovytsia (Ukrainian: Маковиця); marked a2 on the map
- Velikyi Dil (Ukrainian: Великий Діл); marked a3 on the map
- Tupyi (Ukrainian: Тупий); marked a4 on the map
- Oaș Mountains (Romanian: Munţii Oaşului; Ukrainian: Оаш гори) and Oaș Depression (Romanian: Depresiunea Oașului) (UK and RO); marked a5 on the map
- Gutin Mountains (Romanian: Munţii Gutâiului; Ukrainian: Гутинський масив) (RO); marked a6 on the map
- Ţibleş Mountains (Romanian: Munţii Ţibleşului) (RO); marked a7 on the map

== Panorama ==
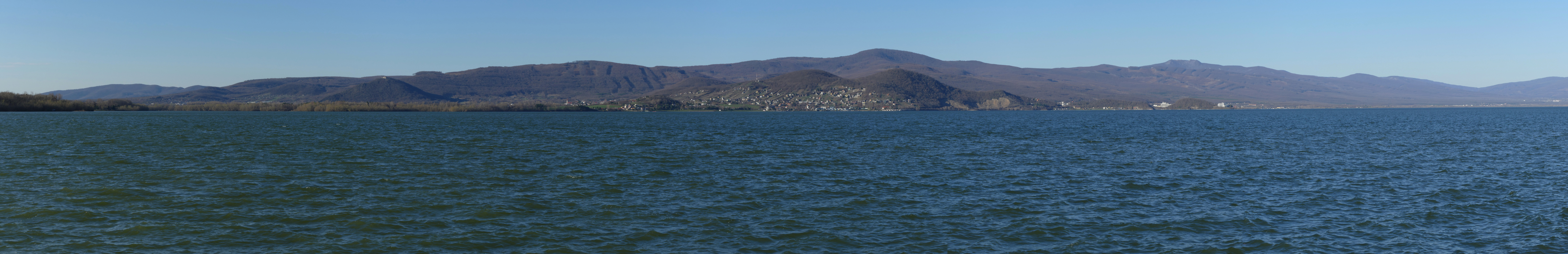
Panorama of Vihorlat Mountains (Slovak: Vihorlatské vrchy) and Zemplínska šírava

== See also ==
- Ukrainian Carpathians
- Romanian Carpathians
