= Vihorlat Mountains =

Mountain range in Slovakia and Ukraine

Coordinates: 48°55′N 22°10′E

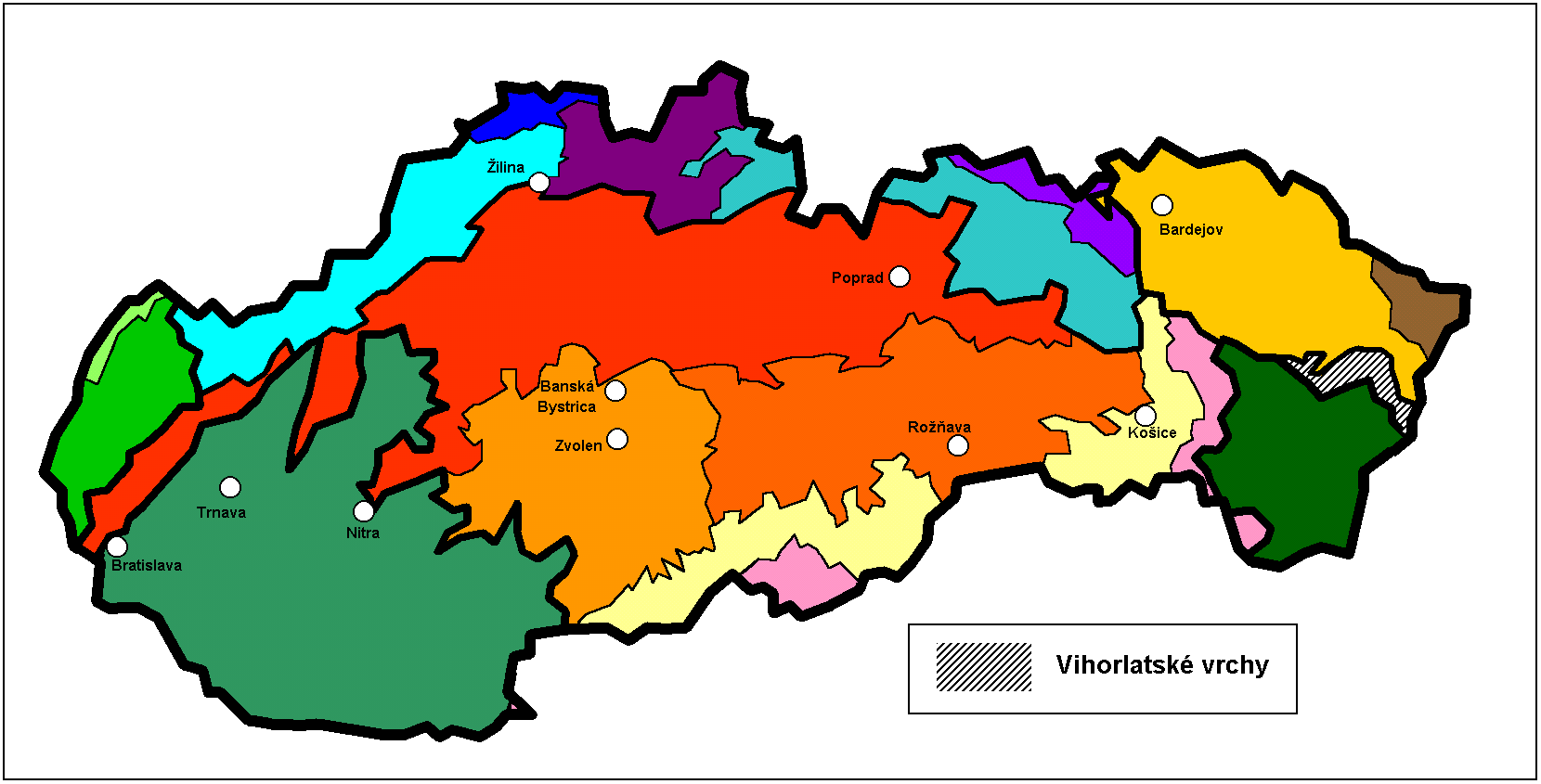
Location of Vihorlat in Slovakia within the geomorphological division of Slovakia (in gray)

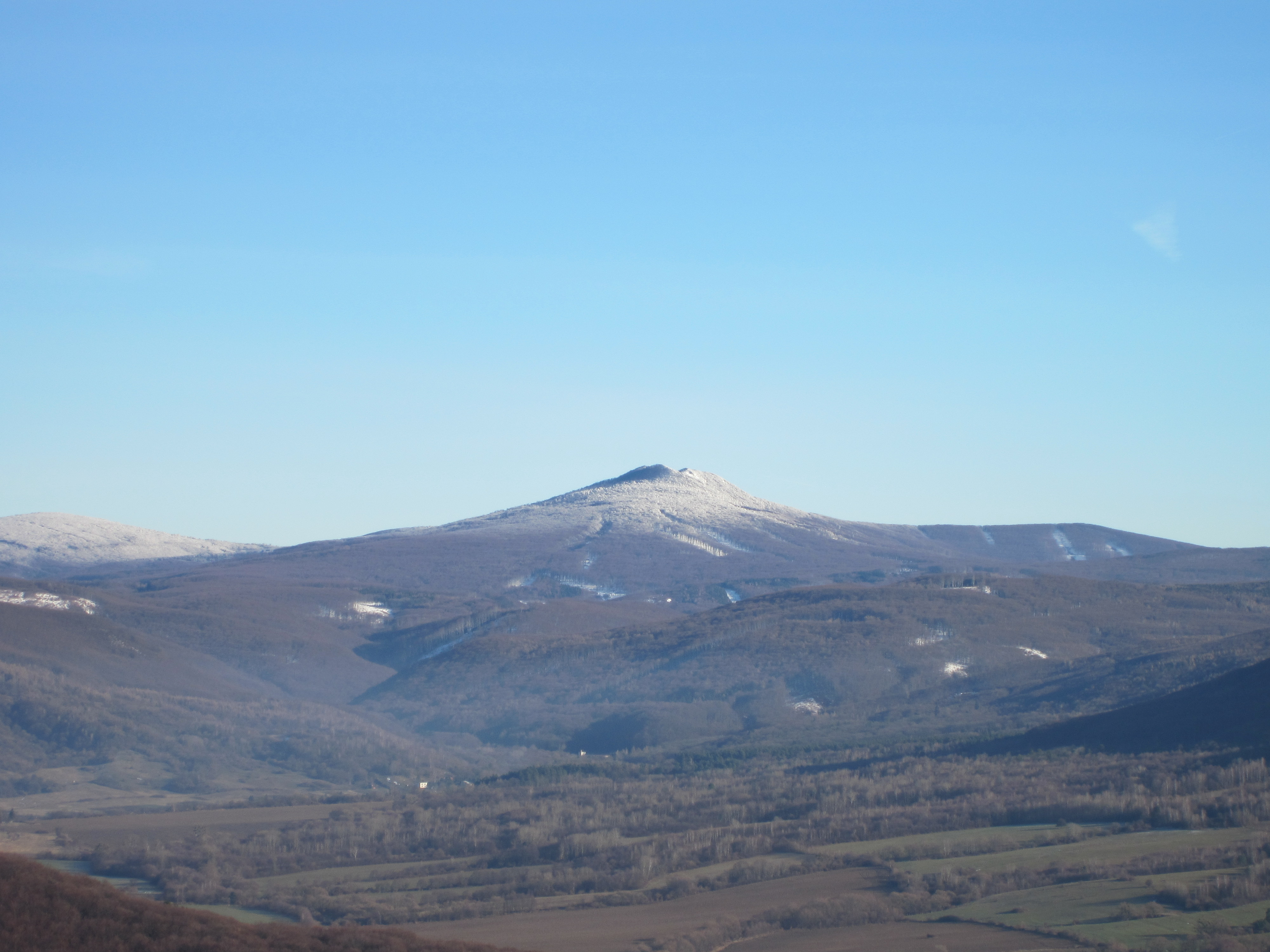
Vihorlat during winter

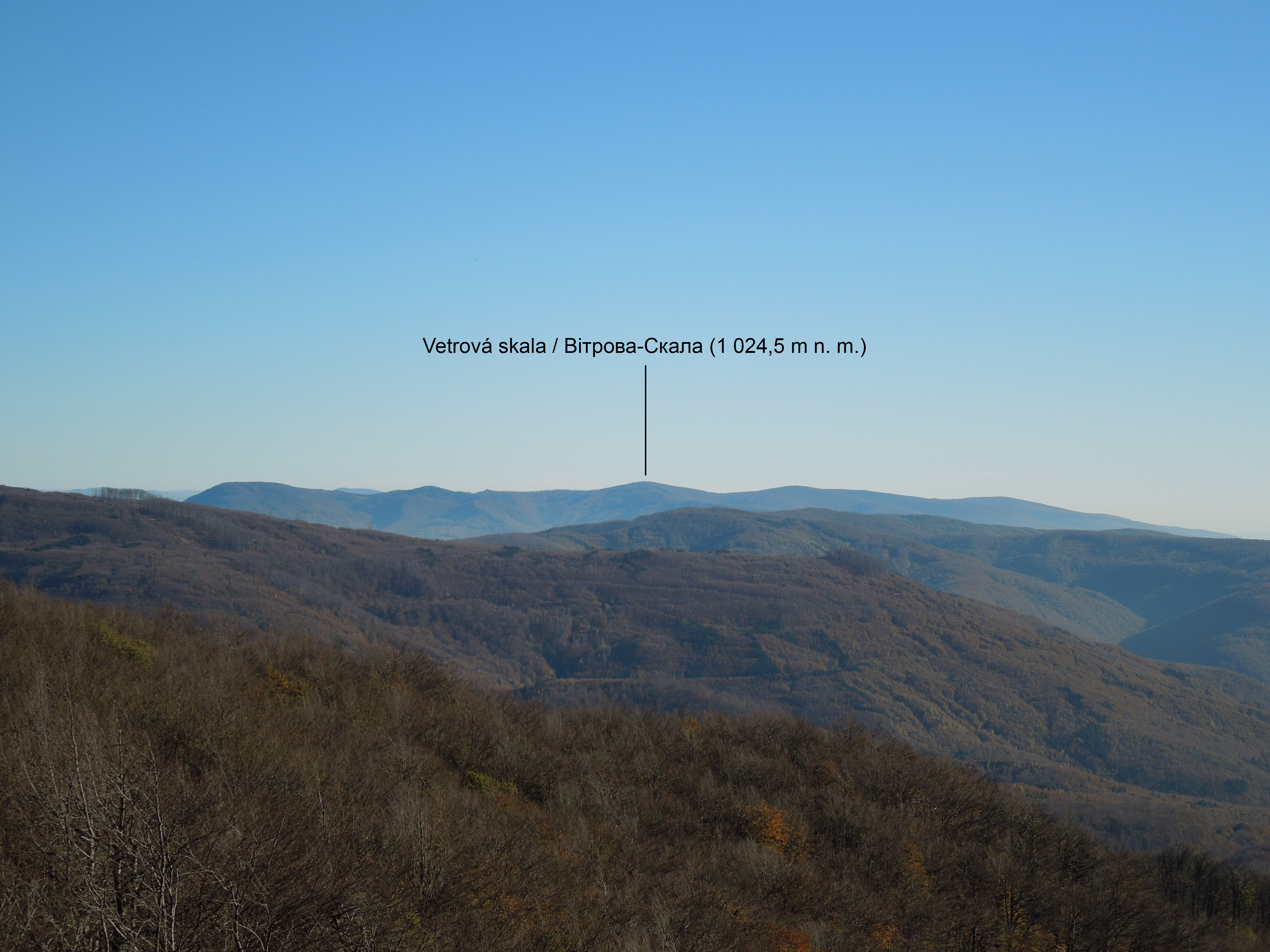
Ukrainian part

Vihorlat Mountains (Slovak: Vihorlatské vrchy; Ukrainian: Вигорлат, Vyhorliat, Hungarian: Vihorlát) or colloquially Vihorlat is a volcanic mountain range in eastern Slovakia and western Ukraine. A part of the range is listed as a World Heritage Site.

== Etymology ==
The name is of Slavic origin. Jozef Martinka suggested the origin in Ruthenian vyharj / vyhar (Slovak: výhor) - a burned forest with a collective suffix -ať. Vygarljať, Vyhorljať - a mountain with many burned places. The Hungarian name Vihorlát derives from Slovak as an intermediate language.

== Vihorlat Mountains in Slovakia ==
The Slovak part is 55 km long, up to 11 km broad and from 400 to 1,076 m high. It belongs to the Vihorlat-Gutin Area group of the Inner Eastern Carpathian Mountains. The middle part of the mountains is protected by the Vihorlat Protected Landscape Area.

Vihorlat is bordered by the Eastern Slovak Lowland (Východoslovenská nížina) in the south and the west. The Beskidian Southern Piedmont (Beskydské predhorie) separates Vihorlat from the Bukovské vrchy mountains and Laborecká vrchovina highlands in the north. The highest peak is Vihorlat at 1,076 m AMSL. The largest lake in the mountain range is Morské oko, which is situated at 618 m AMSL.

== World Heritage Site ==
Kyjovský prales, a primeval beech forest in Vihorlat Mountains, was proclaimed by UNESCO to be a World Heritage Site on June 28, 2007, because of its comprehensive and undisturbed ecological patterns and processes.

== Gallery ==
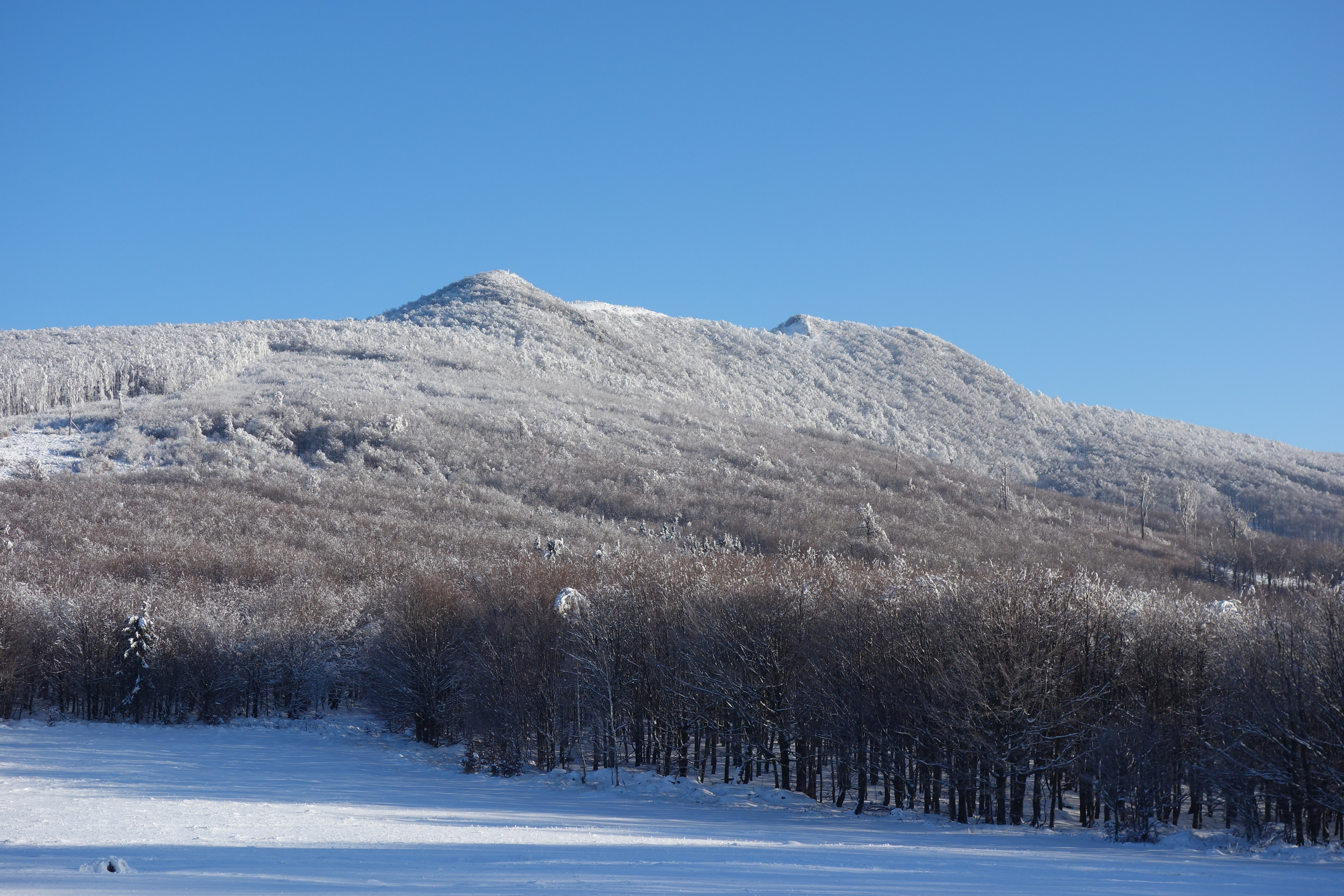
Vihorlat (1,076 m), the highest mountain of Vihorlat Mountains

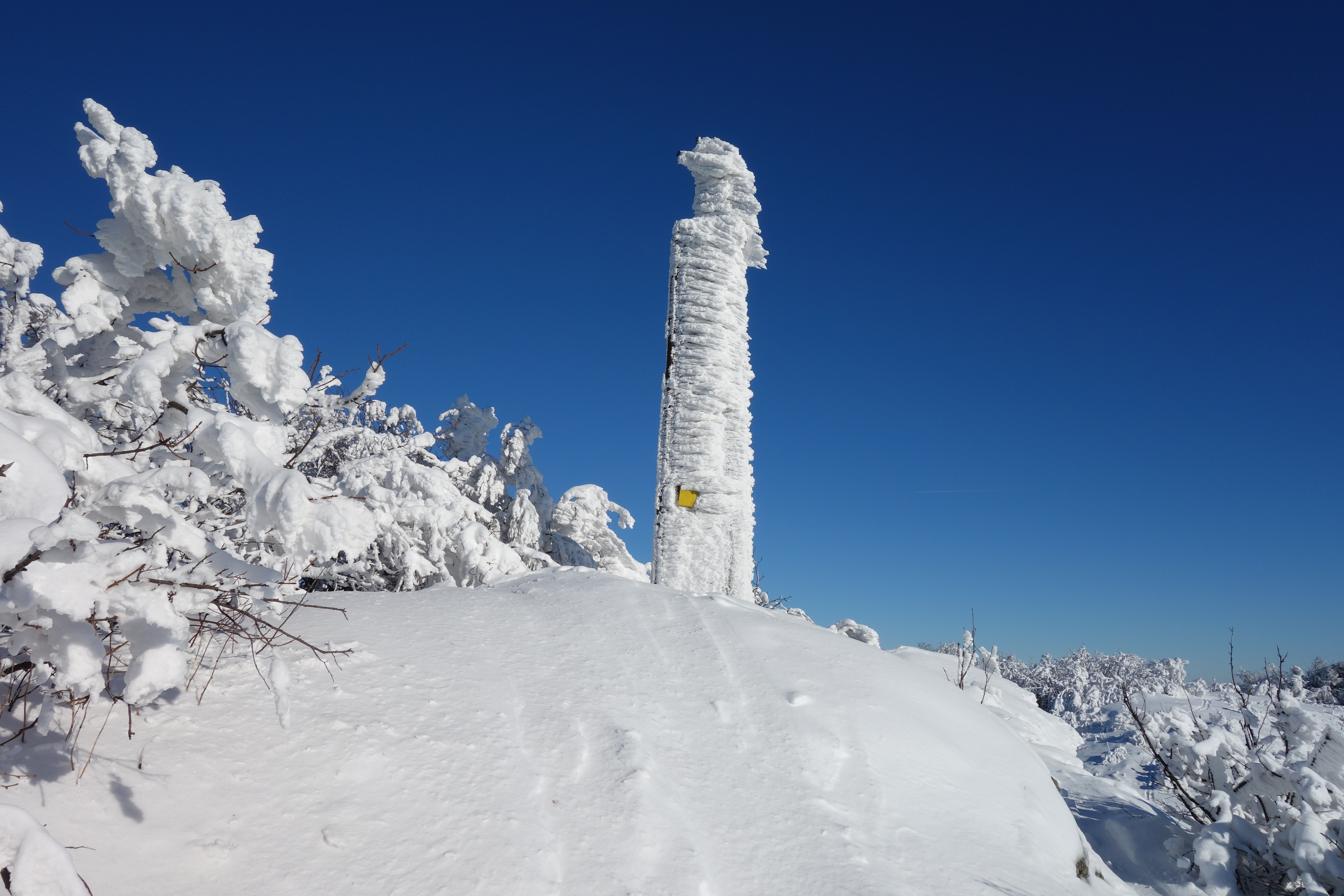
Pylon on top of Vihorlat with rime

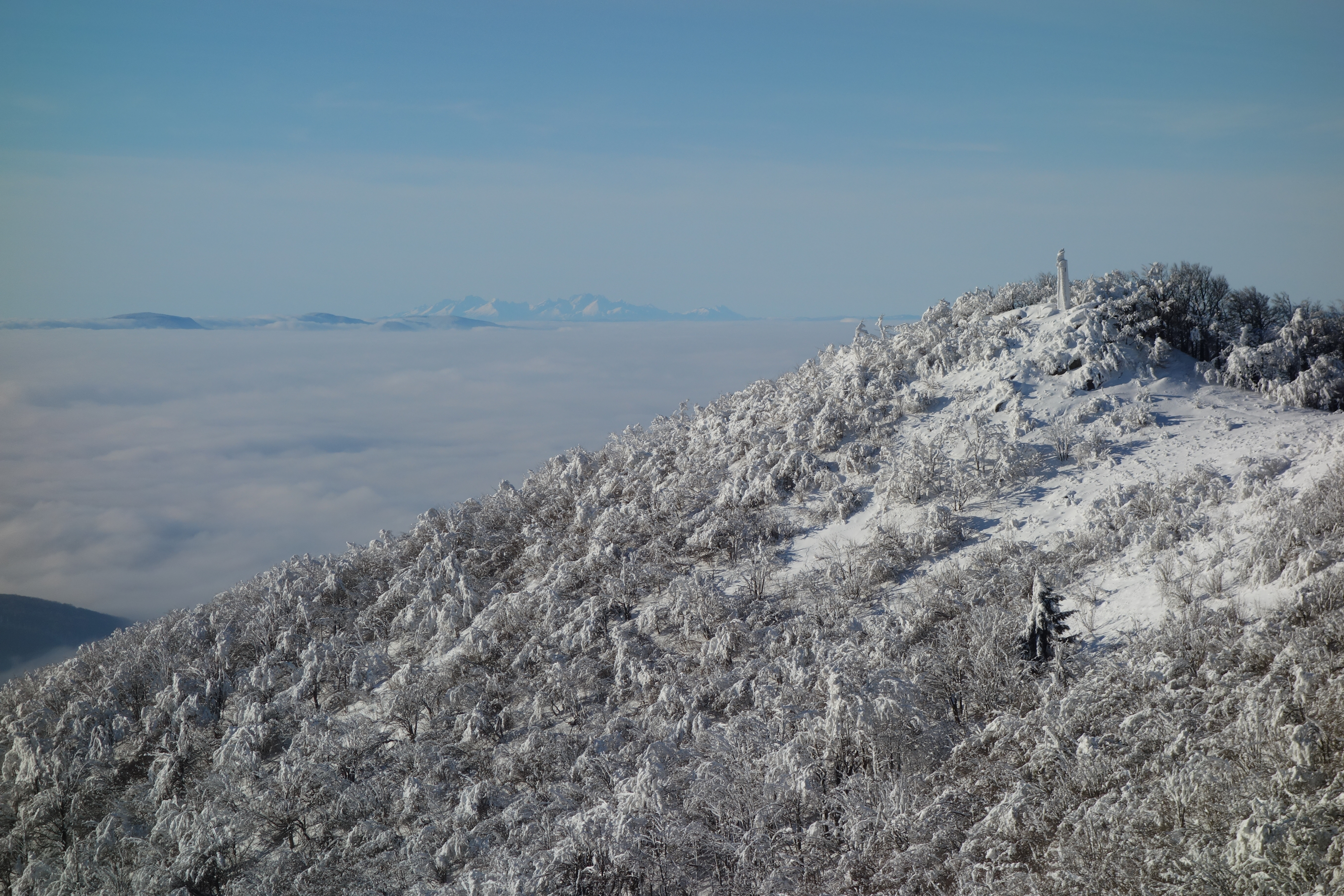
Vihorlat in winter, in the background High Tatras

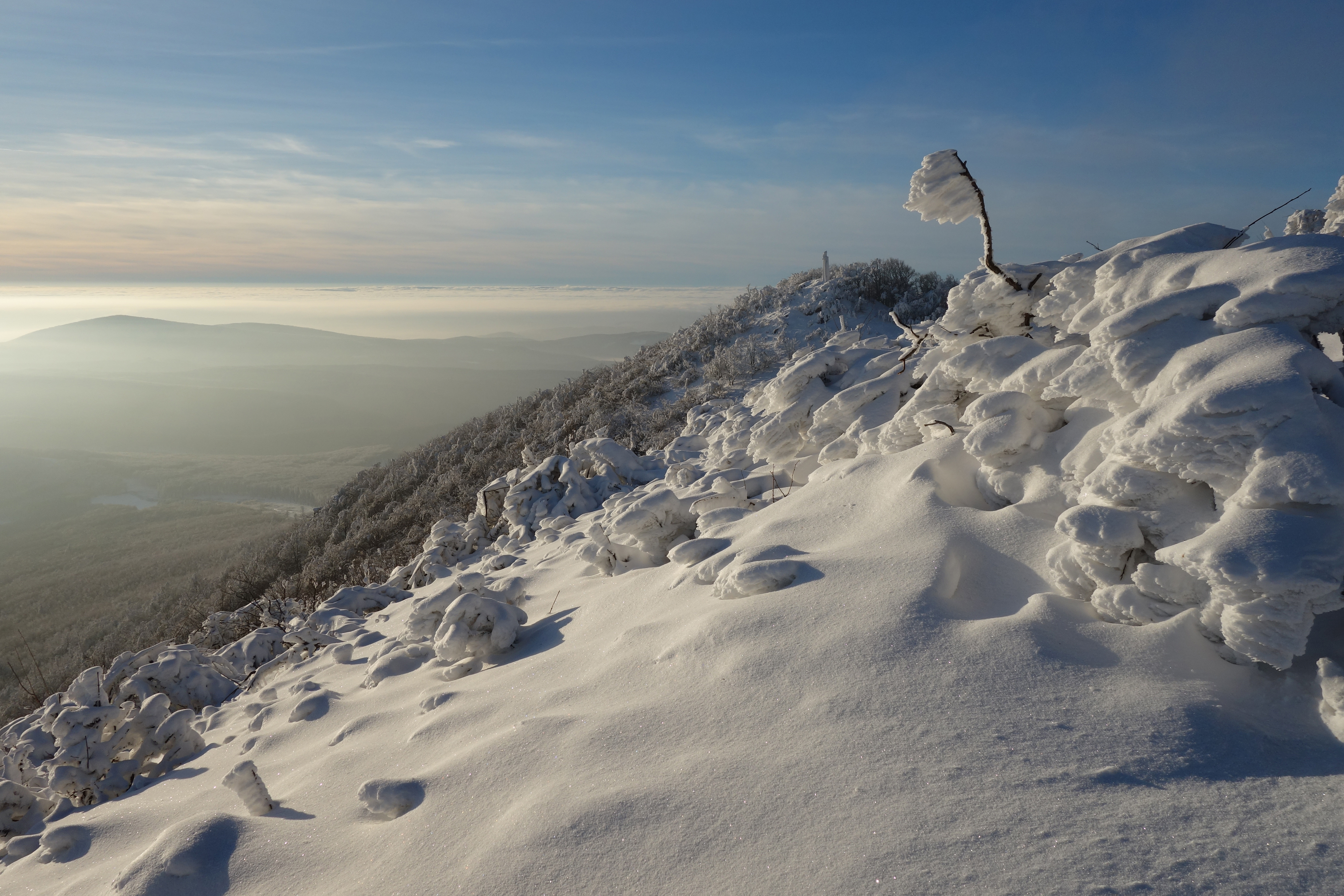
Winter in Vihorlat (left peak Kyjov)

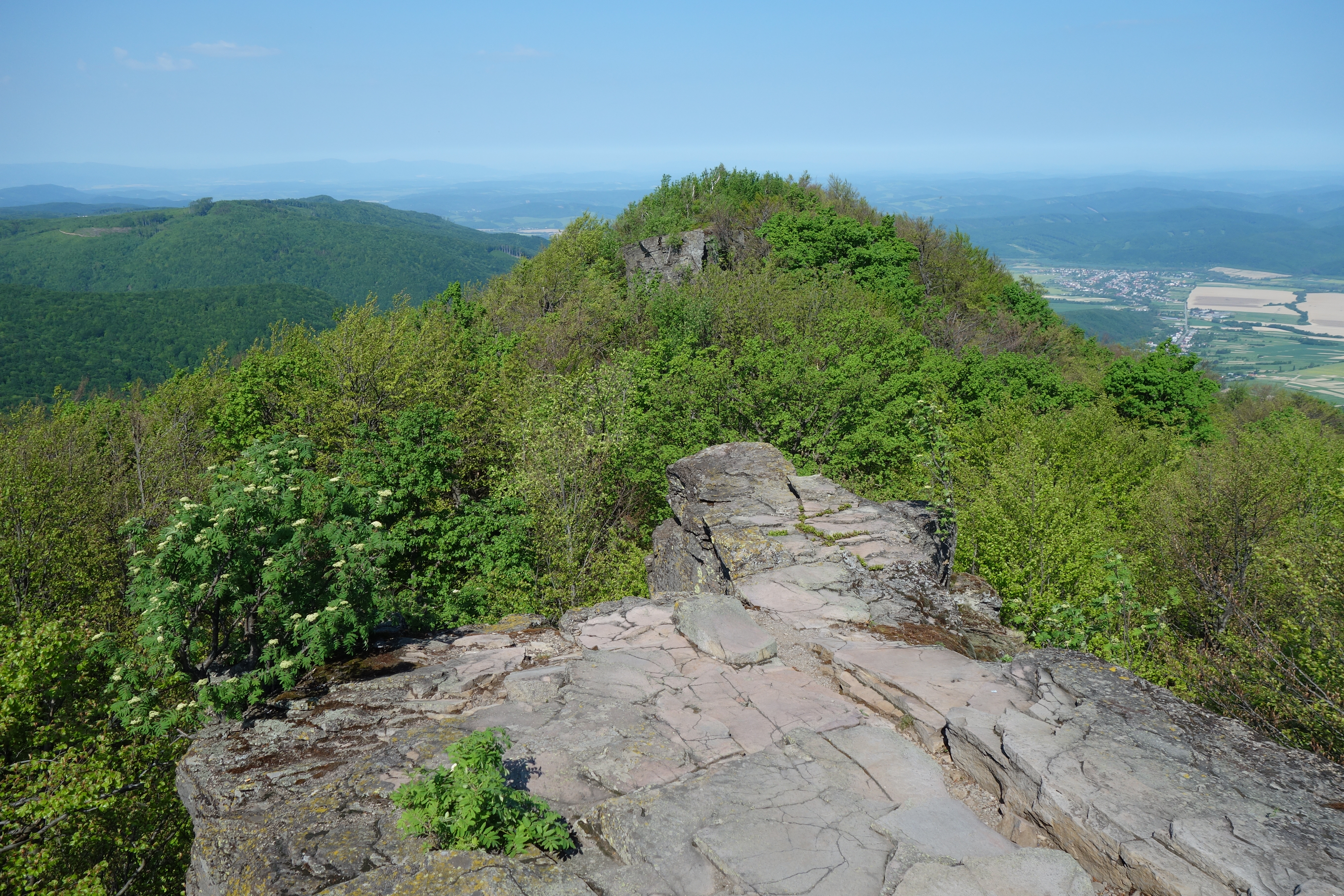
Sninský kameň (1,006 m)

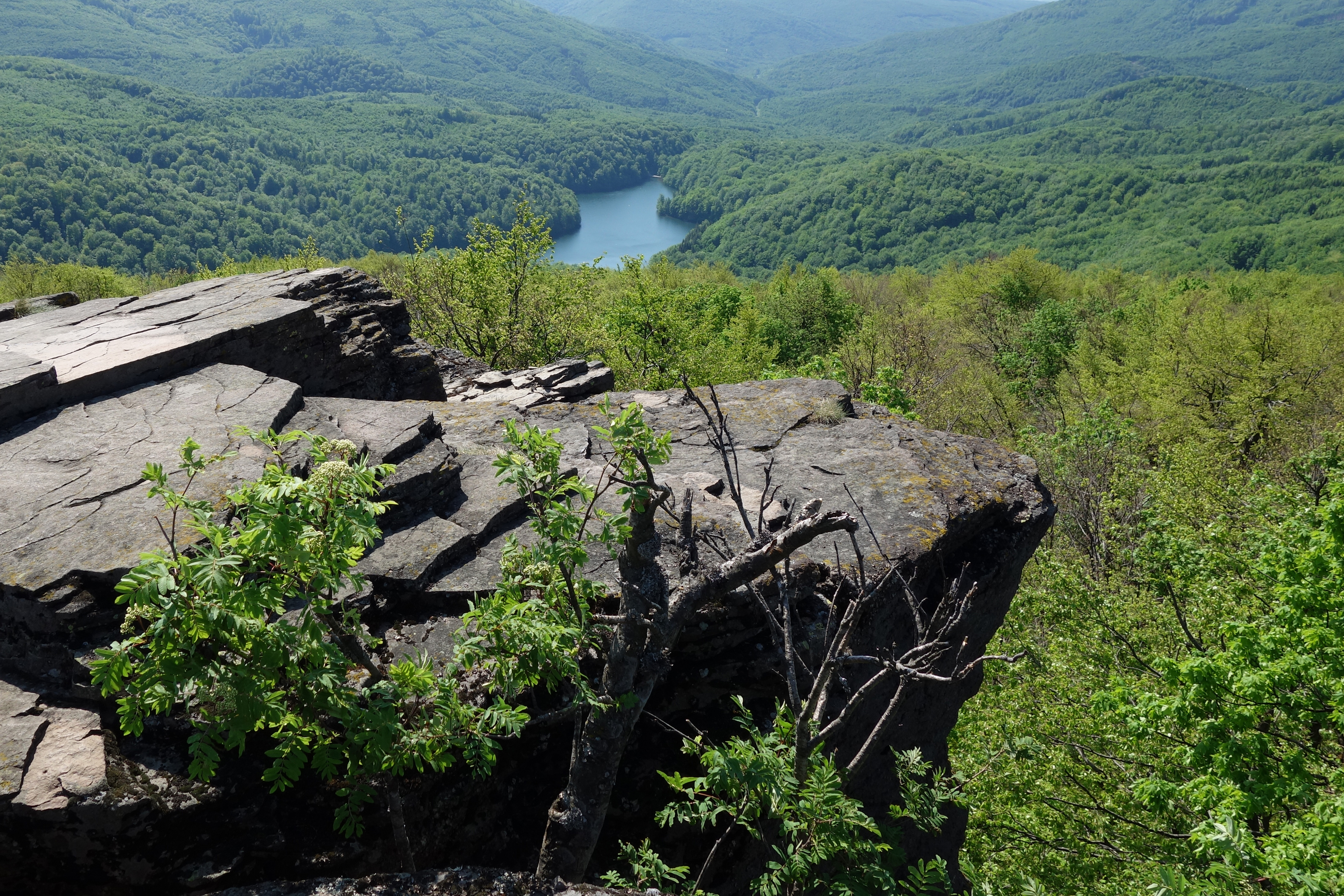
View of Morské oko from Sninský kameň

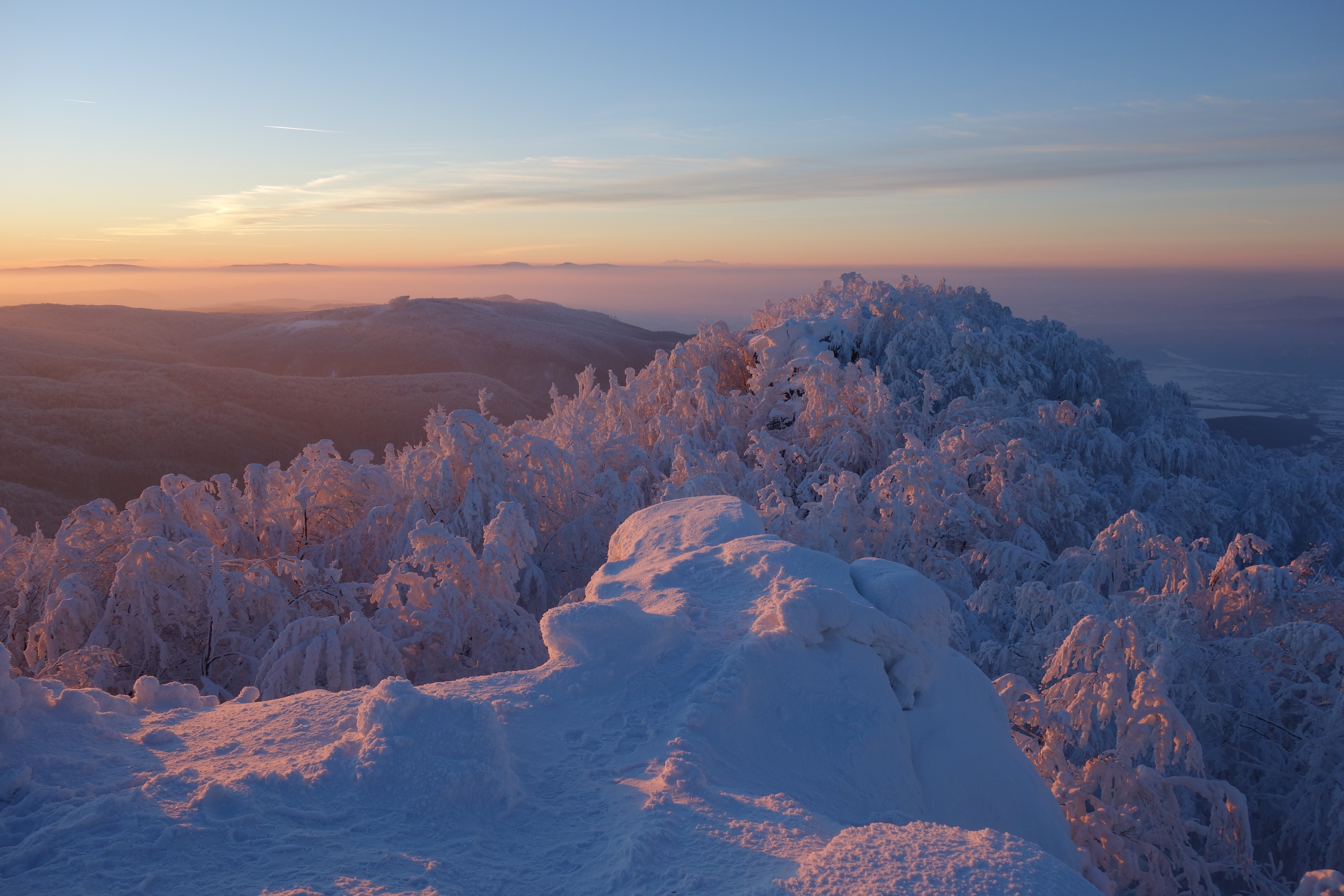
Sninský kameň in winter at sunset

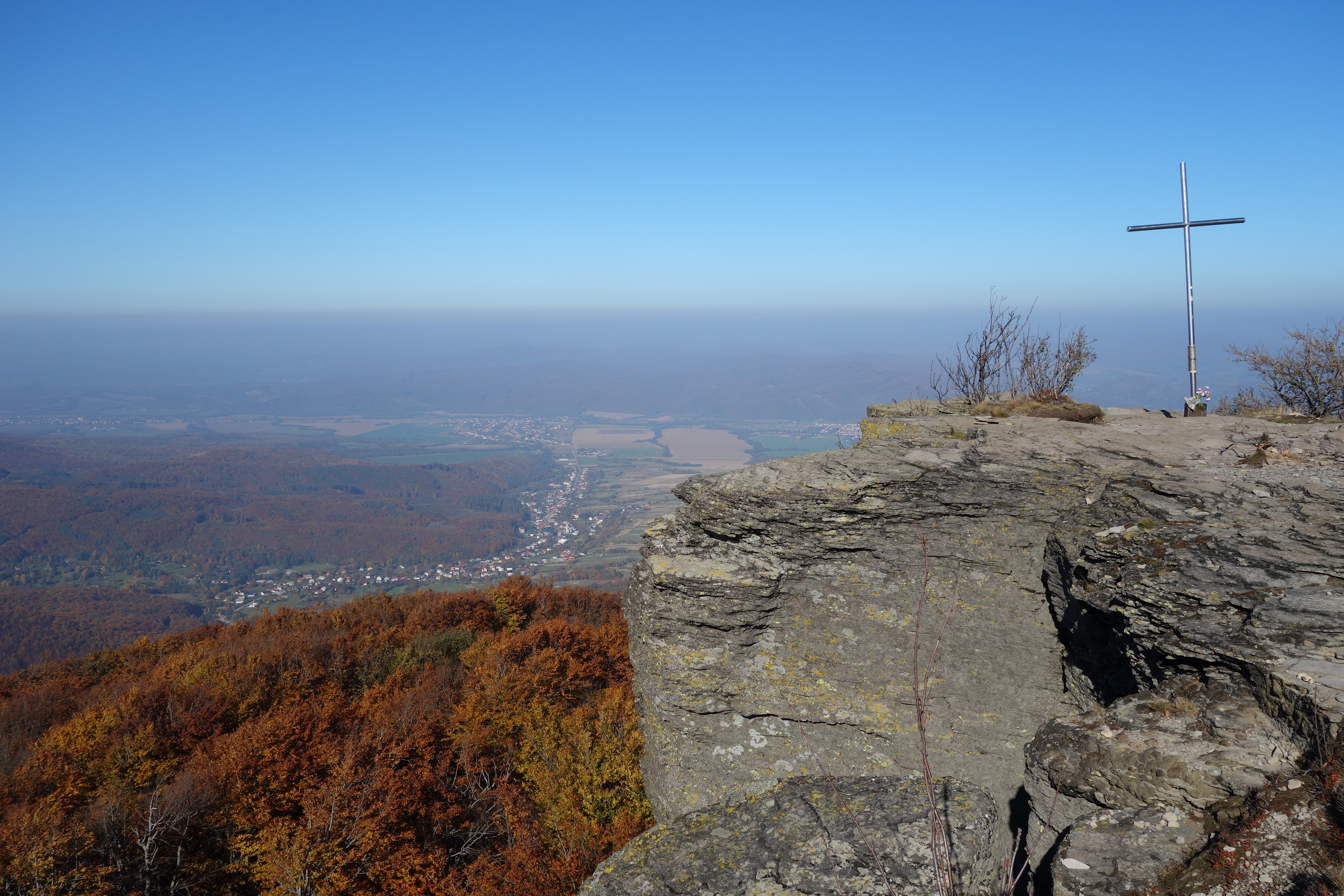
Sninský kameň in autumn

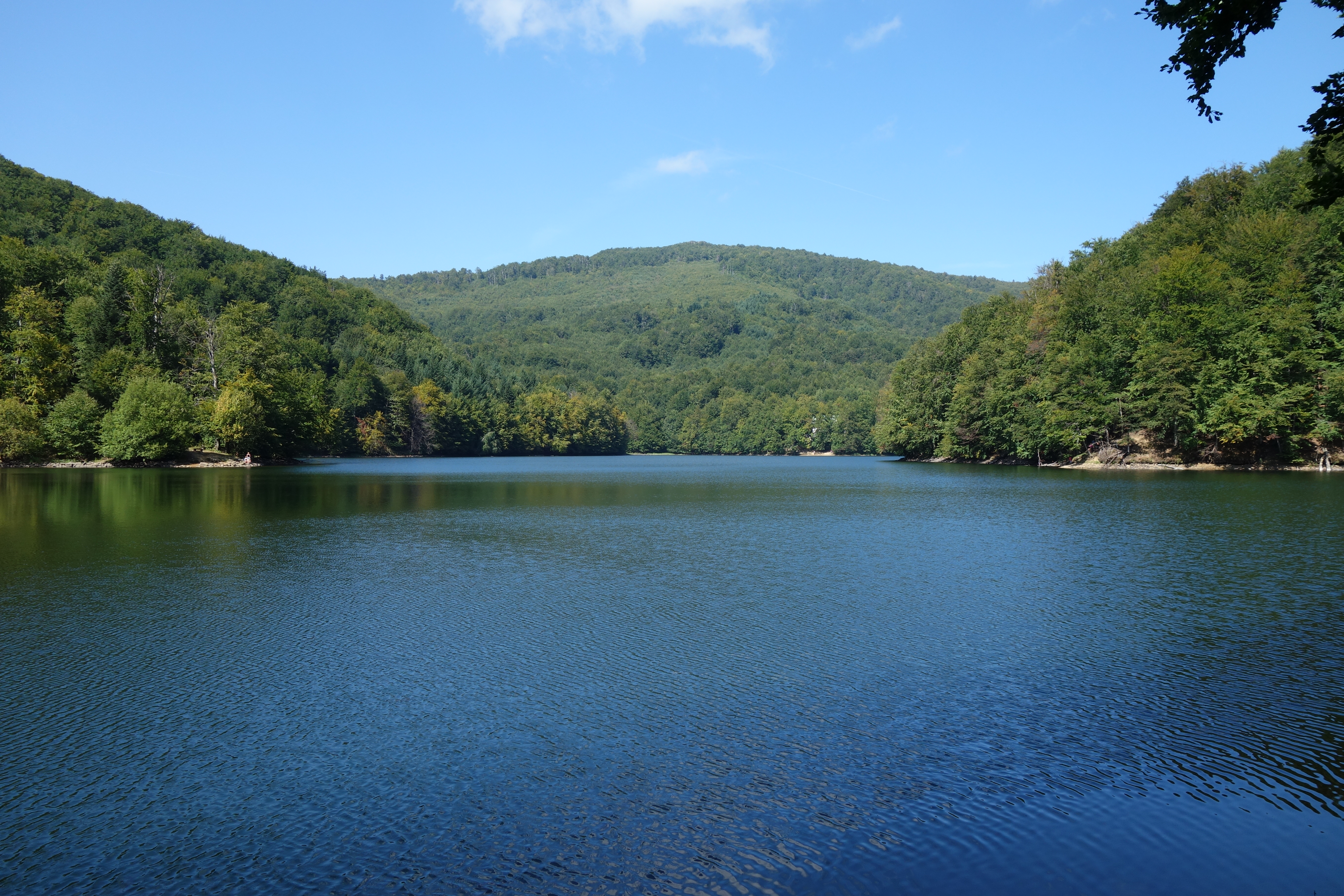
Morské oko and peak Sninský kameň

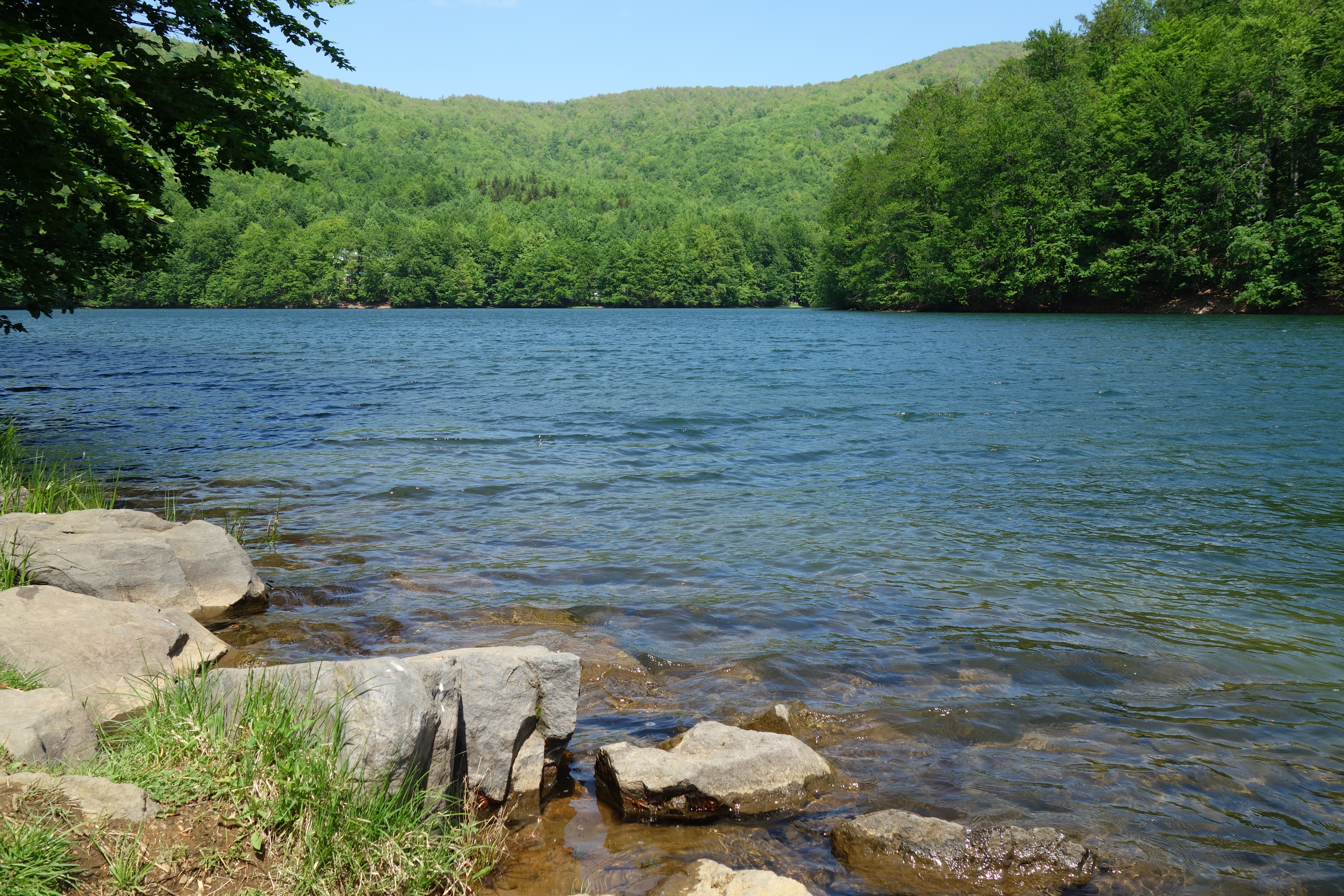
Morské oko in May

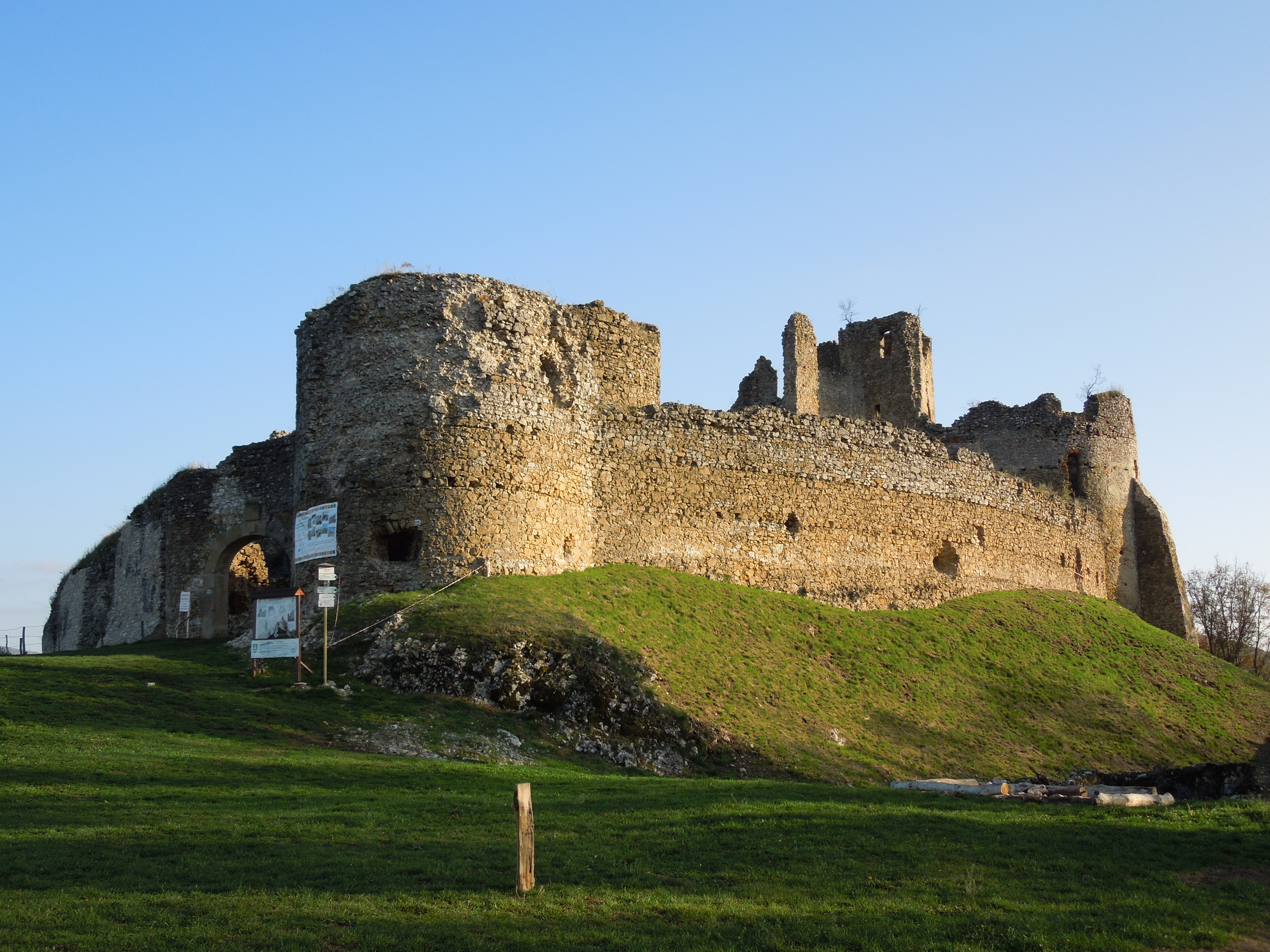
Jasenov Castle

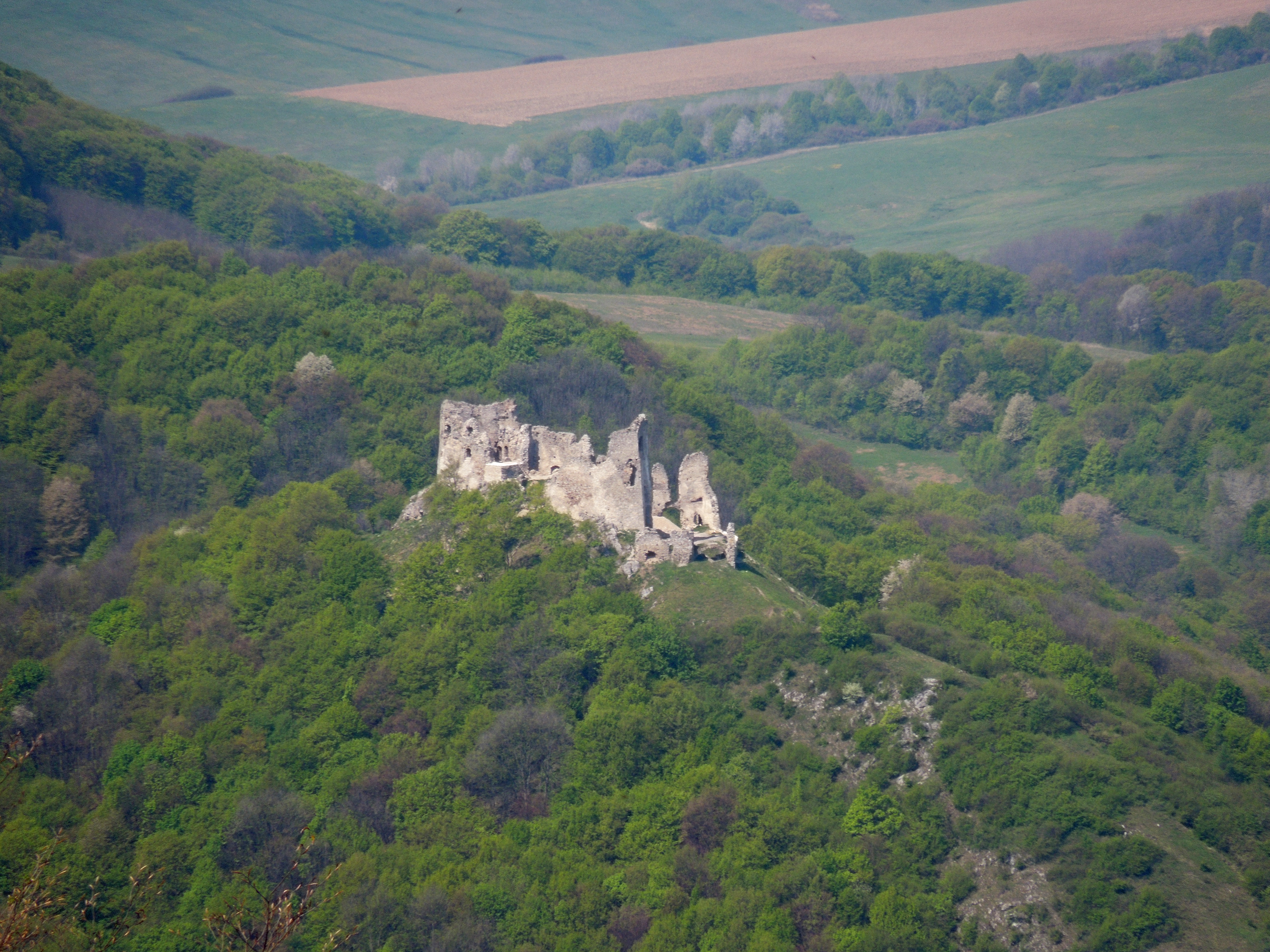
Brekov Castle

== Panorama ==
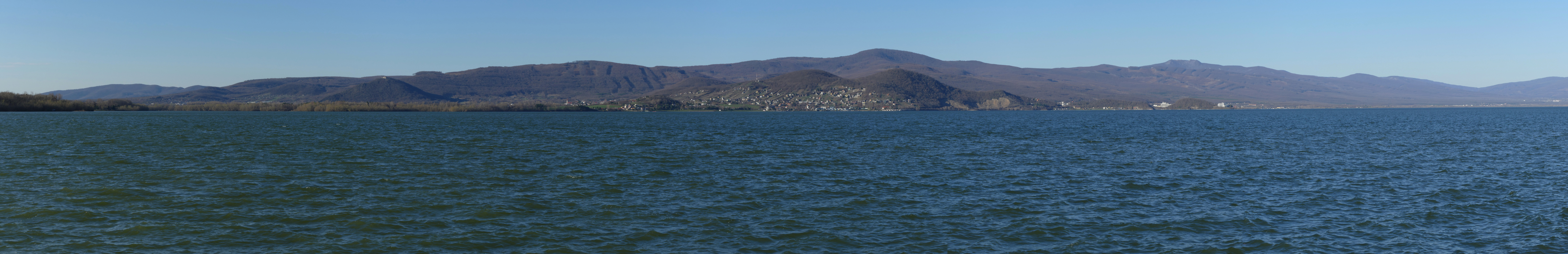
Panorama of Vihorlat Mountains (Vihorlatské vrchy) and Zemplínska šírava

== See also ==
- Vihorlat Protected Landscape Area
- Morské oko
