= Morské oko (Slovakia) =

Lake in Slovakia

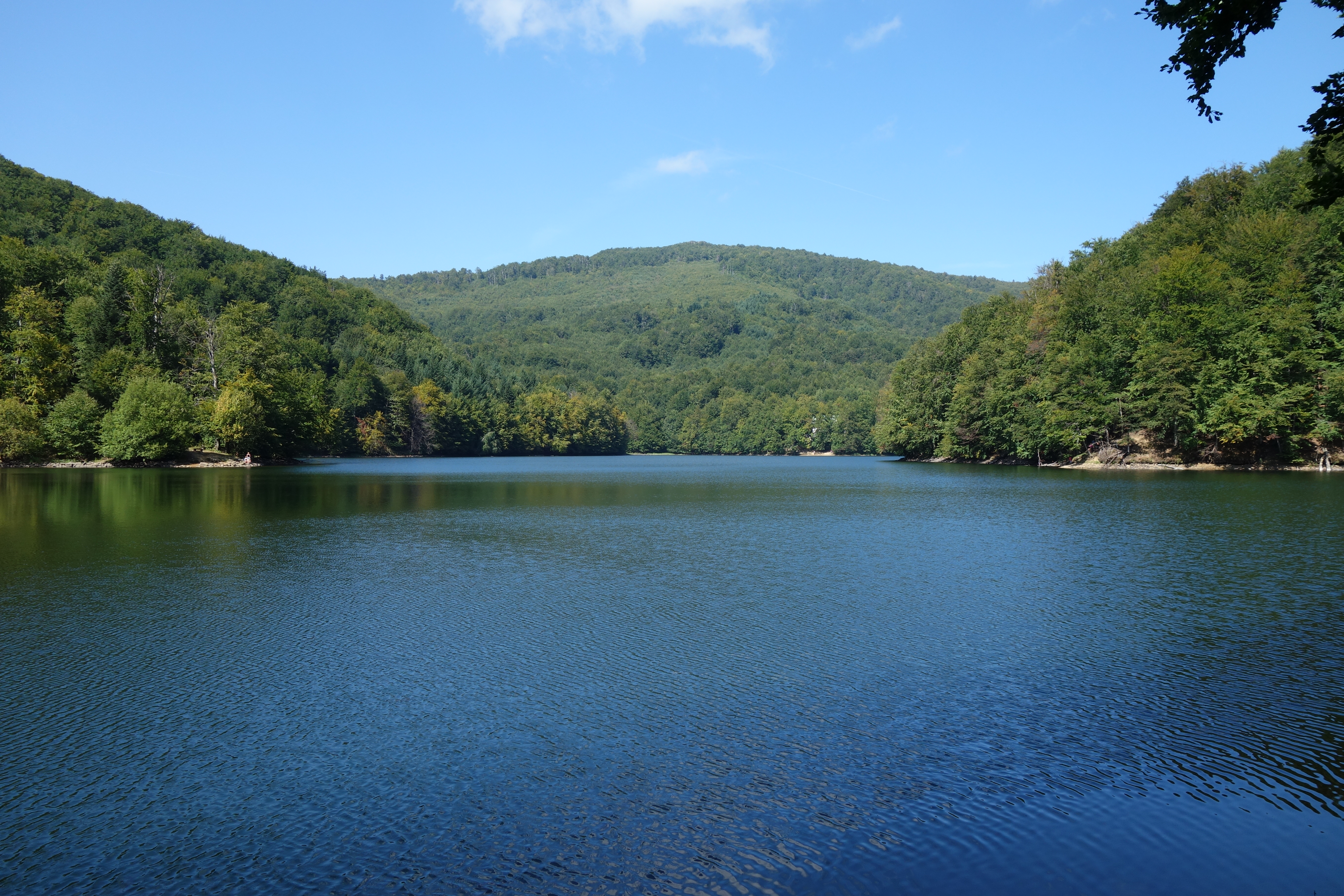

- Location within Slovakia
- Location: Vihorlat Mountains
- Coordinates: 48°54′56″N 22°11′54″E
- Basin countries: Slovakia
- Surface area: 13 ha (32 acres)
- Max. depth: 25.1 m (82 ft)
- Surface elevation: 618 m (2,028 ft)

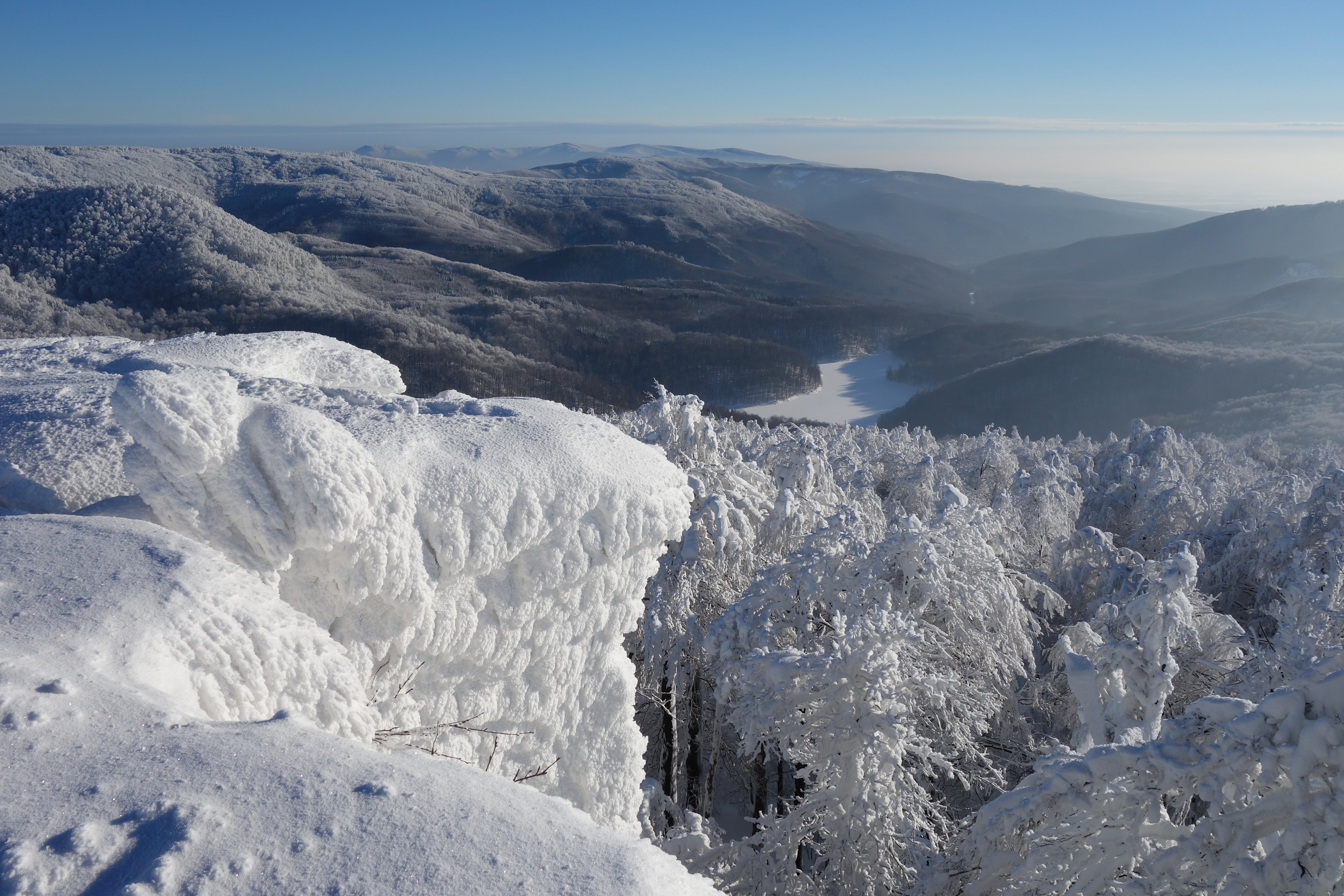
View of Morské oko from Sninský kameň in winter

Morské oko (called Veľké Vihorlatské jazero in the past; literally "Eye of the sea") is a lake in the Vihorlat Mountains in eastern Slovakia. It is the largest non karst lake and the third biggest natural lake in Slovakia. It is at an altitude of 618 m, covers 0.13 km² with a maximum depth of 25.1 m. It is drained by the river Okna, whose valley was dammed approximately three thousand years ago by a massive landslide from the eastern slopes of Motrogon and Jedlinka.

The oldest known description of the lake can be found on two maps, dating back to 1687. The earliest official name of the lake known as Blatné jazero (germ. Blatto teich) dates back to 1784. The name Veľké Vihorlatské jazero was introduced in 1933.

The lake itself is a natural home to 8 species of fish. The native species consist of the brown trout (Salmo trutta m. fario), common minnow (Phoxinus phoxinus) and stone loach (Barbatula barbatula). In the past, rainbow trout (Oncorhynchus mykiss) was introduced into the lake, but the prevailing species today is the common chub (Squalius cephalus).

It is a national nature reserve (covering 1.08 km²) since 1984 and part of the Vihorlat Protected Landscape Area.

== Gallery ==
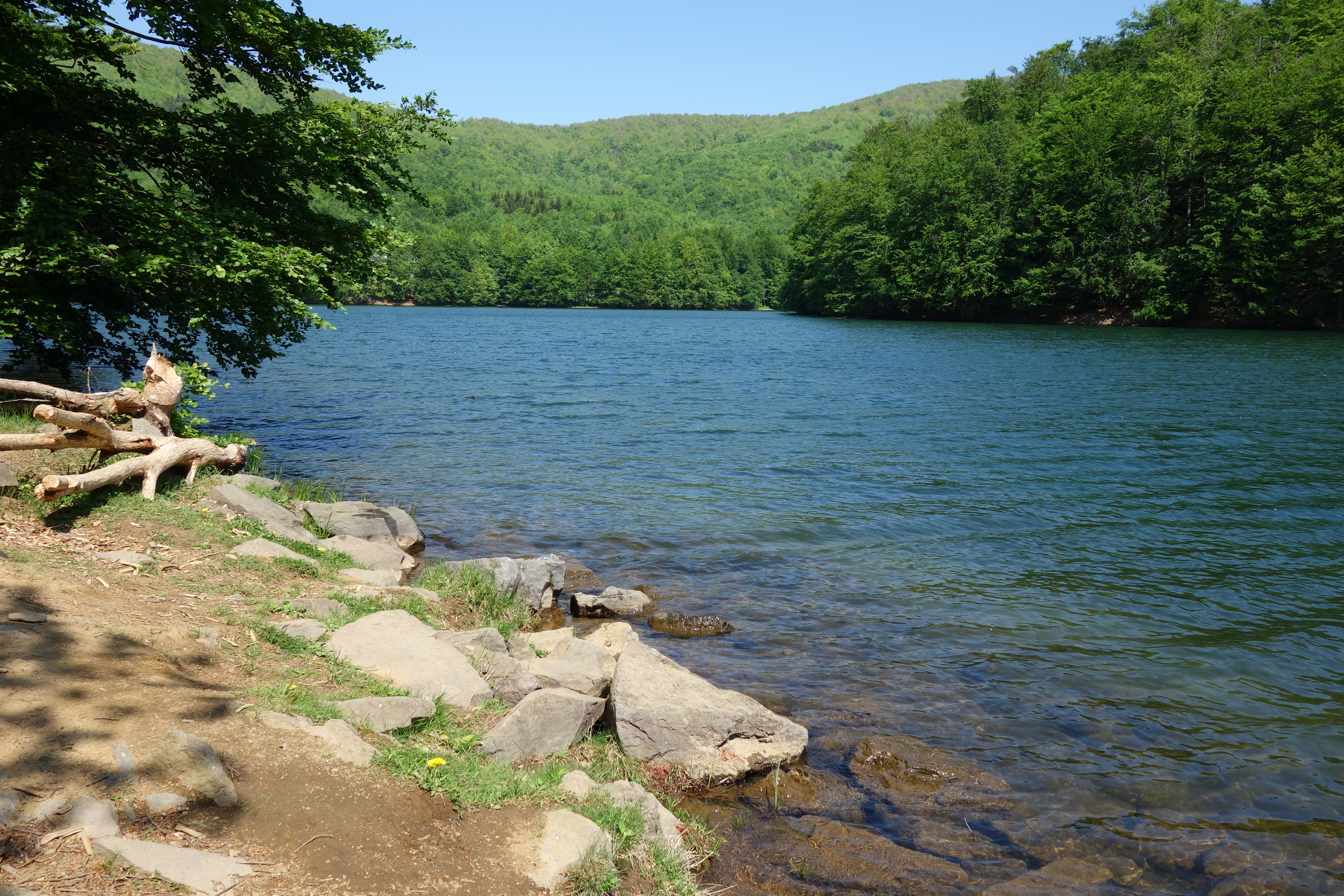

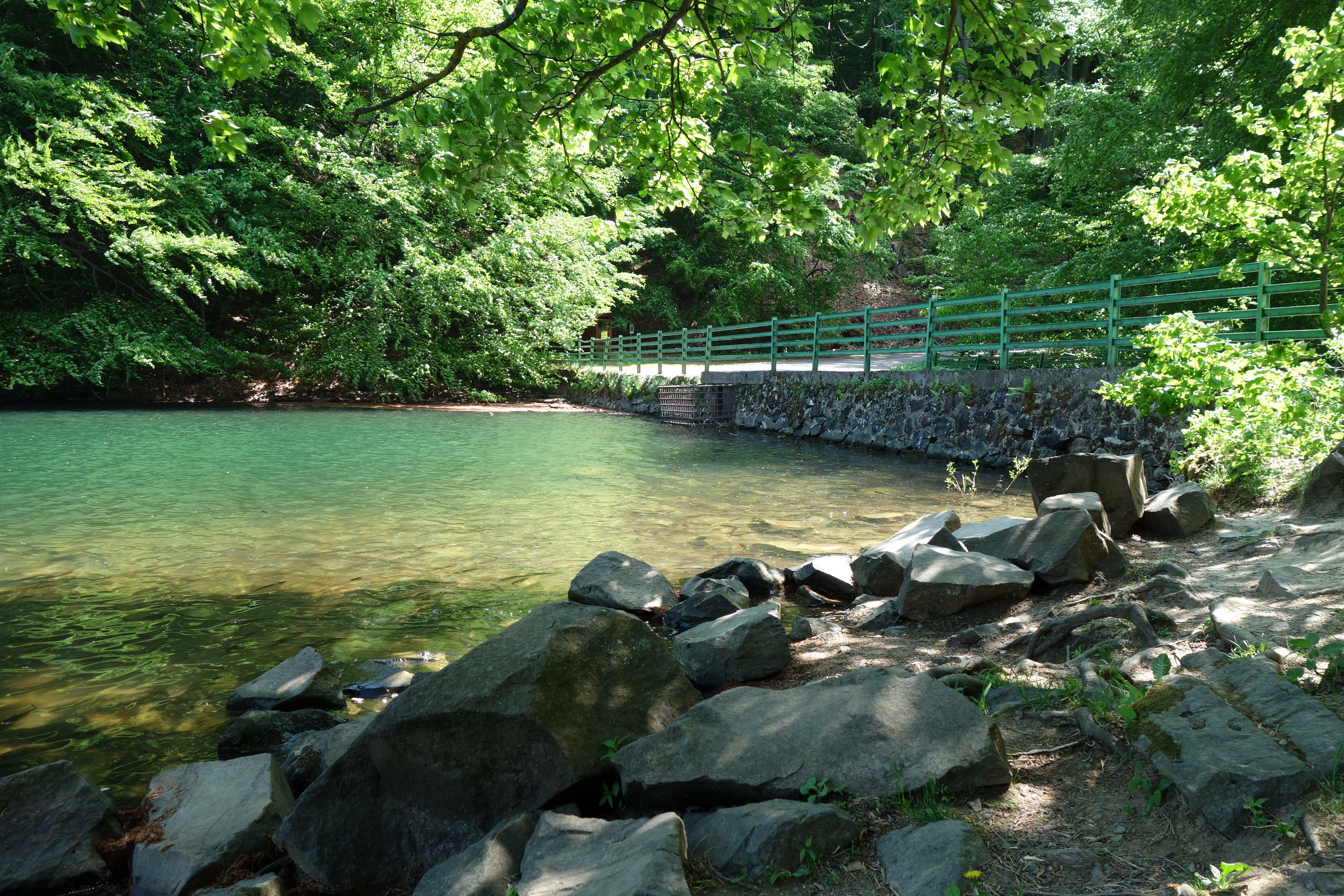

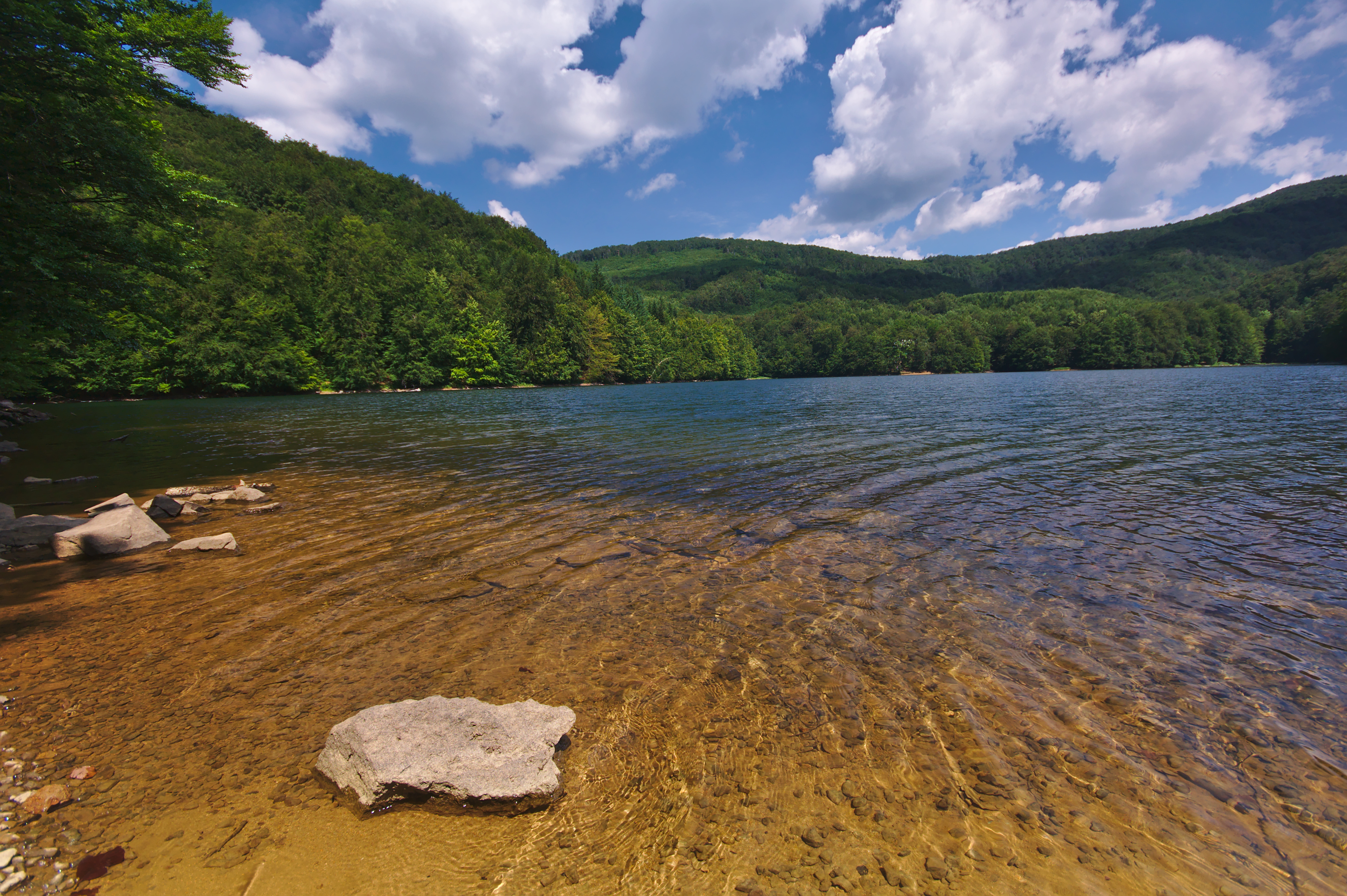

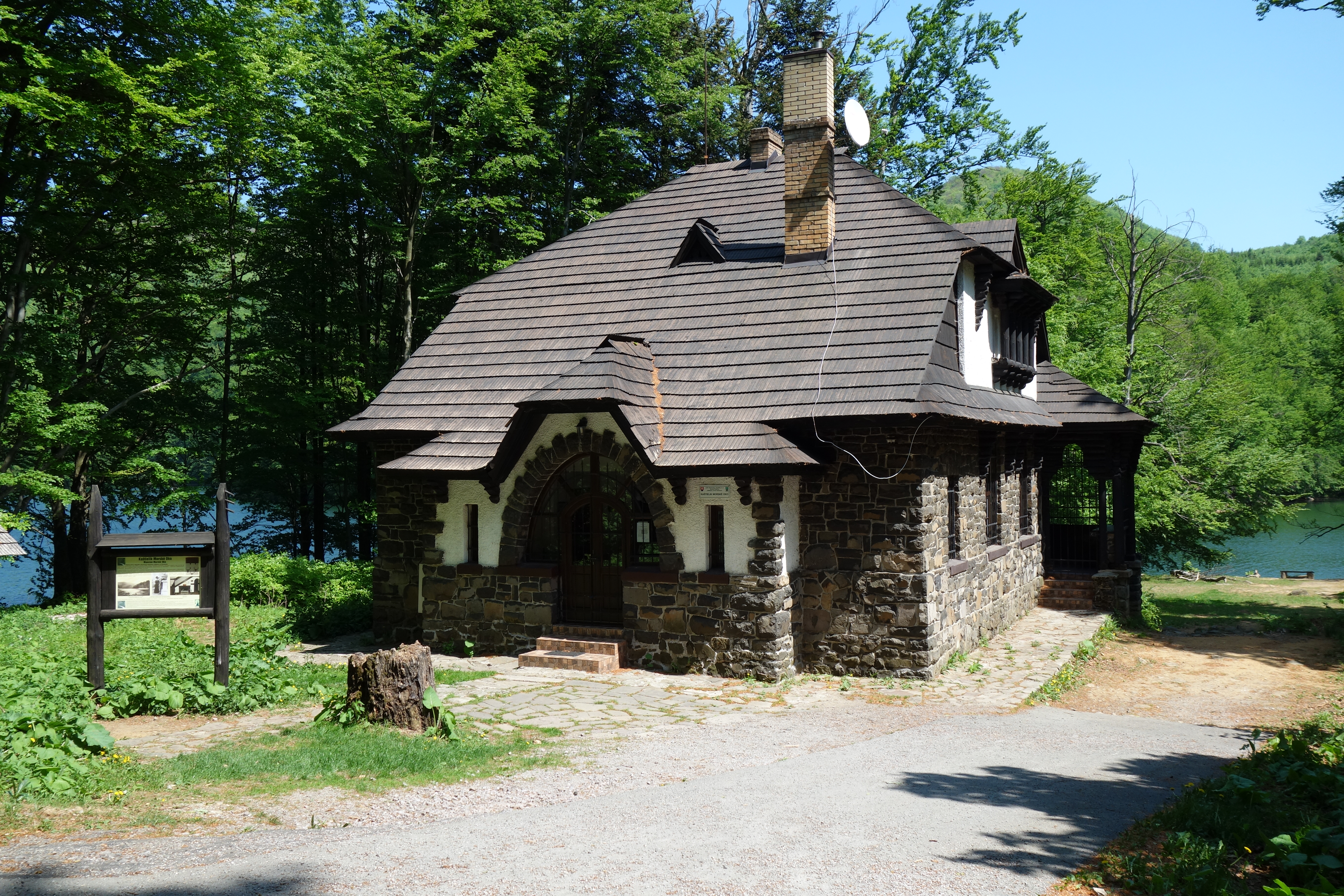
Mansion Morské oko, built in 1924 for Gladys Vanderbilt Széchenyi

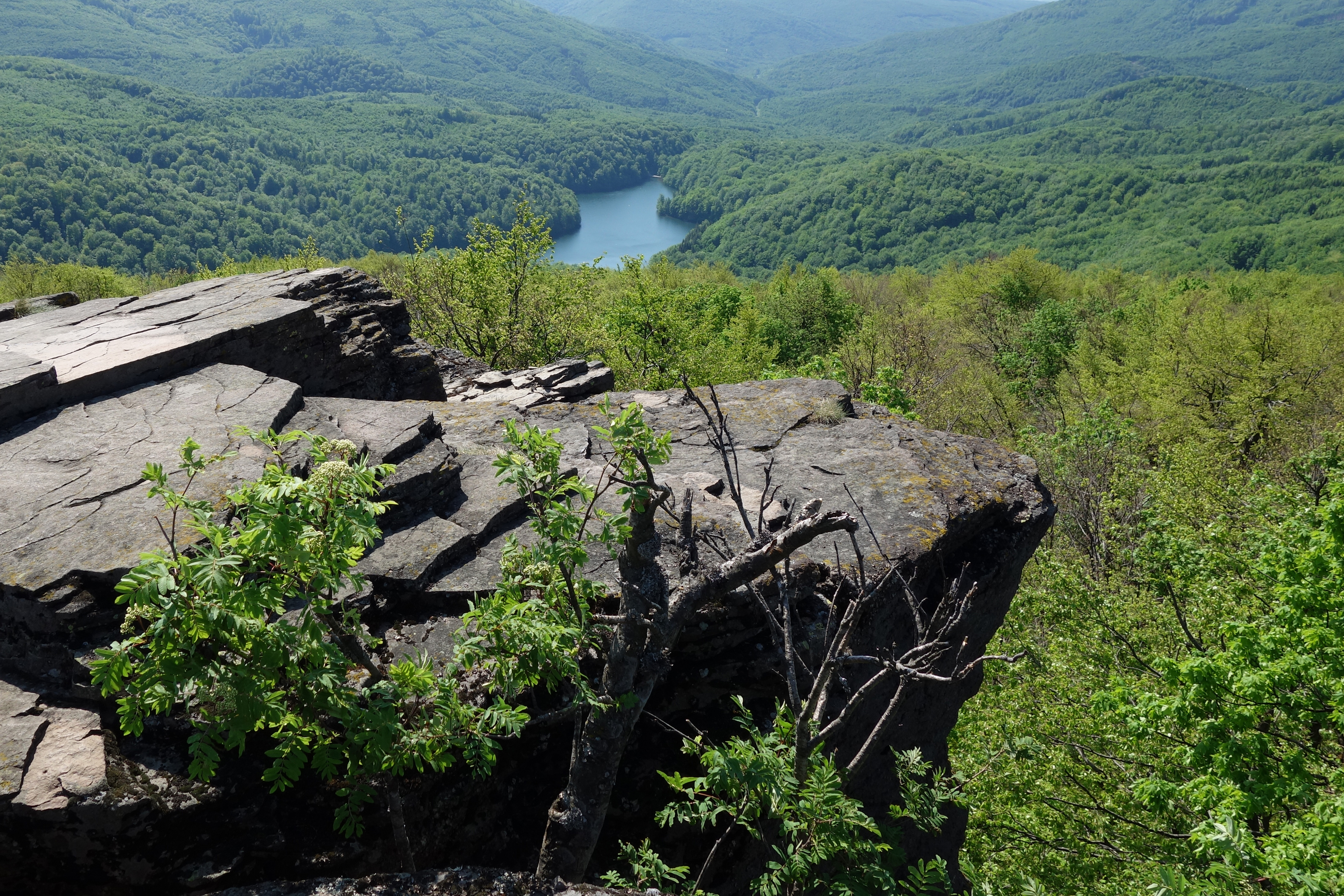
View of Morské oko from Sninský kameň in spring

== See also ==
- Protected areas of Slovakia
- List of lakes of Slovakia
