= Vihorlat Protected Landscape Area =

Protected landscape area of Slovakia

Vihorlat Protected Landscape Area CHKO Vihorlat
- IUCN category V (protected landscape/seascape)
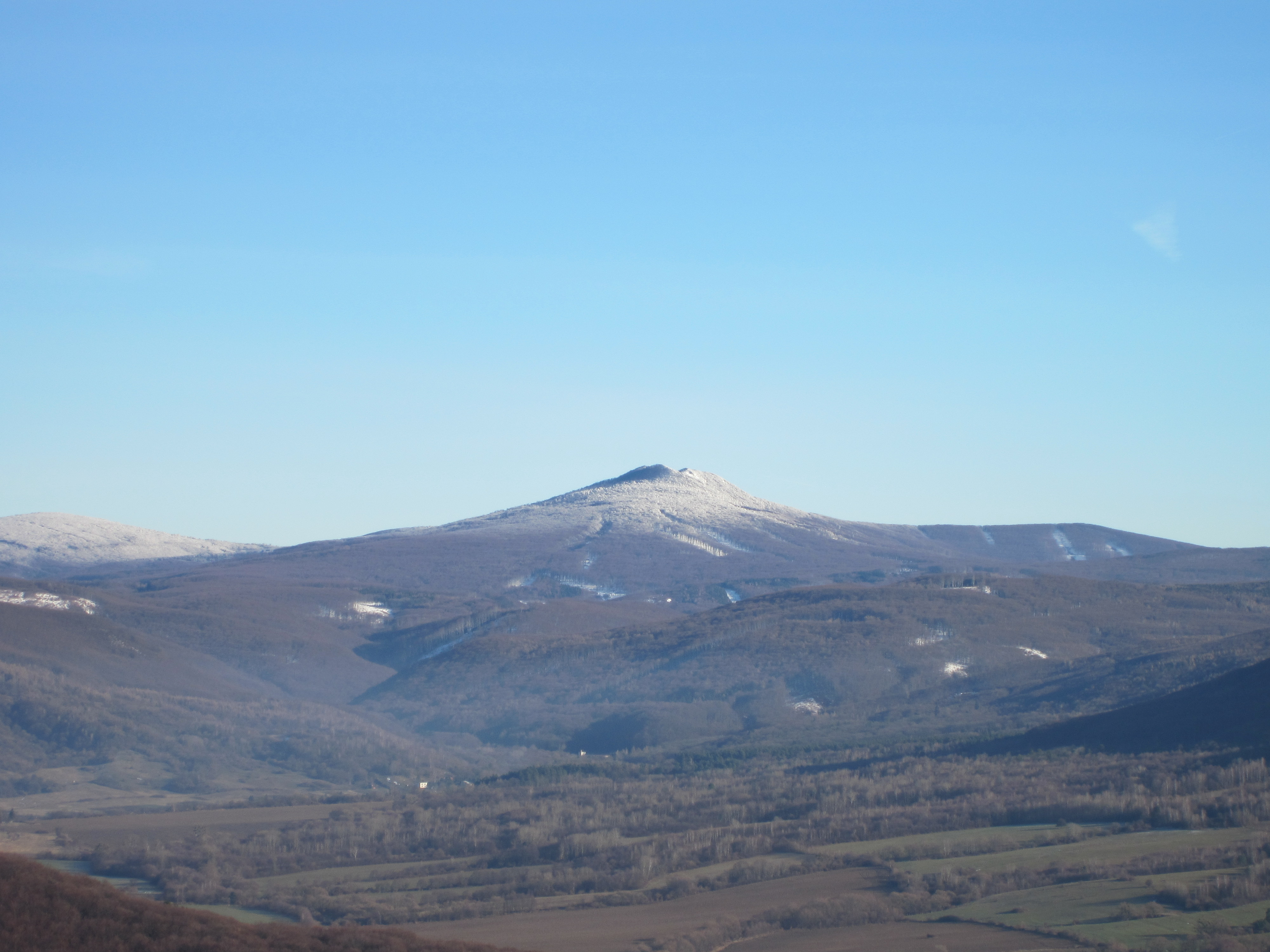
- Interactive map of Vihorlat Protected Landscape Area; CHKO Vihorlat
- Location: Eastern Slovakia
- Coordinates: 48°55′N 22°10′E
- Area: 174.85 km^{2} (67.51 sq mi)
- Established: 28 December 1973
- Governing body: Správa CHKO Vihorlat (Vihorlat PLA administration) in Michalovce

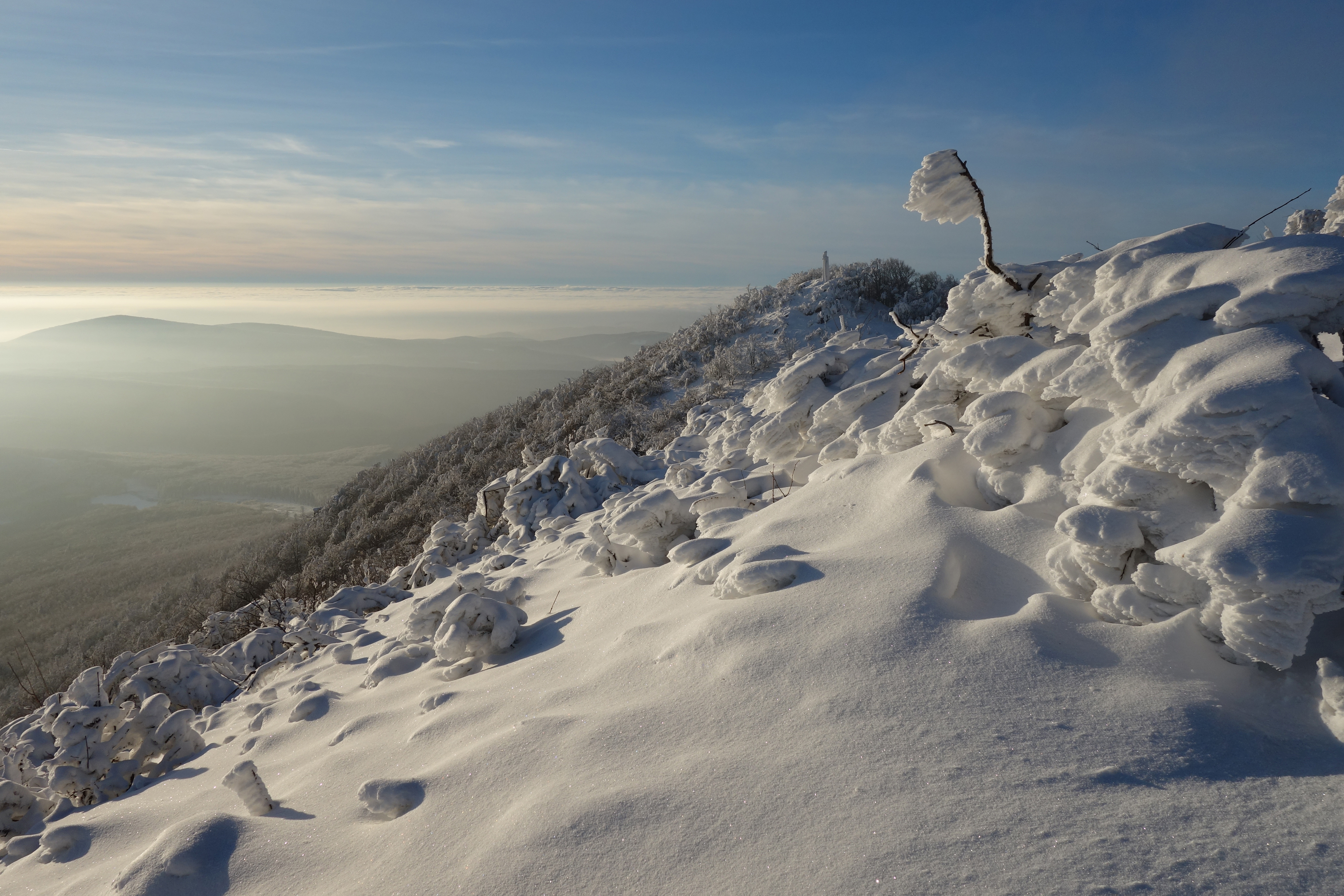
Winter in Vihorlat (1,076 m)

Vihorlat Protected Landscape Area (Slovak: Chránená krajinná oblasť Vihorlat,) is one of 14 protected landscape areas in Slovakia. The Landscape Area is in the middle part of the Vihorlatské vrchy mountains, in eastern Slovakia. It is in the Humenné, Sobrance and Snina districts.

== History ==
The park was created on 28 December 1973 and the law creating it was amended on 19 April 1999.

== Geography, geology and biology ==
The area of the Vihorlat Mountains is of volcanic origin. Beech, oak, ash, maple, and fir trees are most common in Vihorlat. The area contains about 2,000 species of invertebrates and 100 species of birds. Notable species include Eurasian lynx, wildcat, gray wolf, otter, black stork, Ural owl, lesser spotted eagle, and Eurasian eagle-owl. A curiosity in the park is the Morské oko (literally 'Sea Eye') Lake.

== Gallery ==
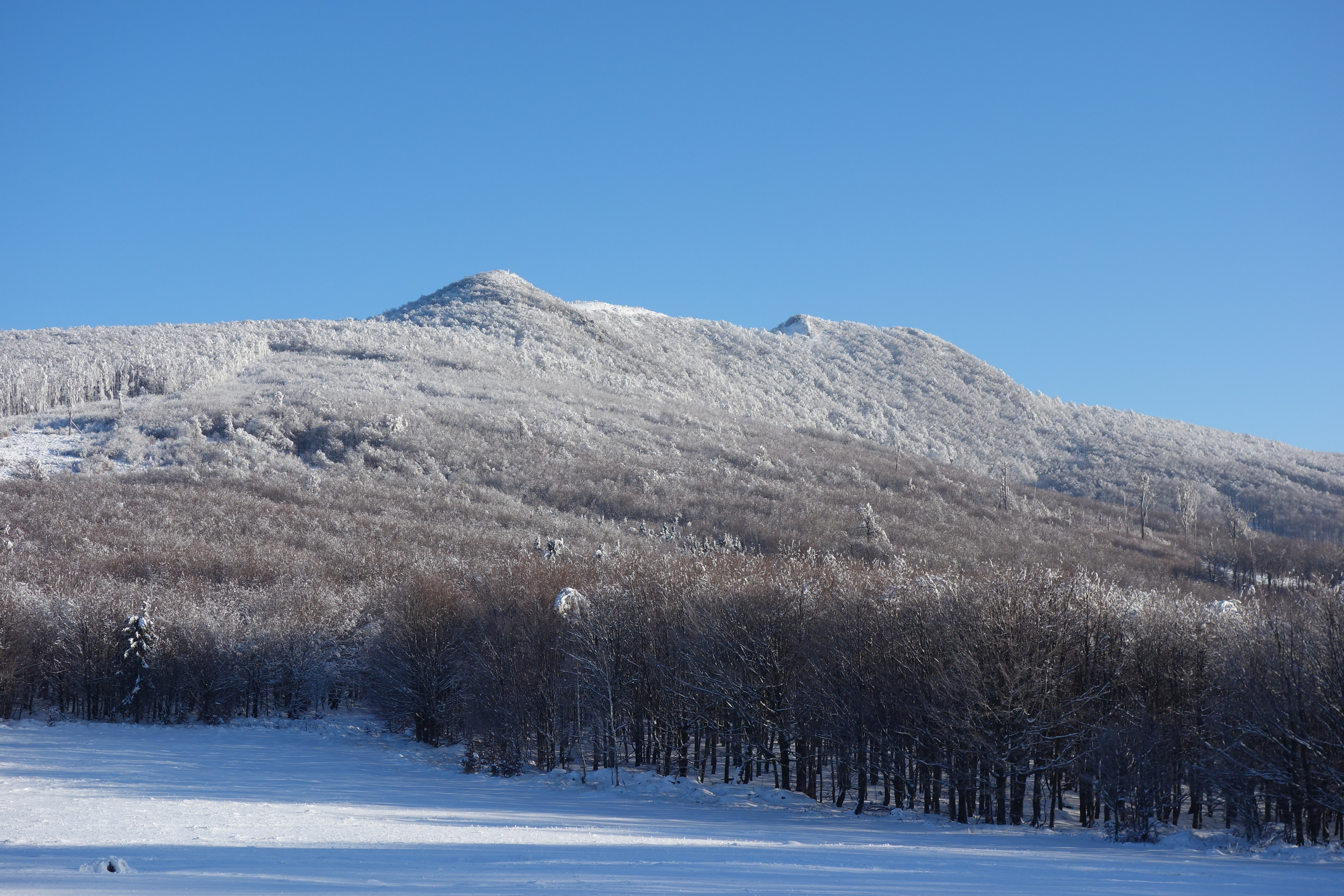
Vihorlat (1,076 m), the highest mountain of Vihorlat Mountains

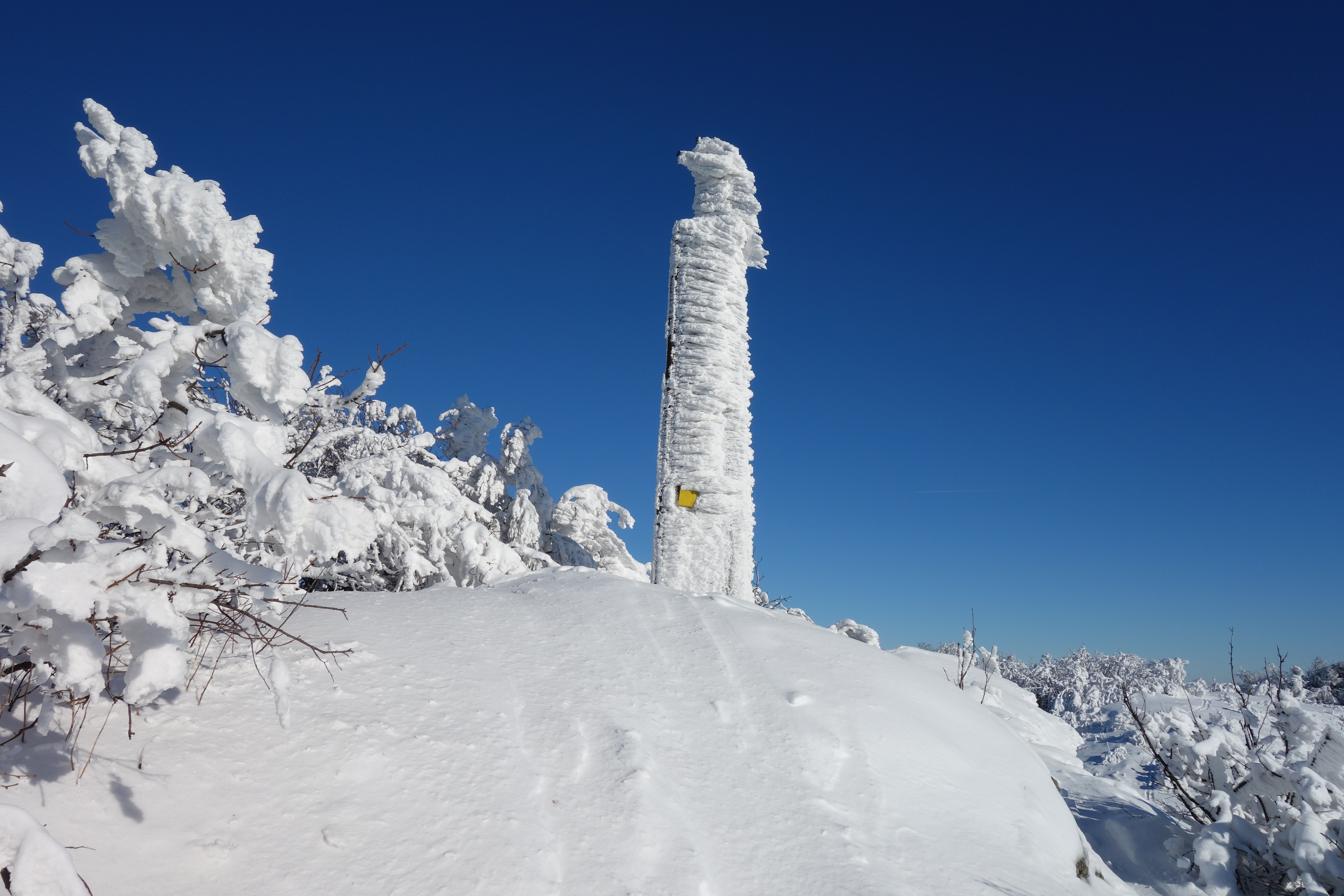
Pylon on top of Vihorlat with rime

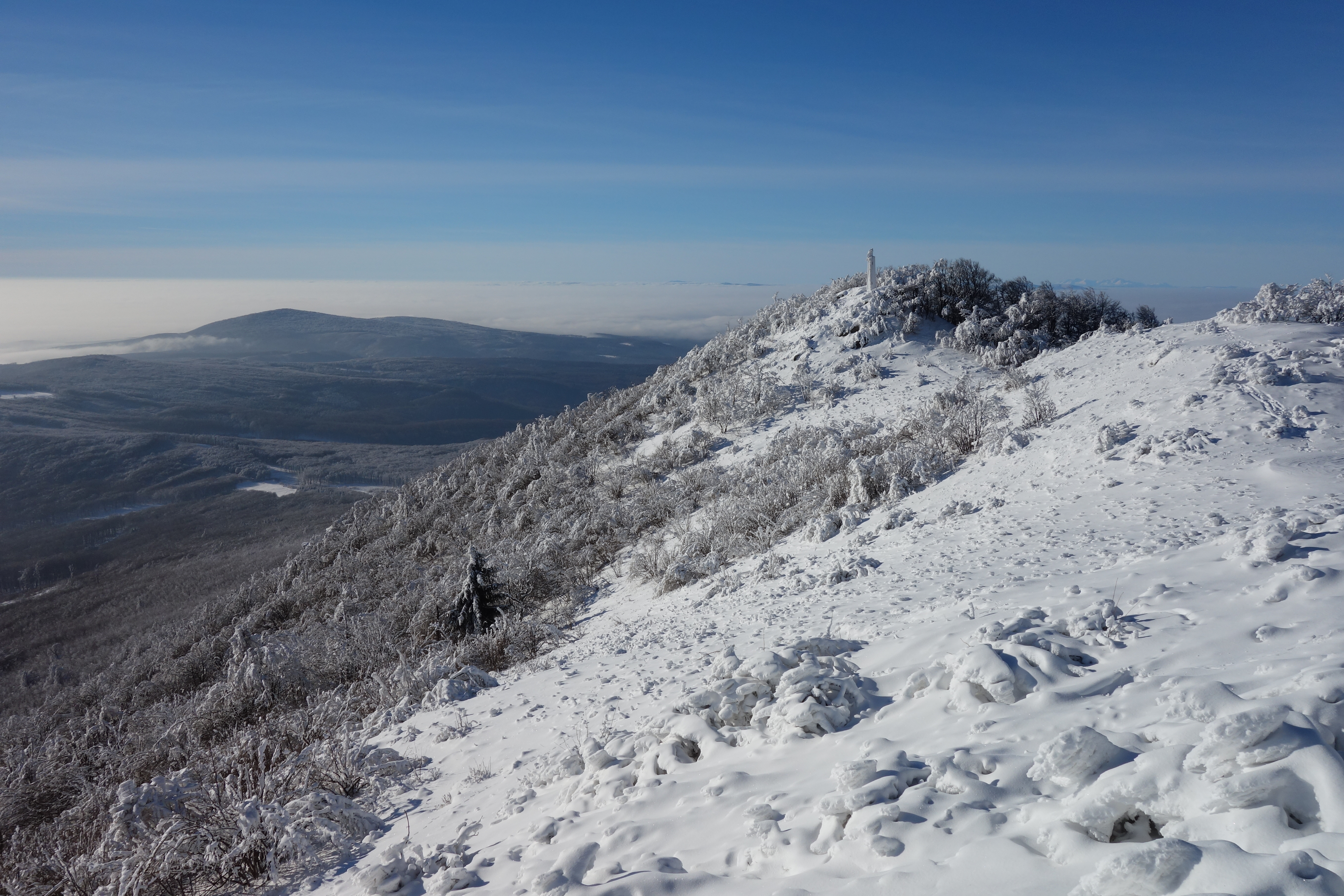
Winter in Vihorlat (left peak Kyjov)

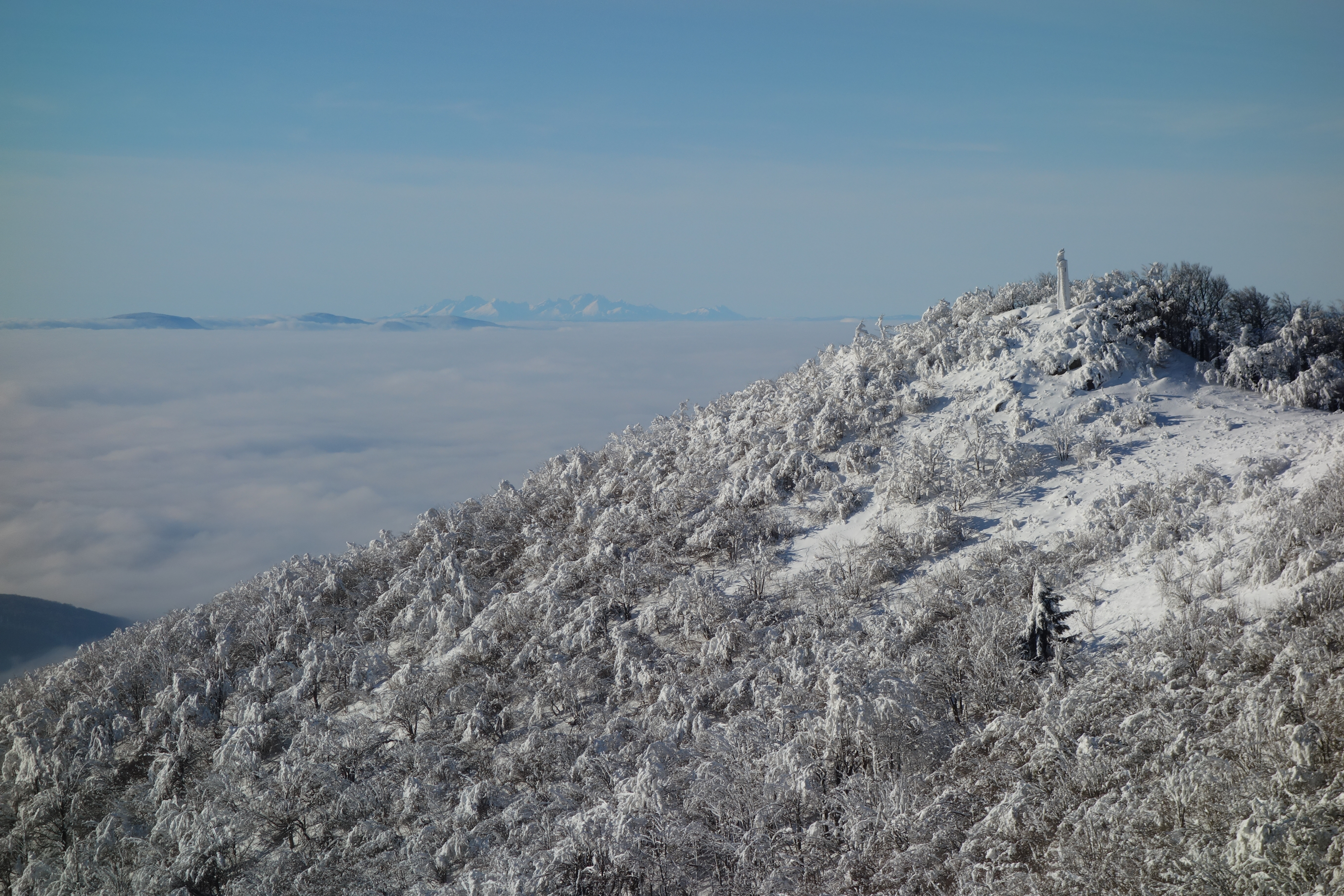
Vihorlat in winter, in the background High Tatras

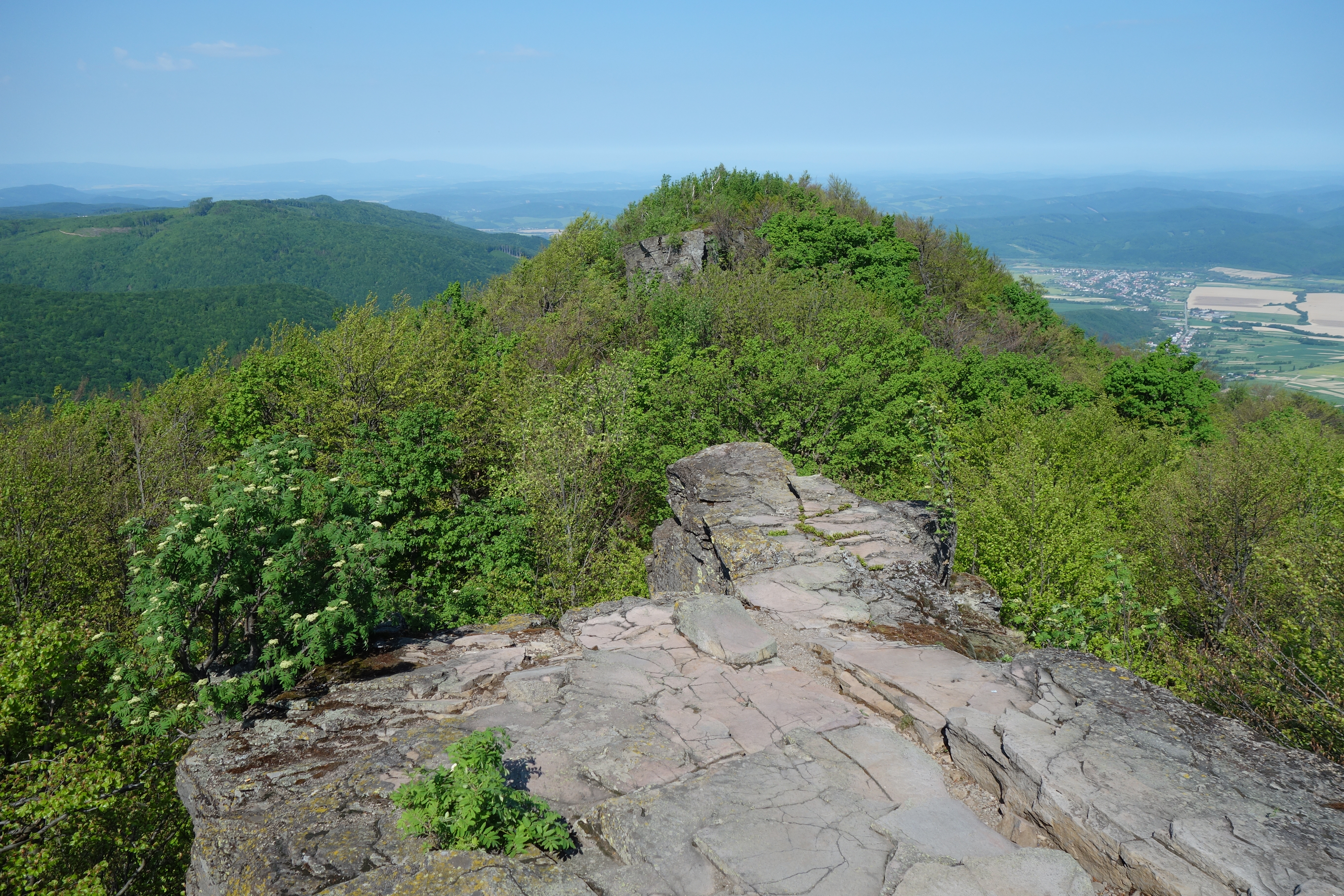
Sninský kameň (1,006 m)

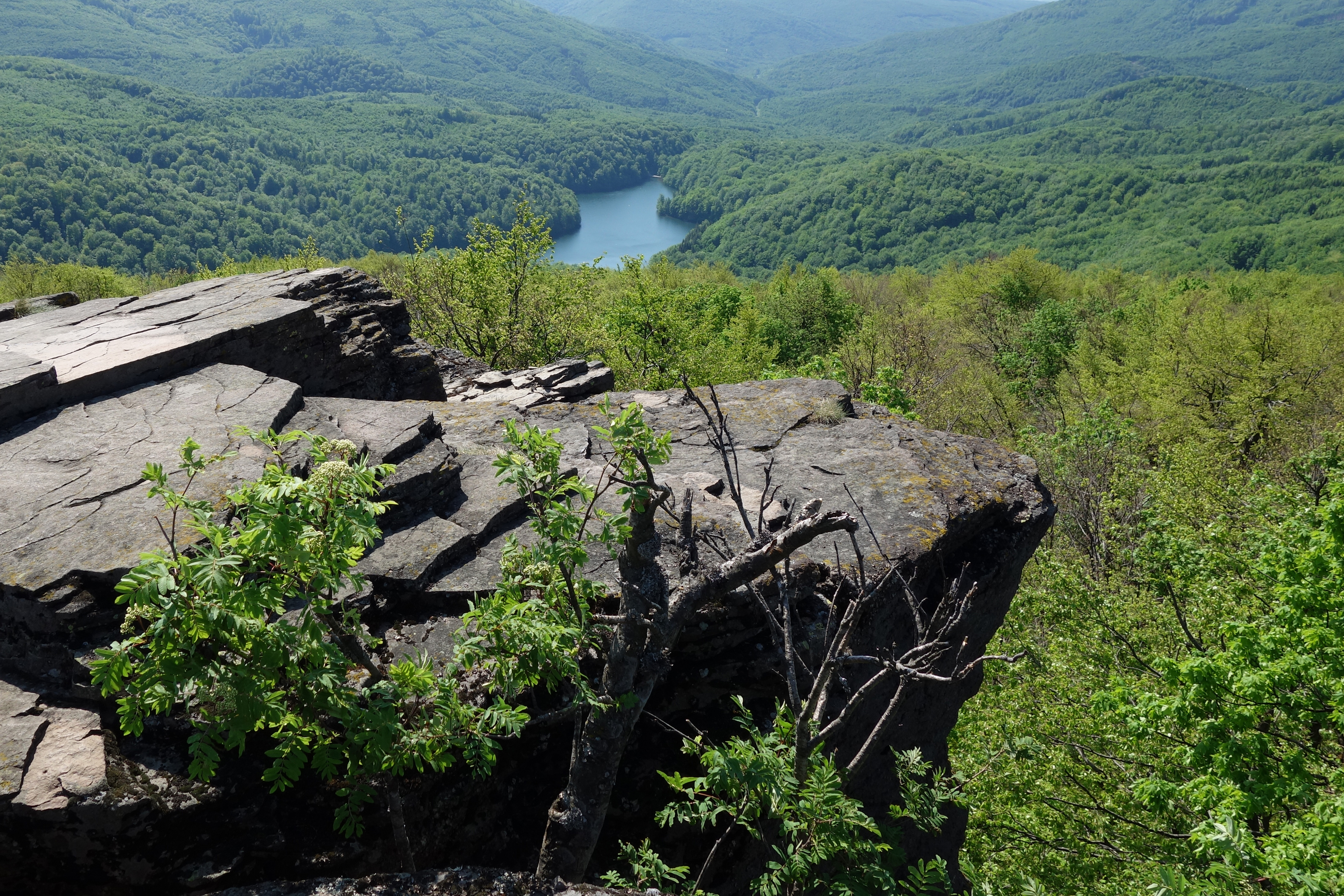
View of Morské oko from Sninský kameň

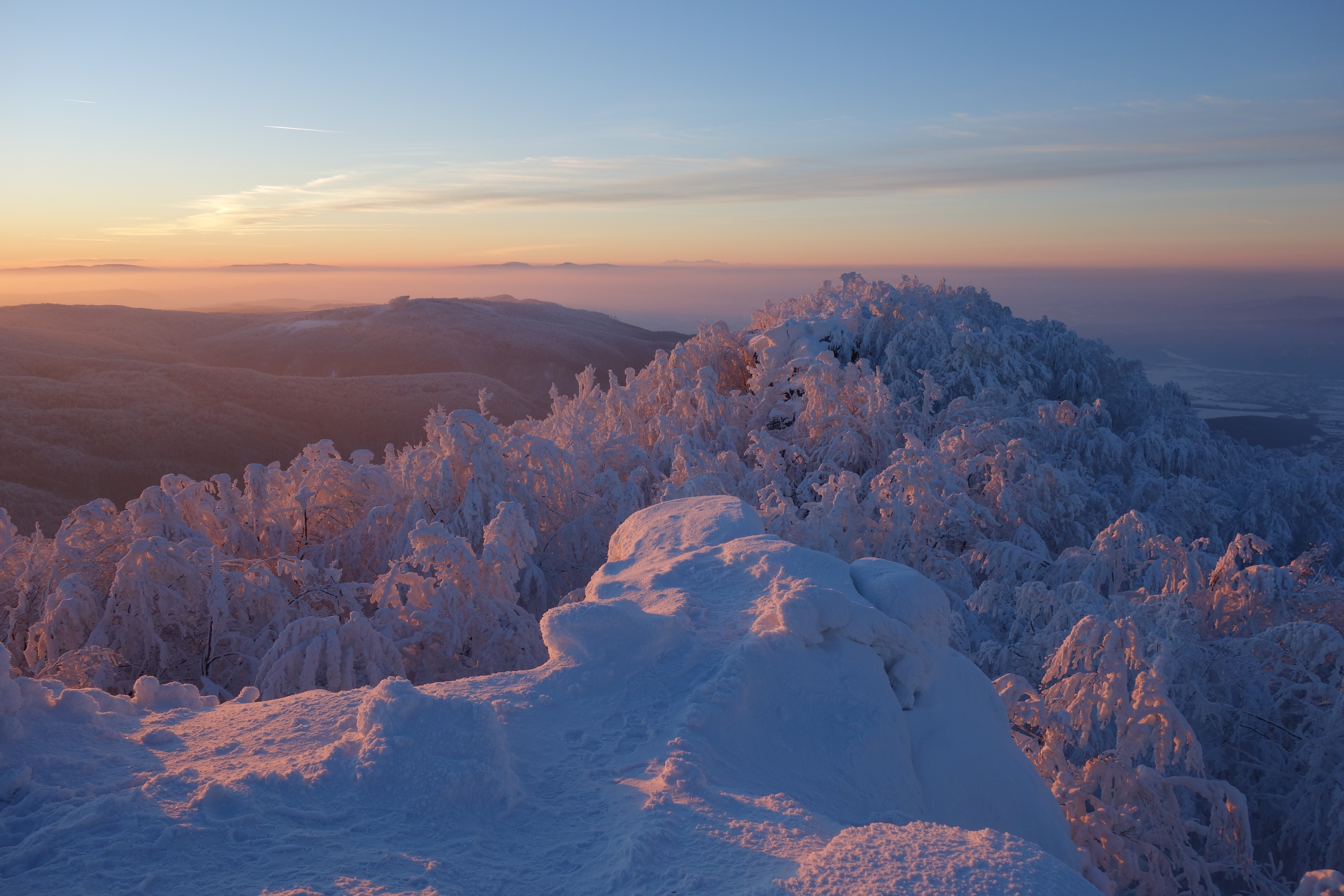
Sninský kameň in winter at sunset

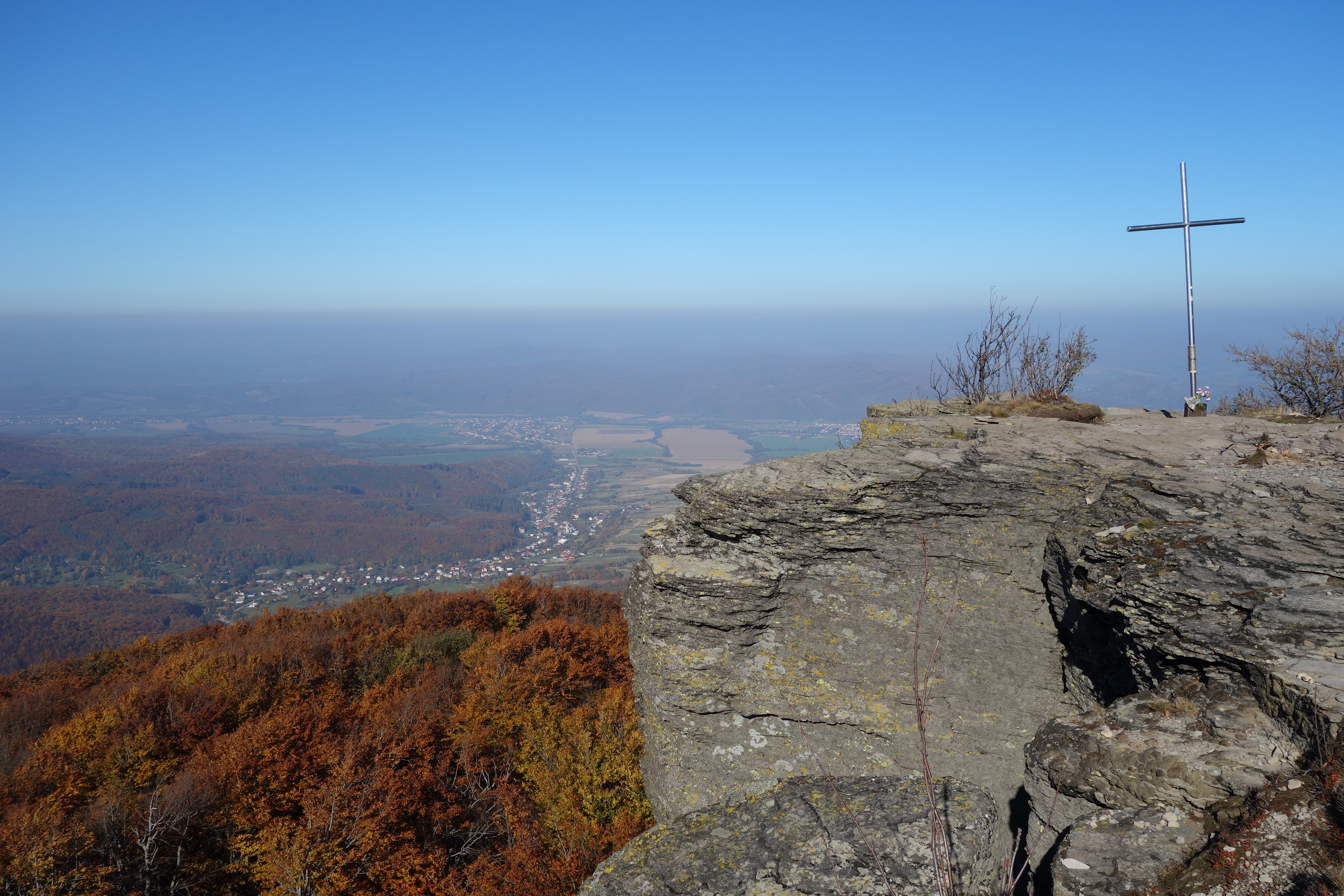
Sninský kameň in autumn

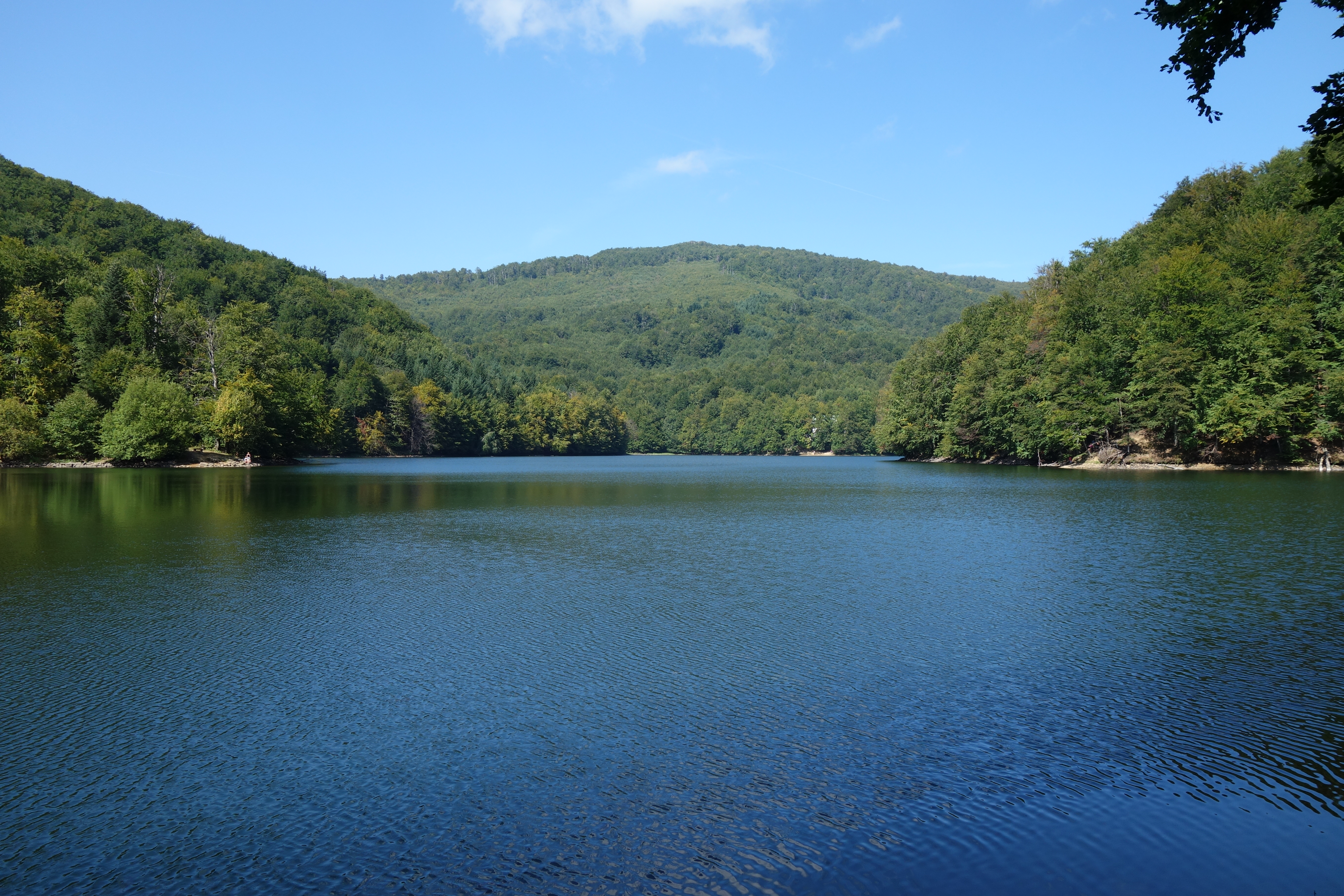
Morské oko and peak Sninský kameň

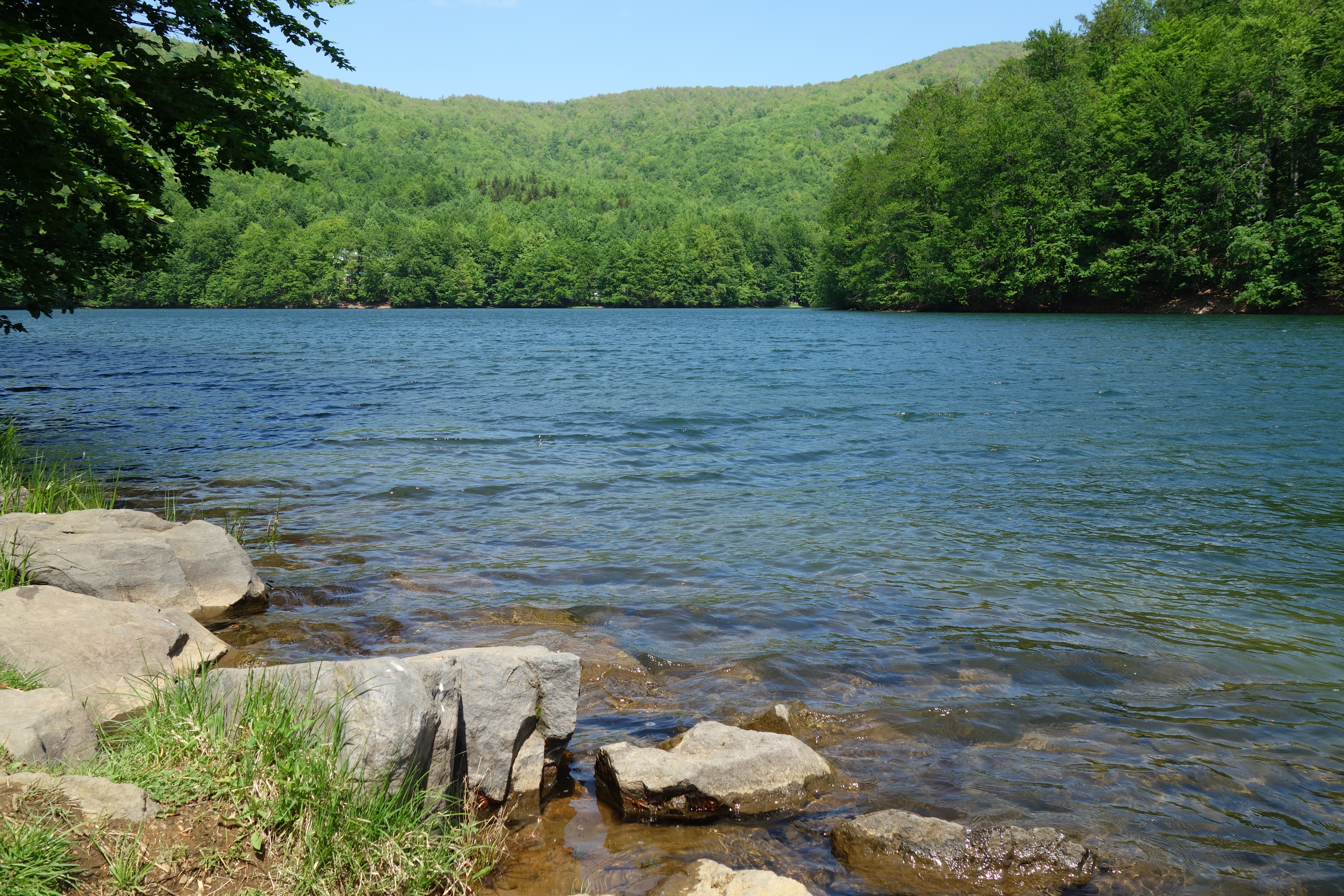
Morské oko in May

== See also ==
- Vihorlat Mountains
- Morské oko
