= List of lakes by country =

This list of lakes by country.

== Africa ==
=== Great Lakes of Africa ===
- Lake Albert (Mobuto-Sese-Seko)
- Lake Chad
- Lake Edward
- Lake Fianga
- Lake Kariba
- Lake Kivu
- Lake Tana
- Lake Mweru
- Lake Nasser (Lake Nubia in Sudan)
- Lake Nyasa (Lake Malawi)
- Lake Tanganyika
- Lake Turkana (Lake Rudolf or Rudolph)
- Lake Victoria shared between Kenya, Uganda and Tanzania.

=== Lists by country ===
==== Algeria ====
- Chott Ech Chergui
- Chott el Hodna
- Lake of Fetzara
- Lake Akfadou
- Réghaïa lake
- Sebkha el Melah

==== Angola ====
- Bezi-Bezi
- Calundo (Cameia)
- Cambala
- Carumbo
- Catete
- Chandumba
- Chavuma Complex
- Chiboco
- Chibondo
- Chicapa
- Chiuoso
- Cuango
- Dilolo Lake
- Embundo Complex
- Macanda
- Machive
- Magiuas
- Malanje
- Mangue
- Maninga Complex
- Muchova
- Muongo
- Nangage
- Nuntechite
- Sapua
- Uambafuca

==== Benin ====
- Lake Ahémé
- Lake Aziri
- Lake Nokoué
- Lake Porto Novo
- Lake Sele
- Lake Toho
- Togbadji Lagoon

==== Botswana ====
- Makadikadi Basin
- Lake Ngami

==== Cameroon ====
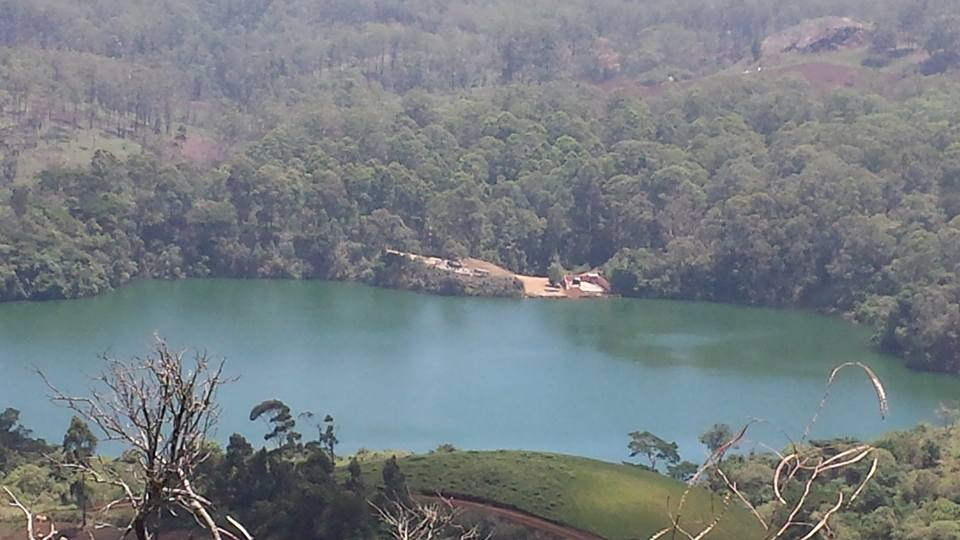
- A view of Lake Awing located in the North West Region of Cameroon
  Lake Awing
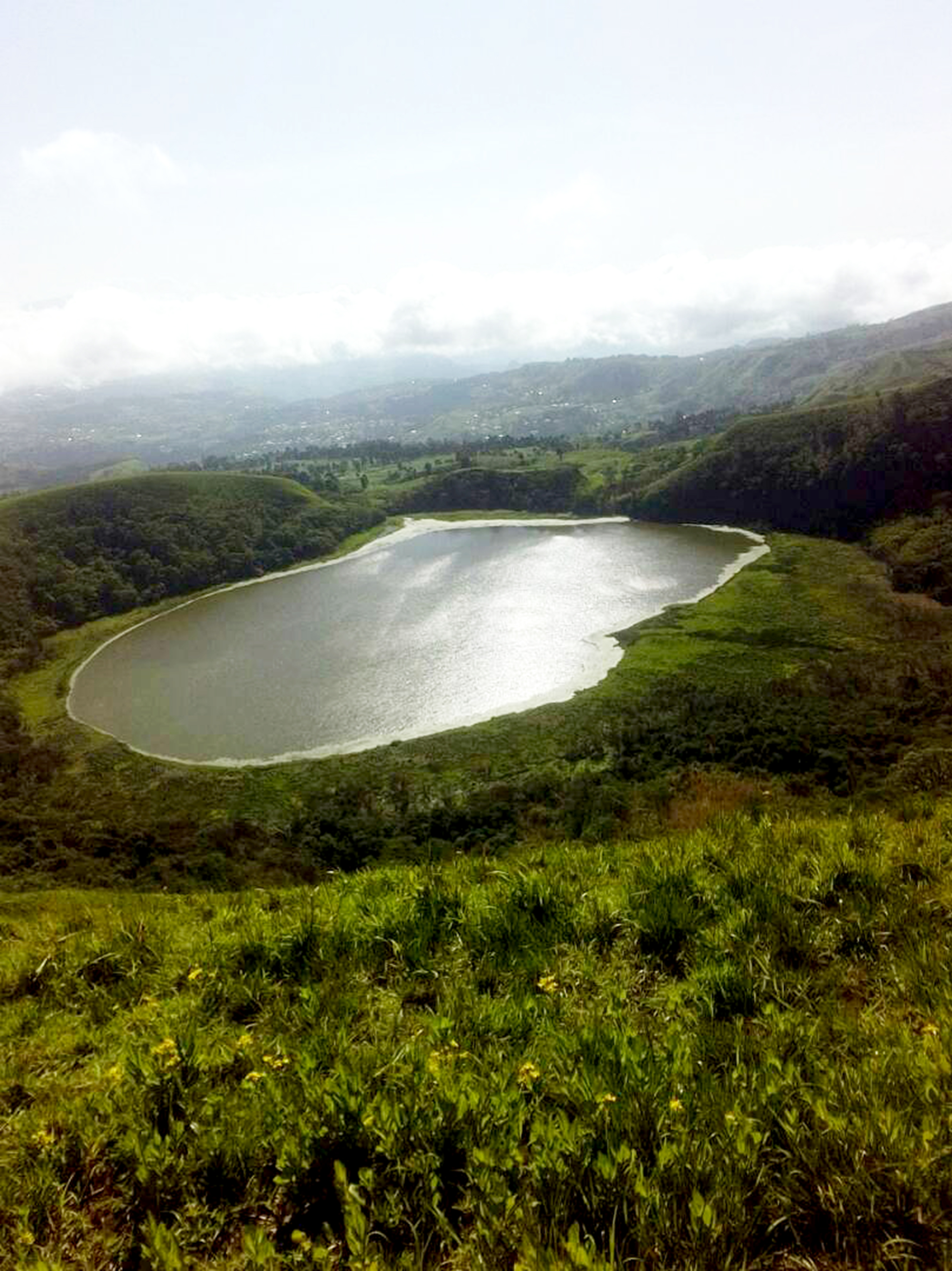
- Lake Bambili, Cameroon
  Lake Bambili
- Lake Bamendjing
- Lake Bankim
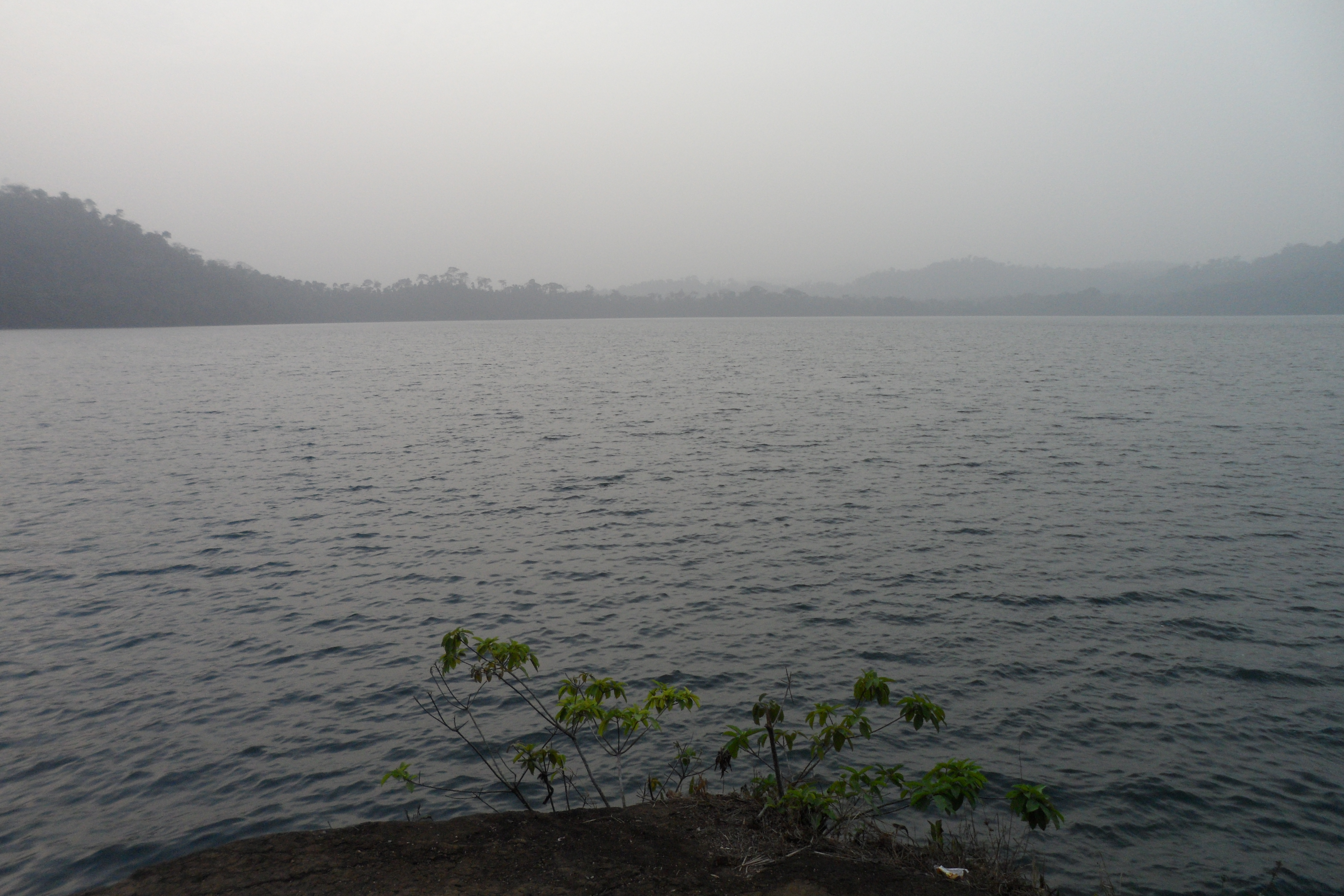
- Full extent of Lake Barombi, Cameroon
  Lake Barombi
- Lake Edip
- Lake Kendall
- Lake Lagdo
- Lake Mbakaou
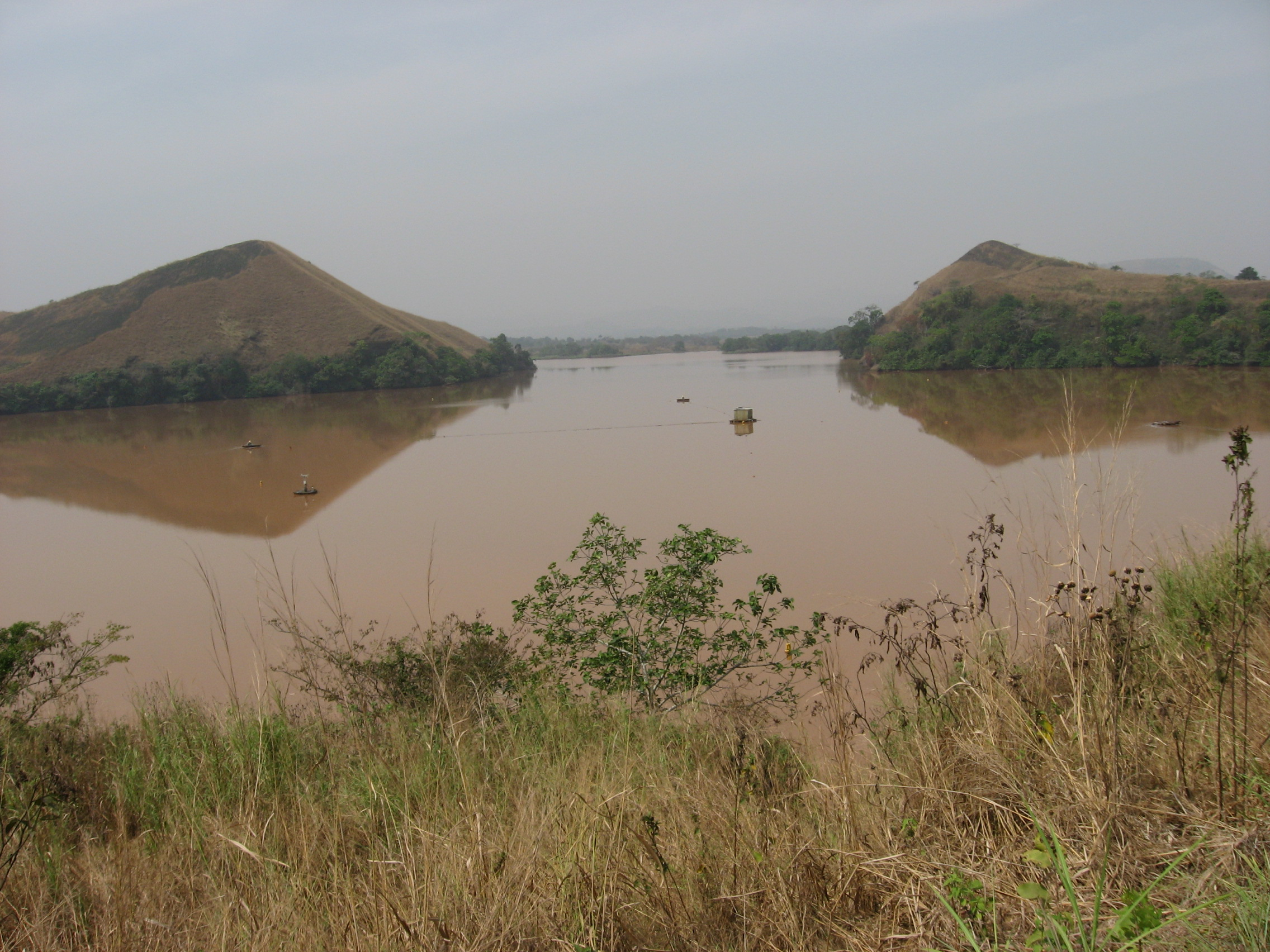
- Lake Monoun, Cameroon
  Lake Monoun
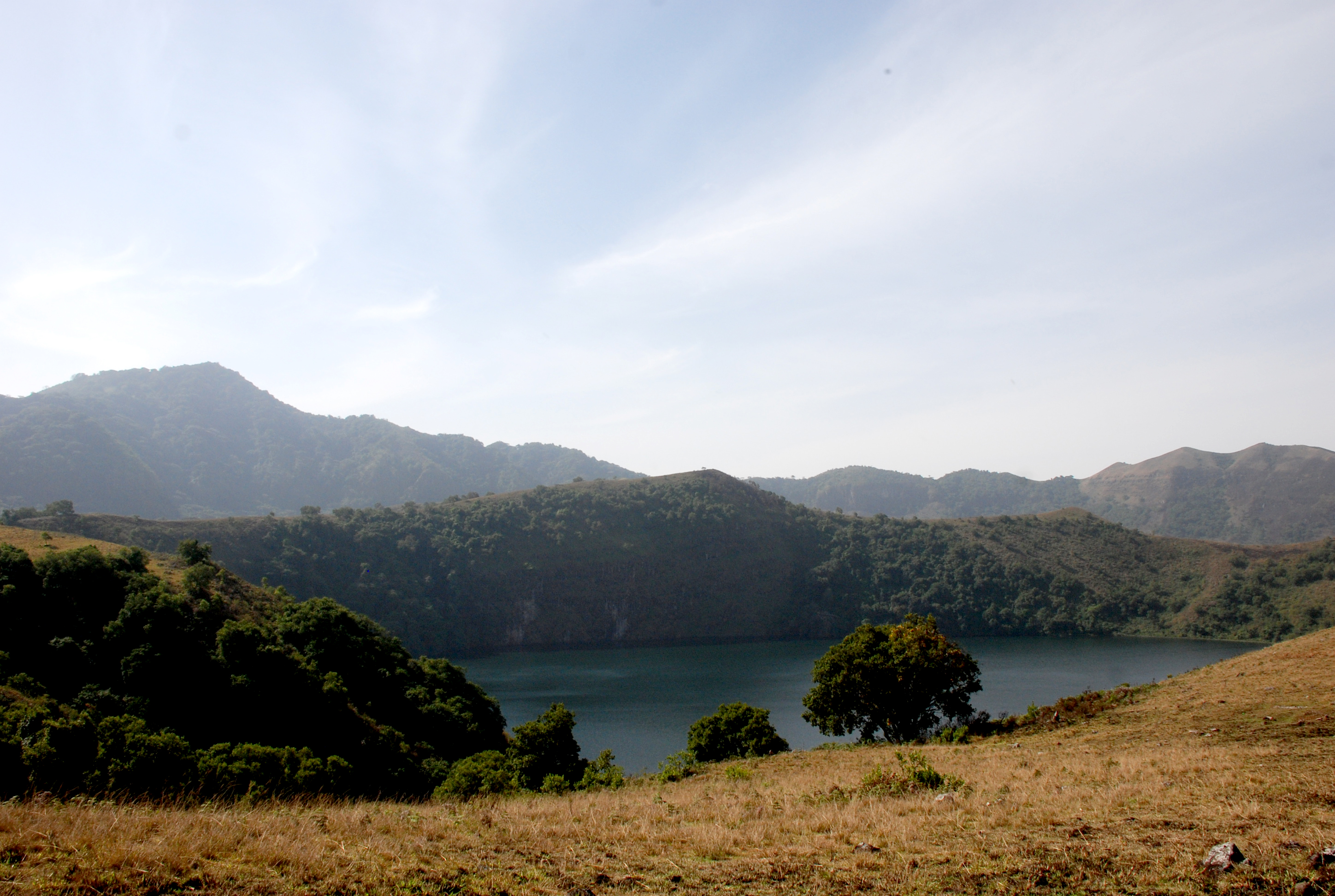
- Lake Manengouba, Cameroon
  Muanenguba Lakes (Twin Lakes)
- Lake Nyos
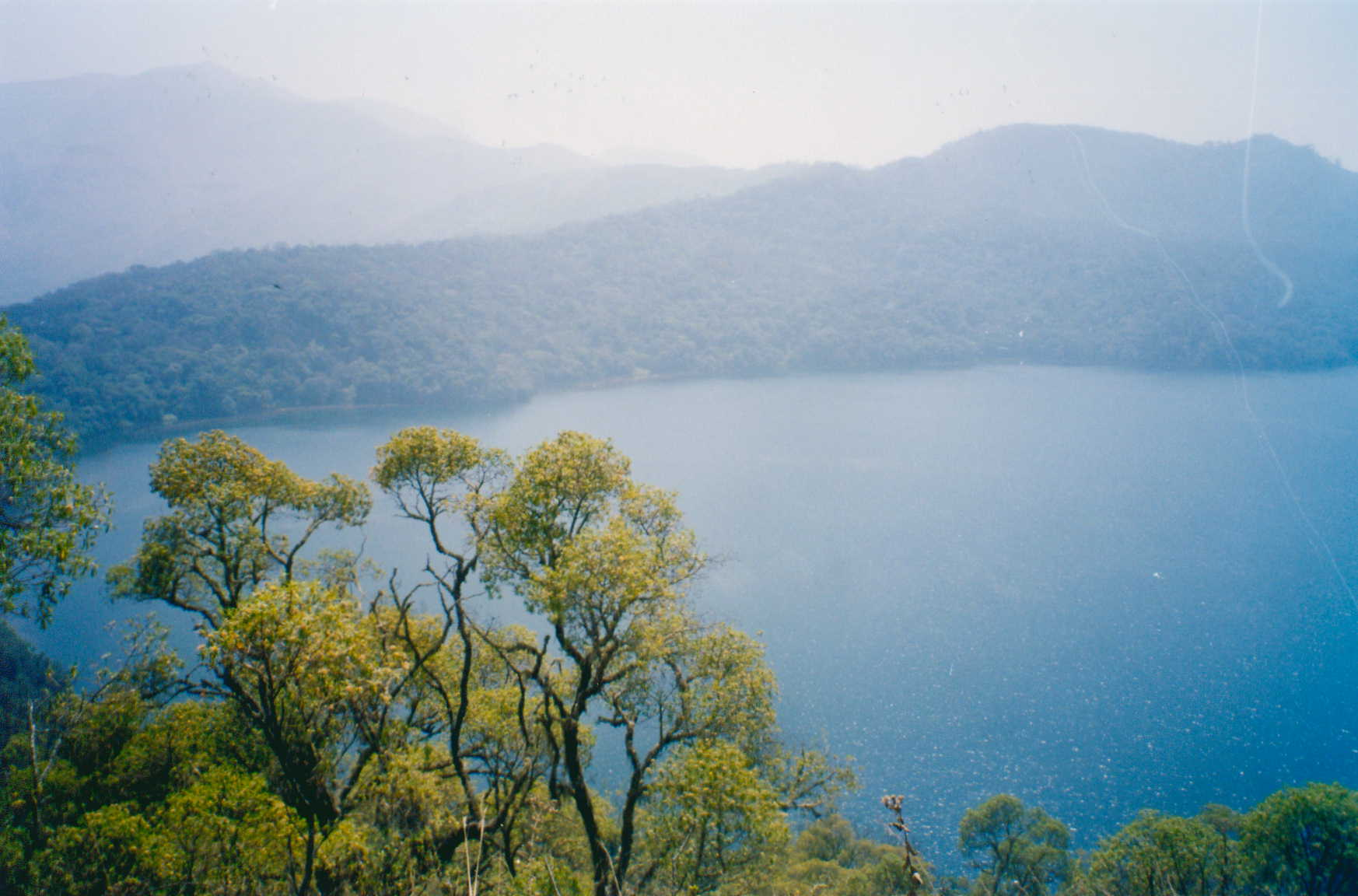
- Lake Oku, Cameroon
  Lake Oku
- Lake Wum

==== Chad ====
- Lake Chad

==== Djibouti ====
- Lake Assal

==== Ghana ====
- Lake Volta
- Lake Bosomtwe

==== Madagascar ====
- Lake Alaotra
- Lake Bedo
- Lake Itasy
- Lake Ihotry
- Lake Kinkony
- Lake Tritriva
- Lake Tsimanampetsotsa
- Lakes Manambolomaty

==== Malawi ====
- Lake Chilwa
- Lake Malawi

==== Mauritania ====
- Lac de Mâl

==== Mozambique ====
- Cabora Bassa Lake

==== Nigeria ====
- Kainji Lake
- Oguta Lake
- Asejire Lake

==== Sudan ====
- Roseires Reservoir
- Lake No
- Lake Nubia (southern reaches of Lake Nasser)

==== Togo ====
- Lake Togo

== Antarctica ==
There are hundreds of lakes deep below the ice of Antarctica.

- Basalt Lake
- Lake Brownworth
- Don Juan Pond
- Parochlus Lake
- Penny Lake
- Lake Pewe
- Lake Vanda
- Lake Vida
- Lake Vostok
- Lake Whillans

== Asia ==
=== International lakes of Asia ===
- Pangong Tso
- Lake Baikal – Lake Baikal is located in Siberia in southeastern Russia, just north of Mongolia. Considered the oldest surviving freshwater lake on the planet, it is also the deepest body of water in Asia at 5,315 feet (1,620 m), and the largest freshwater lake by volume, containing 20% of the planet's fresh water. An elongated lake, it has a maximum width of 60 miles (97 km) with an approximate length of 389 miles (626 km), and is fed by more than 300 rivers and streams.
- Caspian Sea – Situated between Asia and Europe and fed by the Volga and Ural Rivers in the north, the Caspian Sea is nevertheless somewhat salty in its central and south portions. The surface area measures 371,000 square kilometres (143,000 sq mi), with a maximum depth of 1,025 metres (3,363 ft).
- Aral Sea – Also in far-western Asia, just east of the Caspian Sea, the Aral Sea straddles the boundary between Kazakhstan and Uzbekistan. The Aral Sea is shrinking due to evaporation and diversion for irrigation (among other factors) and what remains (only 10% of its former size) is now almost totally polluted by fertilizer runoff, Soviet weapon testing residue and industrial projects, leading to it being called "one of the planet's worst environmental disasters".
  - North Aral Sea
  - South Aral Sea
- Dead Sea – Located on the border of Israel and Jordan.
- Lake Khanka

=== Lists by country ===
==== Afghanistan ====
- Gowd-e-Zereh

==== Bangladesh ====
- Kaptai Lake

==== Brunei ====
- Cypt

==== Cambodia ====
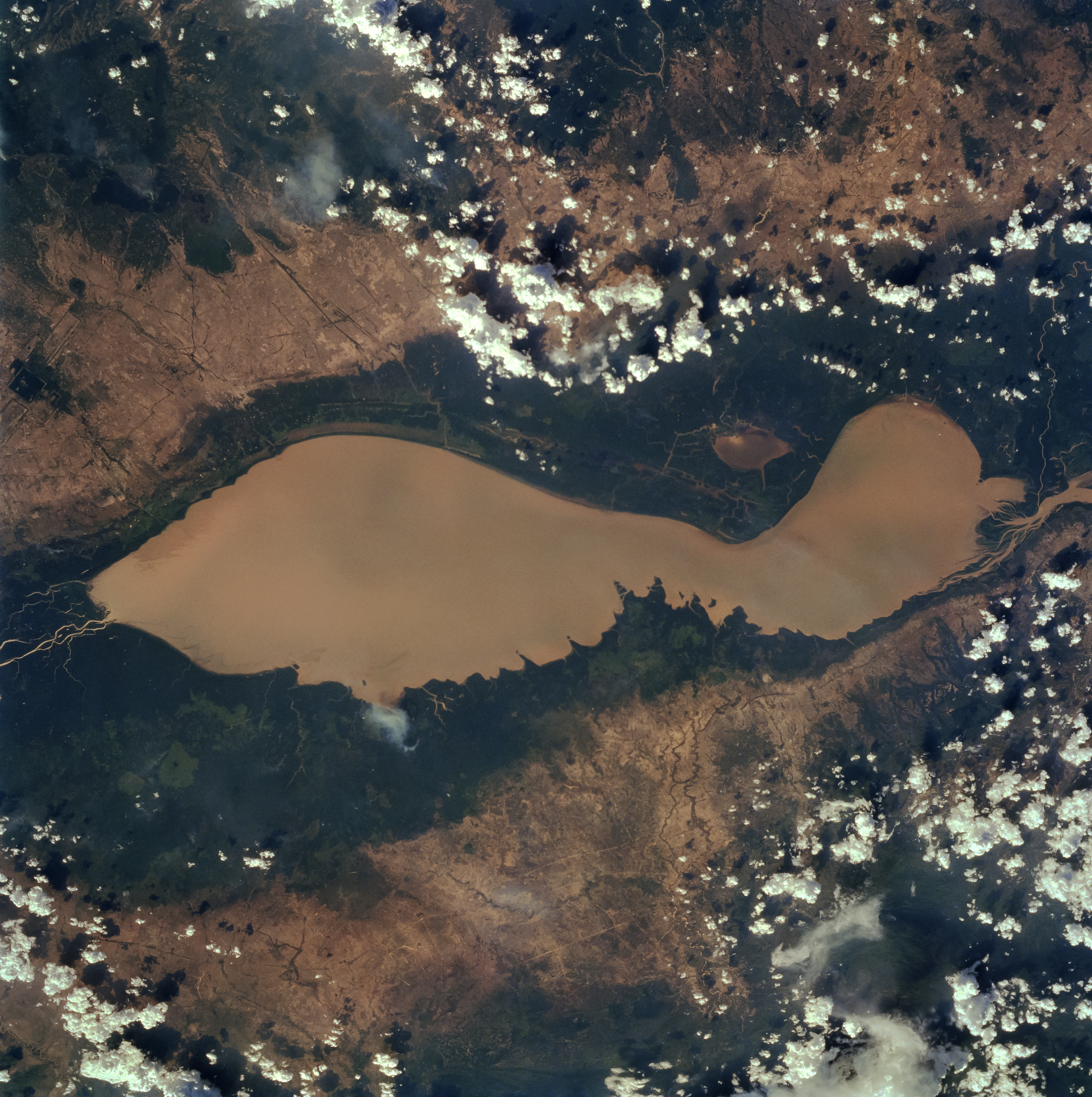
Tonlé Sap Lake, Cambodia

- Tonlé Sap

==== China ====
- Dongting Lake
- Poyang Lake
- Qinghai Lake
- Lake Tai

==== India ====
- Avalanche Lake
- Dal Lake
- Emerald Lake
- Chandra Taal
- Nainital Lake
- Sheshnag Lake
- Suraj Tal
- Tso Moriri
- Tsongmo Lake
- Chaluk lake
- Chilka Lake
- Shanti Sagara

==== Indonesia ====
- Lake Toba

==== Iran ====
- Caspian Sea
- Lake Urmia
- Gavkhouni
- Hamun Lake
- Namak Lake
- Bakhtegan Lake
- Maharloo Lake
- Zarivar Lake

==== Iraq ====
- Lake Habbaniyah (Hawr al Habbaniyah)
- Lake Milh (Bahr al Milh)
- Lake Tharthar (Buhayrat ath Tharthar)
- Sawa lake

==== Israel ====
- Dead Sea
- Sea of Galilee

==== Japan ====
- Lake Mashū

==== Jordan ====
- Dead Sea

==== Kazakhstan ====
- Lake Alakol
- Lake Balkhash
- Chagan Lake
- Kaindy Lake
- Lake Sasykkol
- Lake Tengiz
- Lake Zaysan

==== Kyrgyzstan ====
- Ala Köl
- Besh-Tash Lake
- Chatyr-Kul
- Issyk-Kul
- Jashyl Köl
- Juukuchak Lake
- Kapka Tash Lake
- Kara-Suu Lake
- Köl-Suu
- Költör Lake
- Kölükök
- Kulun Lake
- Kylaköl
- Ökürgön-Köl
- Lake Sary-Chelek
- Merzbacher Lake
- Saryköl
- Song Köl Lake

==== Nepal ====
- Fewa Lake
- Rara Lake
- Rupa Lake
- Begnas Lake
- Shey phoksundo lake
- Tilicho Lake
- Gosaikunda Lake

==== Pakistan ====
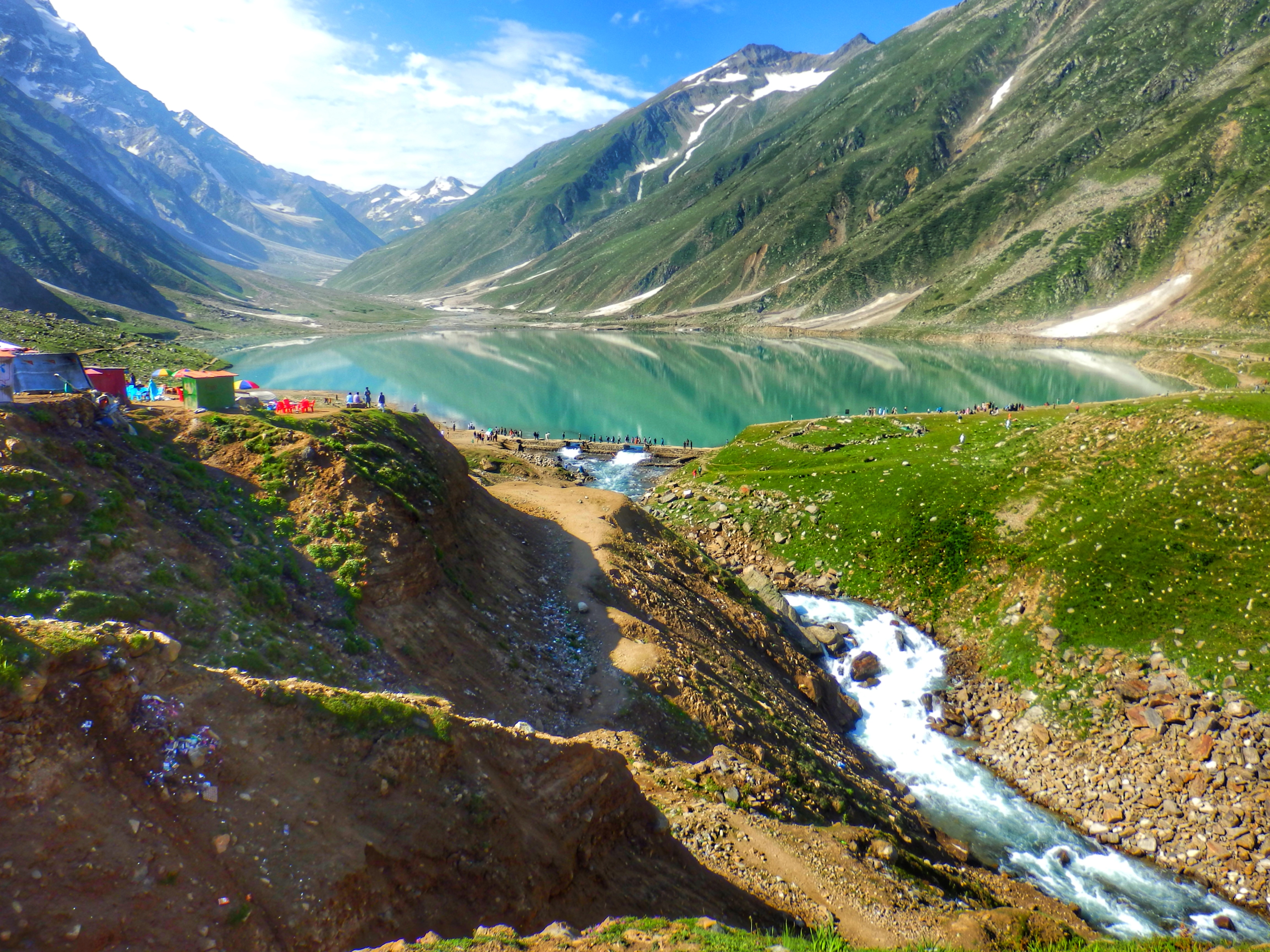
Lake Saiful Muluk, Kaghan Valley, Pakistan

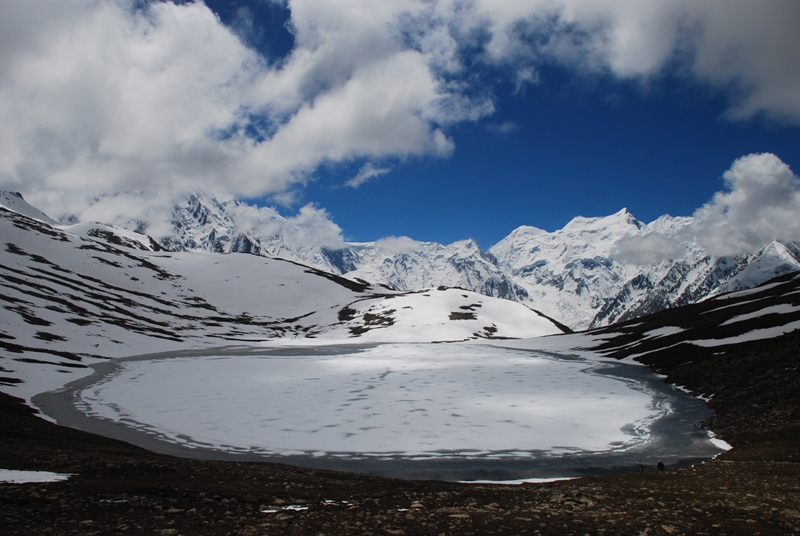
Rush Lake (Pakistan), the highest lake in Pakistan and 27th-highest in the world

- Attabad Lake
- Ansoo Lake
- Banjosa Lake
- Dudipatsar Lake
- Hanna Lake
- Karambar Lake
- Kundol Lake
- Lulusar Lake
- Mahodand Lake
- Payee Lake
- Pyala Lake
- Shangrila Lake

==== Philippines ====
- Laguna de Bay
- Lake Lanao

==== Russia ====
- Lake Baikal

==== Saudi Arabia ====
- Al-Asfar Lake
- Modon Lake
- Lake Dumat al-Jandal

==== Syria ====
- Euphrates Lake
- Lake Qattinah
- Lake Al-Rastan
- Lake Muzairib
- Zarzar Lake
- Lake Ballouran

==== Turkey ====
- Lake Van

==== State of Palestine|Palestine ====
- Dead Sea
- Sea of Galilee

==== Taiwan ====
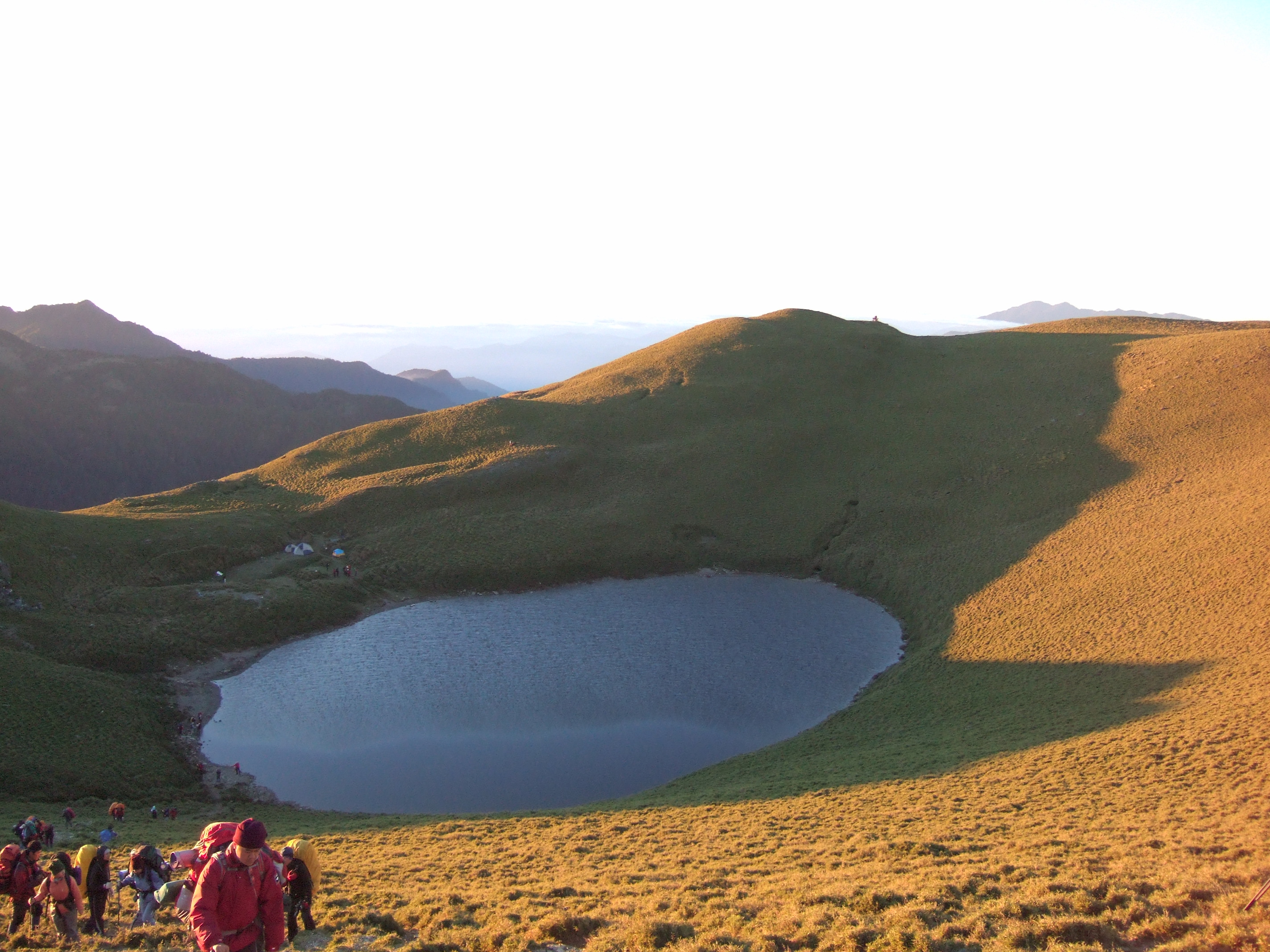
Chiaming Lake in Taitung County, Taiwan

- Bitan Lake
- Changpi Lake
- Chengcing Lake
- Chiaming Lake
- Cueifong Lake
- Gugang Lake
- Jinshi Lake
- Lantan Lake
- Liyu Lake
- Longtan Lake
- Meihua Lake
- Milk Lake
- Sun Moon Lake
- Zhongzheng Lake

== Europe ==
=== International lakes of Europe ===
- Lake Constance (Austria, Germany, Switzerland; Bodensee)
- Dojran Lake (North Macedonia and Greece)
- Lake Geneva (France, Switzerland; Lac Léman)
- Lake Lugano (Switzerland, Italy)
- Lake Maggiore (Switzerland, Italy; Lago Maggiore)
- Lake Neusiedl (Neusiedler See)/Fertő (Austria, Hungary)
- Lake Ohrid (North Macedonia, Albania; Liqeni i Ohrit)
- Lake Peipsi-Pihkva (Estonia, Russia)
- Lake Great Prespa (Albania, North Macedonia, Greece)
- Lake Small Prespa (Albania, Greece)
- Lake Skadar (Montenegro, Albania; Liqeni i Shkodrës)
- Lake Vištytis (Lithuania, Russia)
- Lago di Lei (an artificial lake created by a dam; the waters are mostly in Italy but the dam is in Switzerland).

=== Lists by country ===
==== Albania ====
- Lake Ohrid

==== Armenia ====
- Lake Sevan
- Lake Lessing

==== Austria ====
- Ahornsee

==== Azerbaijan ====
- Lake Sarysu
- Lake Ağgöl

==== Bulgaria ====
- Lake Atanasovsko
- Banderishki Lakes
- Batak Reservoir
- Lake Burgas
- Dospat Reservoir
- Lake Durankulak
- Iskar Reservoir
- Lake Mandrensko
- Lake Pomorie
- Lake Varna
- Seven Rila Lakes
- Lake Srebarna

==== Cyprus ====
- Larnaca Salt Lake
- Limassol Salt Lake

==== Hungary ====
- Lake Balaton
- Lake Tisza
- Lake Velencei
- Lake Hévíz
- Lake Vadkert

==== Italy ====
- Lake Garda

==== Latvia ====
- Lake Lubāns
- Lake Rāzna
- Lake Engure

==== Poland ====
- Lake Śniardwy
- Lake Mamry
- Lake Ruda Woda
- Lake Łebsko
- Lake Dąbie
- Lake Miedwie
- Lake Jeziorak
- Lake Niegocin
- Lake Hańcza

==== Serbia ====
- Lake Palić
- Perućac Lake
- Vlasina Lake

==== Slovakia ====
- Blatné
- Devínske
- Jazero
- Morské oko
- Štrbské pleso
- Zemplínska šírava
- Zlaté Piesky

==== Slovenia ====
- Lake Cerknica

==== Spain ====
- Lake of Banyoles
- El Atazar Dam
- Estanys de Baiau
- Lakes of Covadonga
- Embalse de Navacerrada
- Sanabria Lake Natural Park

==== Sweden ====
- Vänern
- Vättern
- Mälaren
- Hjälmaren
- Storsjön

== North and Central America ==
=== International lakes of North America ===
Listed in order of occurrence from easternmost border terminus to the westernmost

- Woodland Flowage
- Grand Falls Flowage
- Spednic Lake (part of the Chiputneticook Lakes)
- East Grand Lake (part of the Chiputneticook Lakes)
- North Lake, partly in North Lake Parish, New Brunswick
- Glazier Lake
- Beau Lake
- Lac de l'Est
- Little St. John Lake (Petit lac Saint-Jean)
- Lac Wallace
- Line Pond (Etang Duck)
- Lake Memphremagog a 40-mile-long (64 km) glacial lake that extends from Vermont into Canada
- Lake Champlain in Quebec in Canada and New York and Vermont in the United States (US)
- Lake Ontario in Ontario, Canada; and New York in the US
- Lake Erie in Ontario in Canada and Michigan, New York, Ohio, and Pennsylvania in the US
- Lake St Clair in Ontario, Canada; and Michigan in the US
- Lake Huron in Ontario in Canada and Michigan in the US
- Munuscong Lake
- Lake George
- Lake Superior in Ontario, Canada; and Michigan, Minnesota, and Wisconsin in the US
- South Fowl Lake
- North Fowl Lake
- Moose Lake, entry point into the Boundary Waters Canoe Area Wilderness
- Mountain Lake (Cook County, Minnesota)
- Rose Lake (Pigeon River)
- South Lake
- North Lake
- Gunflint Lake
- Magnetic Lake
- Clove Lake
- Granite Lake in Minnesota, US, and Ontario, Canada
- Granite Bay
- Gneiss Lake
- Maraboeuf Lake
- Saganaga Lake
- Swamp Lake
- Ottertrack Lake
- Knife Lake
- Carp Lake in Minnesota, US, and Ontario, Canada
- Birch Lake in Minnesota, US, and Ontario, Canada
- Sucker Lake
- Basswood Lake
- Wednesday Bay
- Thursday Bay
- Crooked Lake in Minnesota, US, and Ontario, Canada
- Sunday Bay
- Bottle Lake
- Lac la Croix
- Loon Lake
- Little Vermillion Lake
- Sand Point Lake
- Rainy Lake
- Lake of the Woods in Minnesota, US; Manitoba and Ontario in Canada
- Wilfred's Lake
- Susie Lake
- Osthus Lake
- South Messier Lake
- Hartley Lake
- Boundary Lake in North Dakota, US; Manitoba, Canada
- Cavalier Lake
- Ross Lake in North Dakota, US, and Manitoba, Canada
- Lake Metigoshe
- Bone Lake
- Line Lake
- Brush Lake in North Dakota, US, and Saskatchewan, Canada
- Salt Lake in northeastern Montana, US; known as Alkali Lake in Saskatchewan, Canada
- Upper Waterton Lake in Alberta, Canada; and Montana, US
- Cameron Lake in Alberta, Canada; and Montana, US
- Frozen Lake
- Lake Koocanusa
- Alden Lake
- Osoyoos Lake
- Ross Lake in Washington, US, and British Columbia, Canada

=== Lists by country ===
==== Canada ====
- Turtle Lake (Vancouver Island)
- Lake Huron
- Lake Superior
- Great Bear Lake
- Great Slave Lake
- Lake Erie
- Lake Winnipeg
- Lake Ontario
- Lake Athabasca
- Reindeer Lake
- Smallwood Reservoir
- Nettilling Lake
- Lake Winnipegosis
- Lake Nipigon
- Lake Manitoba
- Lake of the Woods
- Caniapiscau Reservoir
- Dubawnt Lake

==== El Salvador ====
- Lago de Coatepeque (Coatepeque Lake)
- Lago De Ilopango (Ilopango Lake)
- Laguna De Güija (Güija Lake)
- Laguna Verde
- Laguna de Alegria
- Olomega Lake
- Suchitlán Lake

==== Guatemala ====
- Lake Atitlan

==== Honduras ====
- Lake Yojoa

==== Mexico ====
- Lake Chapala
- Lake Texcoco
- Lake Catemaco
- Lake Patzcuaro
- Lake Cuitzeo
- Lake Zirahuen

==== Nicaragua ====
- Lake Apanás
- Lake Nicaragua (Lake Cocibolca)
- Lake Managua
- Laguna de Apoyo

==== Panama ====
- Lago Bayano
- Gatun Lake

==== United States ====
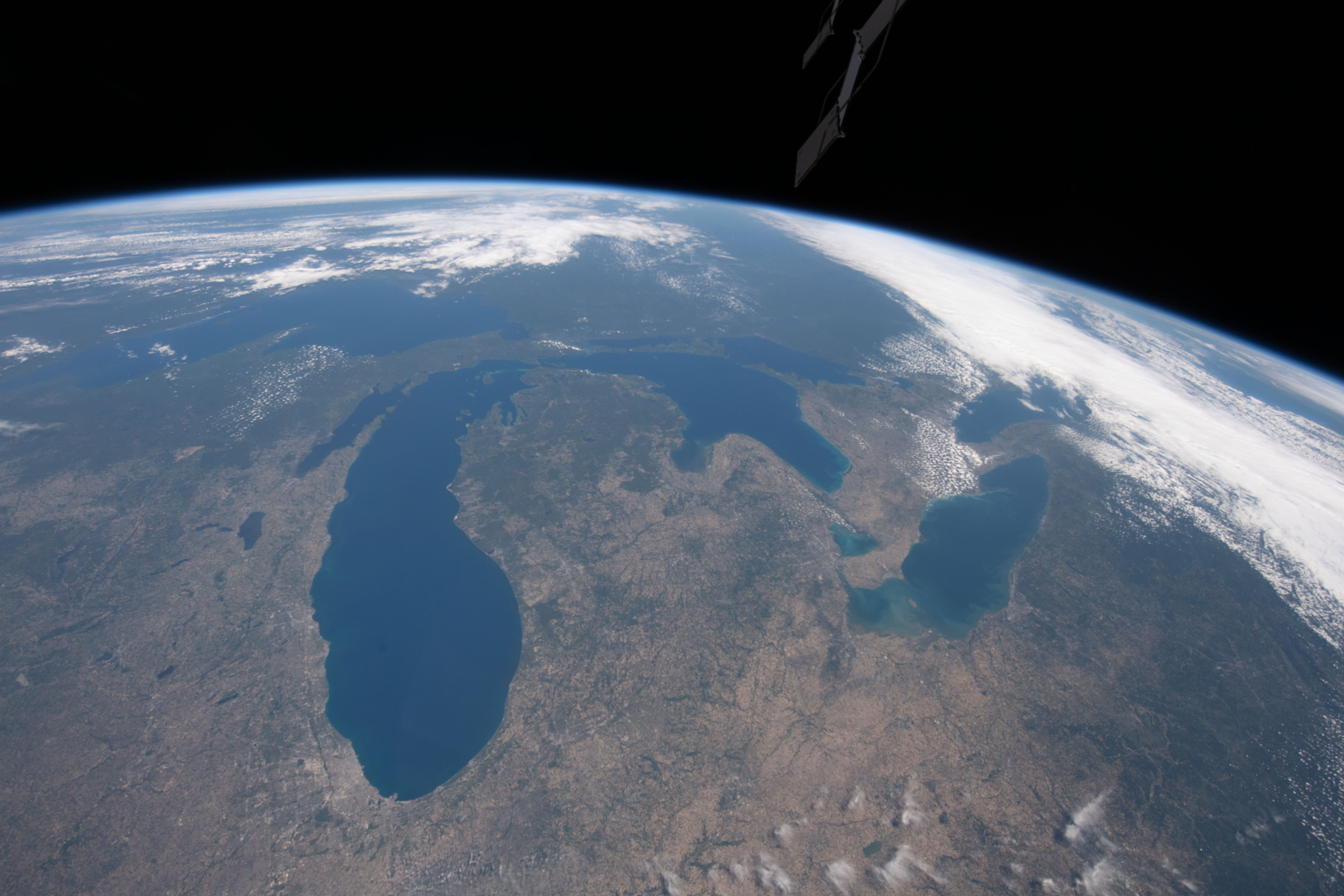
The Great Lakes on June 23, 2022, from the International Space Station

- Crater Lake
- Great Salt Lake
- The Great Lakes: Lake Superior, Lake Huron, Lake Michigan, Lake Erie, Lake Ontario
- Lake Champlain
- Lake Okeechobee
- Lake Pontchartrain
- Lake Tahoe
- Lake Winnebago

== Oceania ==
=== Lists by country ===
==== Nauru ====
- Buada Lagoon

== South America ==
=== International lakes of South America ===
- Lake Titicaca (in Peru and Bolivia)
- General Carrera Lake (in Chile and Argentina)
- O'Higgins/San Martín Lake (in Chile and Argentina)
- Cochrane/Pueyrredón Lake (in Chile and Argentina)
- Cami/Fagnano Lake (in Chile and Argentina)
- Palena/General Vintter Lake (in Chile and Argentina)
- Lake Viedma (undefined border near the Southern Patagonian Ice Field between Chile and Argentina)

=== Lists by country ===
==== Guyana ====
- Capoey Lake
- Mainstay Lake
- Tapakuma Lake
- Hot and Cold Lake
- Lukunanikabra Lake
- Lamparina Lake
- Lukunanikabra Lake
- Kara Kara Blue Lake

==== Peru ====
- Lake Titicaca
- Quñuqqucha

==== Suriname ====
- Brokopondo Reservoir

==== Venezuela ====
- Guri (man-made)
- Lake Maracaibo (sometimes considered a sea)
- Lake Valencia

== See also ==
- List of lakes by area
- List of lakes by depth
- List of lakes by volume
- List of dams and reservoirs
- List of international lakes
