= Mountain Lake =

Mountain Lake may refer to a location in North America:

== Canada ==
- Mountain Lake (Nova Scotia), in Halifax Regional Municipality
- Mountain Lake (Ontario), several lakes
- Mountain Lake (mine), a prospective uranium mine in the Northwest Territories

== United States ==
- Mountain Lake, Florida, a private community
- Mountain Lake (Georgia), a lake near Georgia State Route 34
- Mountain Lake (Minnesota–Ontario), a lake on the Canada–US border.
- Mountain Lake, Minnesota, a city in Cottonwood County
- Mountain Lake Township, Cottonwood County, Minnesota
- Mountain Lake, New Jersey, a community
- Mountain Lake (New York), a lake in southern Adirondack Park in upstate New York
- Mountain Lake (Delaware County, New York), a lake
- Mountain Lake (San Francisco), a lake
- Mountain Lake (Virginia), a lake where the exteriors for the 1987 movie Dirty Dancing were filmed

== See also ==
- Lake Mountain (Victoria), Victoria, Australia
- Lake Mountains, Utah, United States
- Mountain Lake PBS, branding for WCFE-TV
- Mountain Lakes, New Hampshire
- Mountain Lakes, New Jersey
- Mountain Lakes station, a railway station in New Jersey
- Alpine lake
