= Alder Lake (disambiguation) =

Alder Lake is Intel's codename for the 12th-generation of Intel Core processors

Alder Lake may also refer to:

- Alder Lake (Washington), a reservoir on the Nisqually River in Eatonville, Washington in the U.S. state of Washington.
- Alder Lake (New York), a body of water located in Hardenburgh, Ulster County in the lower Hudson Valley region of New York.

== See also ==
- Alden Lake
- Aller Lake
- Allen Lake (disambiguation)
