= Takyarlu =

Takyarlu may refer to:

- Artavaz, Armenia
- Tsakhkashen, Aragatsotn, Armenia
