= Melong, Cameroon =

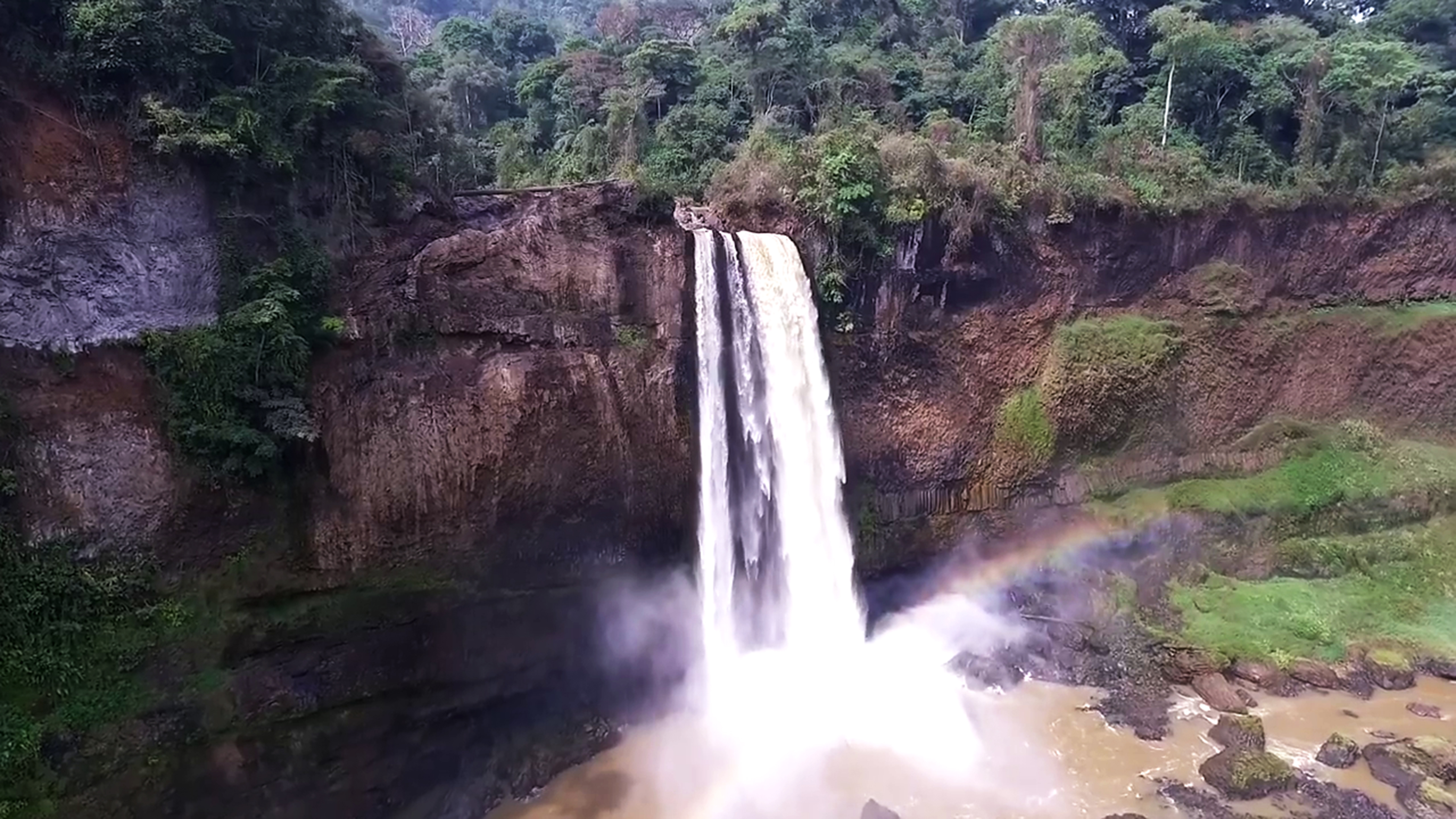
- Drone view of the amazing Ekom Nkam waterfall

- Location in Cameroon
- Coordinates: 5°7′16″N 9°57′10″E
- Country: Cameroon
- Region: Littoral
- Department: Moungo
- Elevation: 790 m (2,590 ft)

Population (2012)
  - Total: 71,189

Melong is a community in Cameroon. It lies on the N5 road to the north of Nkongsamba. The soil is volcanic and fertile. The country around Melong was once covered by thick rainforest, the native population are Mbo'o, a group of Sawa people who are established in the Littoral and Southwest Region of the Country. The community is made up of many villages like Melong Center, Mouanguel, Mbouroukou, Mboussoum, Mankwa, and Nsanke. Melong is a volcanic area and very favorable for agriculture. From here it is possible to visit the twin Manengouba lakes, and waterfalls from Ekom on the River Nkam.

== Gallery ==
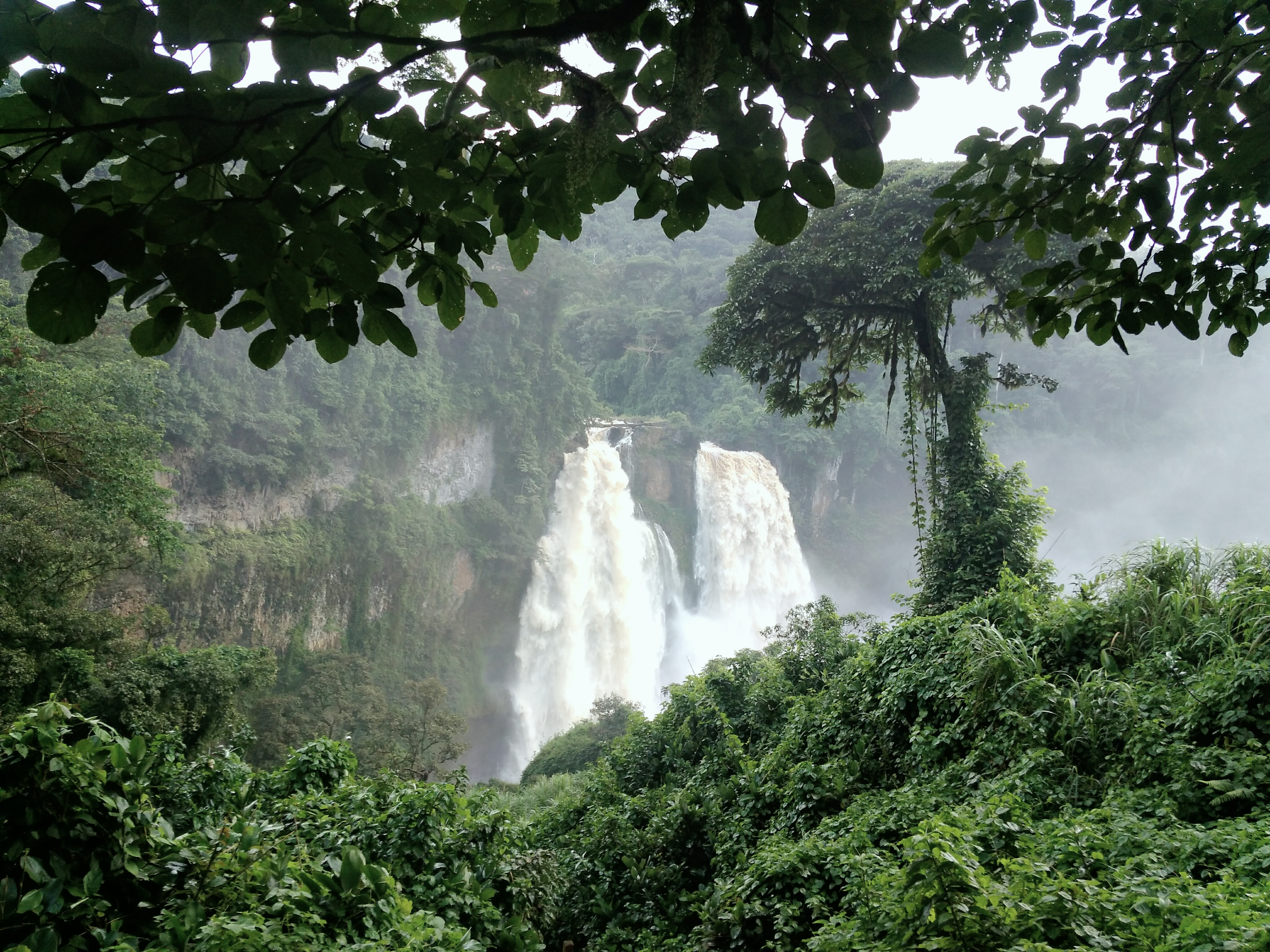
Ekom Nkam Melong Falls

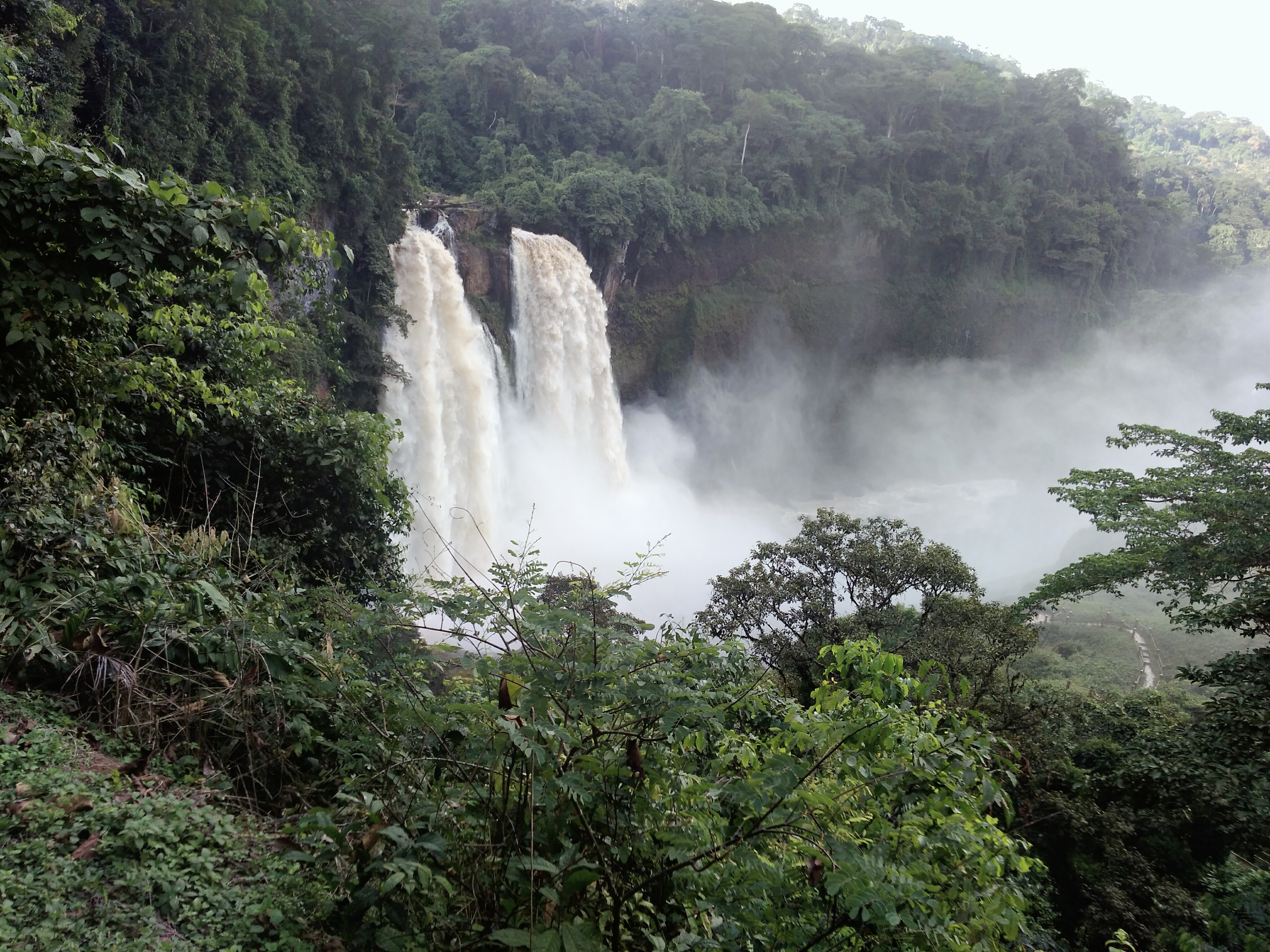
Ekom Nkam water Falls

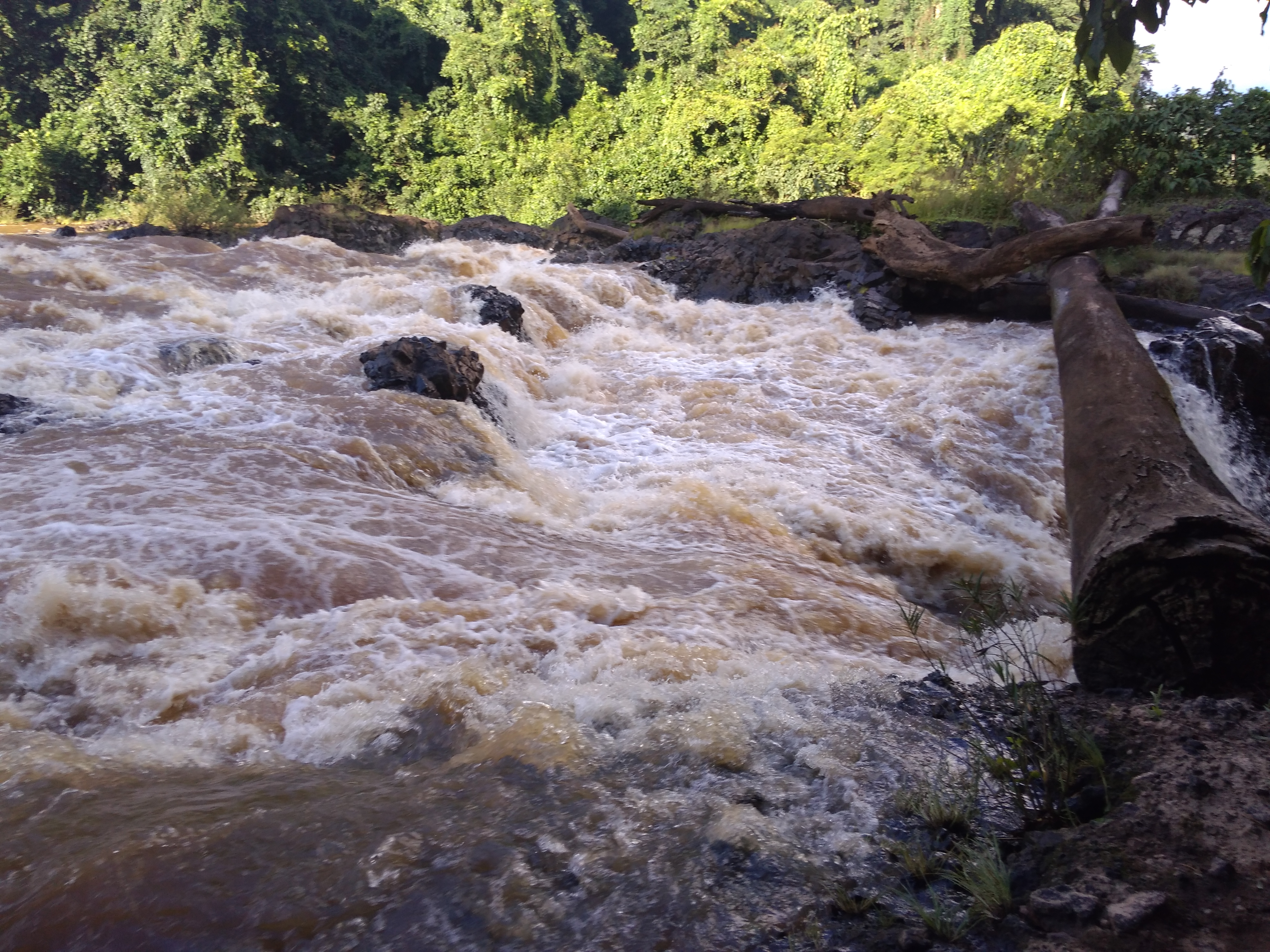
Ekom Nkam river

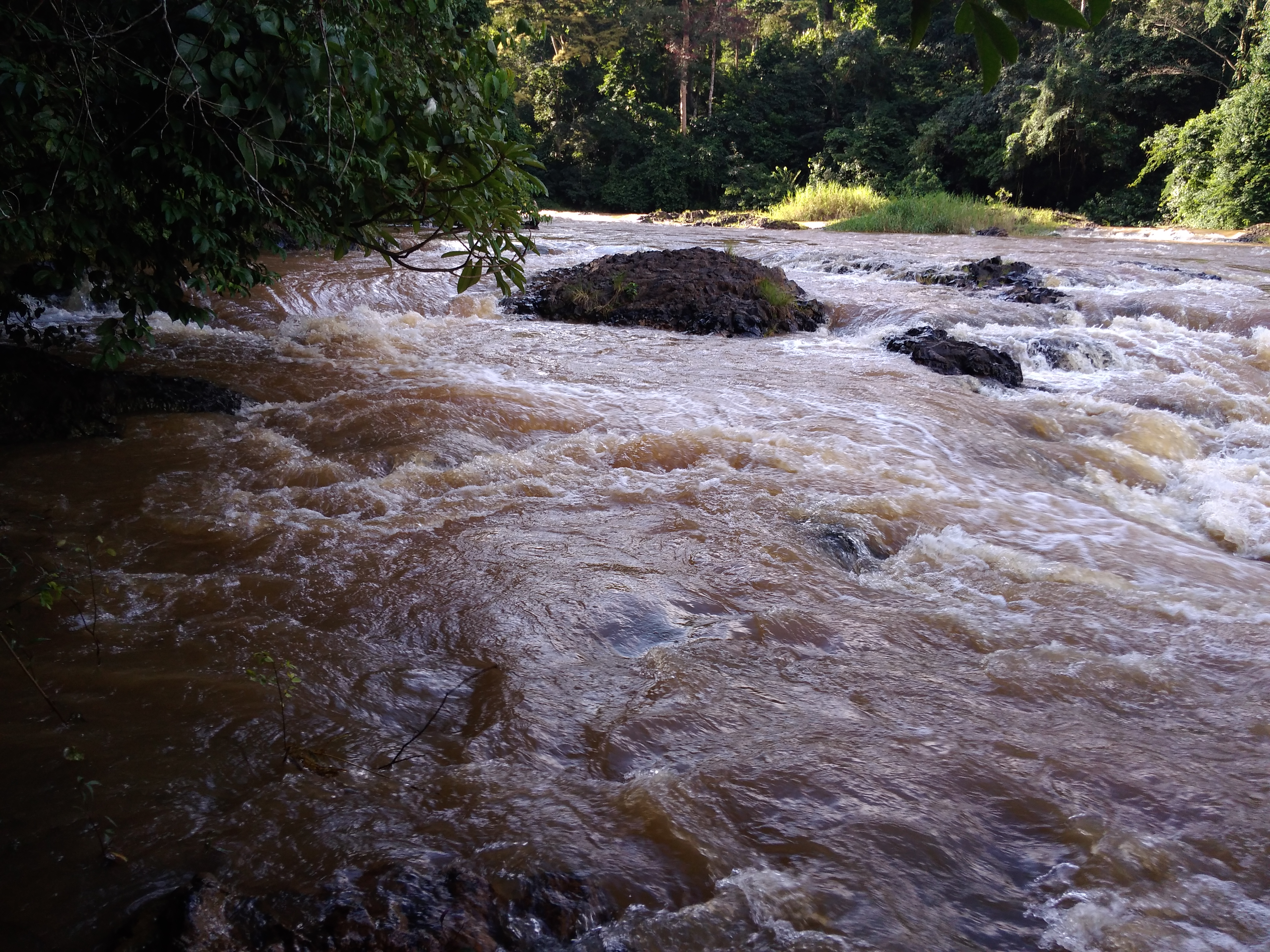
Ekom Nkam river

== See also ==
- Communes of Cameroon
