= Parochlus Lake =

- Location within Antarctica
- Location: South Georgia Island, Antarctica
- Coordinates: 54°10′S 36°45′W
- Type: lake

Parochlus Lake is a shallow lake at the head of Karrakatta Valley, to the west-northwest of Husvik Harbor, South Georgia. Named by the United Kingdom Antarctic Place-Names Committee (UK-APC) in 1990 after the midge Parochlus steinenii, whose larvae abound near the margins of the lake.
