= Coykendall Lodge =

Historic house in New York, United States

- U.S. National Register of Historic Places
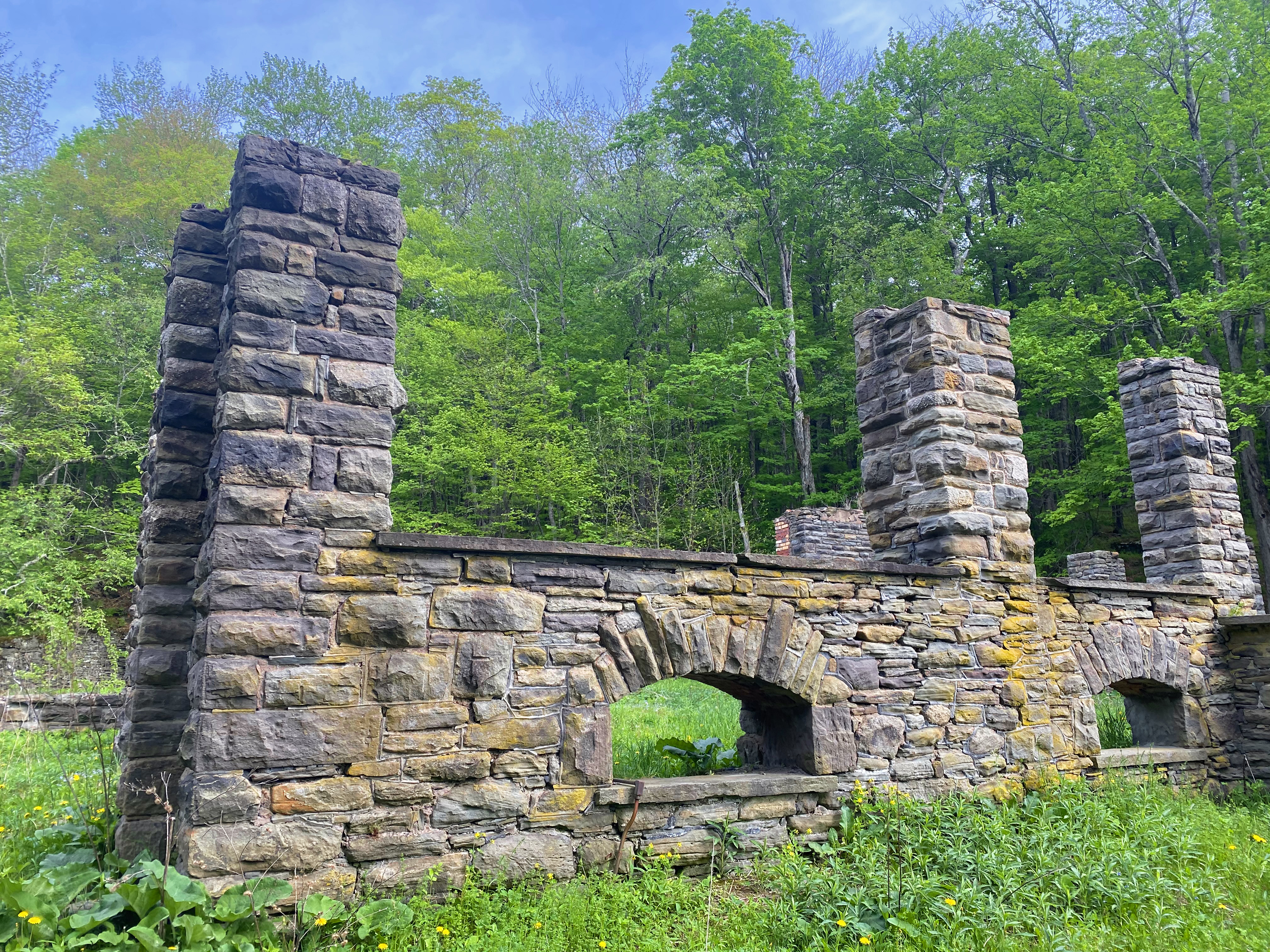
- Ruins of lodge in 2021

- Location within New York Location within the United States
- Nearest city: Hardenburgh, New York
- Coordinates: 42°3′0.24″N 74°40′52.94″W
- Area: 1,610 acres (650 ha)
- Built: 1899
- Architectural style: Bungalow/Craftsman, Shingle Style
- NRHP reference No.: 01001441
- Added to NRHP: January 11, 2002

Coykendall Lodge is a historic home, now in ruins, located at Hardenburgh in Ulster County, New York. It is located on the shores of Alder Lake in the Balsam Lake Wild Forest, part of the Catskill Forest Preserve. It was built in 1899 and was a large, rambling 2 1/2-story half-timber lodge of balloon frame construction. It rests on a limestone foundation and is representative of the Shingle Style.

It was listed on the National Register of Historic Places in 2002.

Since then the Lodge was torn down by the state as it was in such disrepair. Only the stone foundations and cobblestone walls remain.

== See also ==
- National Register of Historic Places listings in Ulster County, New York
