= Lake Lessing =

Lake in Aragatsotn Region, Armenia

- Location within Armenia Location within Caucasus Mountains
- Interactive map of Lake Lessing
- Location: Aragatsotn, Armenia
- Coordinates: 40°31′32″N 44°14′08″E
- Basin countries: Armenia
- Surface area: 0.09 km^{2} (0.035 sq mi)
- Surface elevation: 3,200 m (10,500 ft)

Lake Lessing (Armenian: Լեսինգ (լիճ)) is one of the few natural lakes in Armenia. It is located on the eastern slope of the Aragats mountains at 3200 m. elevation. Alpine plants make up the vegetation in the area.

The lake is about 11 km northwest of Tsaghkashen village.
