= Ökürgön-Köl =

Lake in Kyrgyzstan

- Kyrgyz: Өкүргөн-Көл
- Location within Kyrgyzstan Location within Asia
- Location: Issyk-Kul Region, Jeti-Ögüz District
- Coordinates: 41°43′53″N 77°43′35″E
- Lake type: Dammed
- Etymology: the Moaning Lake in Kyrgyz language
- Catchment area: 54 km^{2} (21 sq mi)
- Basin countries: Kyrgyzstan
- Surface area: 1.15 km^{2} (0.44 sq mi)
- Average depth: 5–6 m (16–20 ft)
- Water volume: 0.006 km^{3} (0.0014 cu mi)
- Surface elevation: 3,628 m (11,903 ft)

Ökürgön-Köl (Kyrgyz: Өкүргөн-Көл) is a mountain lake in Inner Tien-Shan. It is located at an elevation of 3,628 m (11,903 ft) in the Ökürgön basin on the southern slope of the Jetim-Bel Range, along the right tributary of the Taragay River. The lake covers an area of 1.15 km^{2} (0.44 sq mi), with an estimated volume of 0.006 cubic kilometres (0.0014 cu mi). Its catchment area is reported as 54 square kilometres (21 sq mi) according to the Atlas of Kyrgyz Republic while other sources give a value of 33.7 square kilometres (13.0 sq mi). The depth of the lake is 5–6 m (16–20 ft) It is fed by the Sarytör River, which forms from four small glaciers in the upper valley.

The lake basin was formed by glacial activity and lies in a depression dammed by moraines. The outflowing stream joins the Sarytör River and together they form the Ökürgön River.

== Etymology ==
During the 1916 Ürkün, a young woman fleeing toward China with her infant attempted to cross a lake that appeared frozen. As she reached the middle, the ice broke, and she, her child, and her camel drowned. Since then, locals say sorrowful sounds—resembling cries and moans—echo over the lake during winter storms. Because of this tragic story, the lake became known as Ökürgön-Köl, “the Moaning Lake.”
