= Mountain Lake (Ontario) =

Lakes in Ontario, Canada

Mountain Lake (Ontario) may refer to one of a number of lakes in Ontario, Canada with this precise name or to others with similar names.

== Lakes with this name ==
- Mountain Lake (Wawa), Algoma District 47.94479°N 84.7596°W
- Mountain Lake (Finan Township, Algoma District) 48.324722°N 84.454722°W
- Mountain Lake (Lascelles Township, Algoma District) 49.182304°N 84.425104°W
- Mountain Lake (Nameigos Township, Algoma District) 48.7275°N 84.700833°W
- Mountain Lake (North Frontenac), Frontenac County 45.105278°N 76.783056°W
- Mountain Lake (South Frontenac), Frontenac County 44.526111°N 76.414722°W
- Mountain Lake (Meaford), Grey County 44.709227°N 80.69675°W
- Mountain Lake (Georgian Bluffs), Grey County 44.704142°N 81.0496°W
- Mountain Lake (Chatsworth), Grey County 44.317697°N 80.886152°W
- Mountain Lake (Minden Hills), Haliburton County 44.982778°N 78.707778°W
- Mountain Lake (Cardiff Township, Highlands East), Haliburton County 44.911667°N 77.982222°W
- Mountain Lake (Monmouth Township, Highlands East), Haliburton County 45.02856°N 78.24294°W
- Mountain Lake (Hastings County) 45.341585°N 77.685955°W
- Mountain Lake (Rubanoe Lake, Kenora County) 49.450279°N 92.878494°W
- Mountain Lake (Bog Creek, Kenora District) 49.918624°N 94.106335°W
- Mountain Lake (South Algonquin), Nipissing District 45.553055°N 77.815833°W
- Mountain Lake (Butler Township, Nipissing District) 46.493055°N 79.115278°W
- Mountain Lake (Preston Township, Nipissing District) 45.71711°N 78.19865°W
- Mountain Lake (Temagami), Nipissing District 47.230781°N 79.832145°W
- Mountain Lake (Parry Sound District) 45.960833°N 79.867778°W
- Mountain Lake (Peterborough County) 44.69347°N 78.36141°W
- Mountain Lake (Renfrew County) 45.364722°N 77.172222°W
- Mountain Lake (Simcoe County) 44.866244°N 79.657078°W
- Mountain Lake (Sudbury District) 46.57367°N 81.54039°W
- Mountain Lake (Timiskaming District) 47.646566°N 80.227565°W
- Mountain Lake (Vale Creek, Thunder Bay District) 50.232286°N 89.261886°W
- Mountain Lake (Minnesota–Ontario), Thunder Bay District 48.109296°N 90.224686°W
- Mountain Lake (Shuniah), Thunder Bay District 48.703476°N 88.704855°W

== Similarly named lakes ==
- Mountain Island Lake (Kenora County) 49.887695°N 91.090919°W
- Lake on the Mountain (Prince Edward County) 44.03473°N 77.059722°W
- Lake on the Mountain (Haliburton County) 44.981944°N 78.055833°W
- Bear Mountain Lake (Hastings County) 44.716127°N 77.777128°W
- Mountain Ash Lake (Algoma County) 47.053919°N 83.205834°W
- Black Mountain Lake (Thunder Bay County) 49.057971°N 88.72307°W
- Mount Baldy Lake (Algoma County) 47.74359°N 84.30178°W
- Sandy Mountain Lake (Algoma County) 47.5743°N 84.63073°W
- Great Mountain Lake (Sudbury County) 46.158°N 81.358829°W
- Mount Sinclair Lake (Timiskaming County) 47.952405°N 80.951692°W
- Little Mountain Lake (Sudbury County) 46.14422°N 81.36205°W
- Lake on the Mount (Lanark County) 45.160278°N 76.398333°W
- Red Rock Mountain Lake (Renfrew County) 45.675365°N 77.47955°W
- Little Mountain Lake (Nipissing County) 46.493889°N 79.108889°W
- Little Mountain Lake (Timiskaming County) 47.145833°N 79.581389°W
- Mountain Top Lake (District of Algoma County) 46.454722°N 82.815°W
- Little Mountain Lake (Frontenac County) 45.181944°N 76.969167°W
- Three Mount Lake (Thunder Bay County) 49.410845°N 88.538896°W
- Big Mountain Lake (Peterborough County) 44.635278°N 77.989167°W
- Mount Lake (Kenora; Rainy River County) 49.013142°N 92.187084°W
- Mount Lake (Kenora County) 50.695278°N 91.933611°W
- Mount Lake (Algoma County) 46.67505°N 82.7335°W
- Mount Lake (Thunder Bay County) 49.804059°N 89.252088°W
- Northwest Mountain Lake (Kenora County) 49.982851°N 94.241328°W
- Gold Mountain Lake (Kenora County) 49.555023°N 94.730296°W

== See also ==
- List of lakes in Ontario
