= Besh-Tash Lake =

Rock-dammed lake in Talas Province of Kyrgyzstan

- Location within Kyrgyzstan Location within Asia
- Coordinates: 42°12′23″N 72°29′46″E
- Basin countries: Kyrgyzstan
- Max. length: 1.3 km (0.81 mi)
- Max. width: 0.55 km (0.34 mi)
- Surface area: 0.54 km^{2} (0.21 sq mi)
- Average depth: 111 m (364 ft)
- Water volume: 6,000,000 m^{3} (210,000,000 cu ft)
- Surface elevation: 2,994 m (9,823 ft)

Besh-Tash Lake (Kyrgyz: Беш Таш) is a rock-dammed lake in Talas Province of Kyrgyzstan. It is located at the altitude of about 3,000 m in riverbed of Besh-Tash river, left tributary of Talas River.
