= Ahornsee =

Lake in Austria

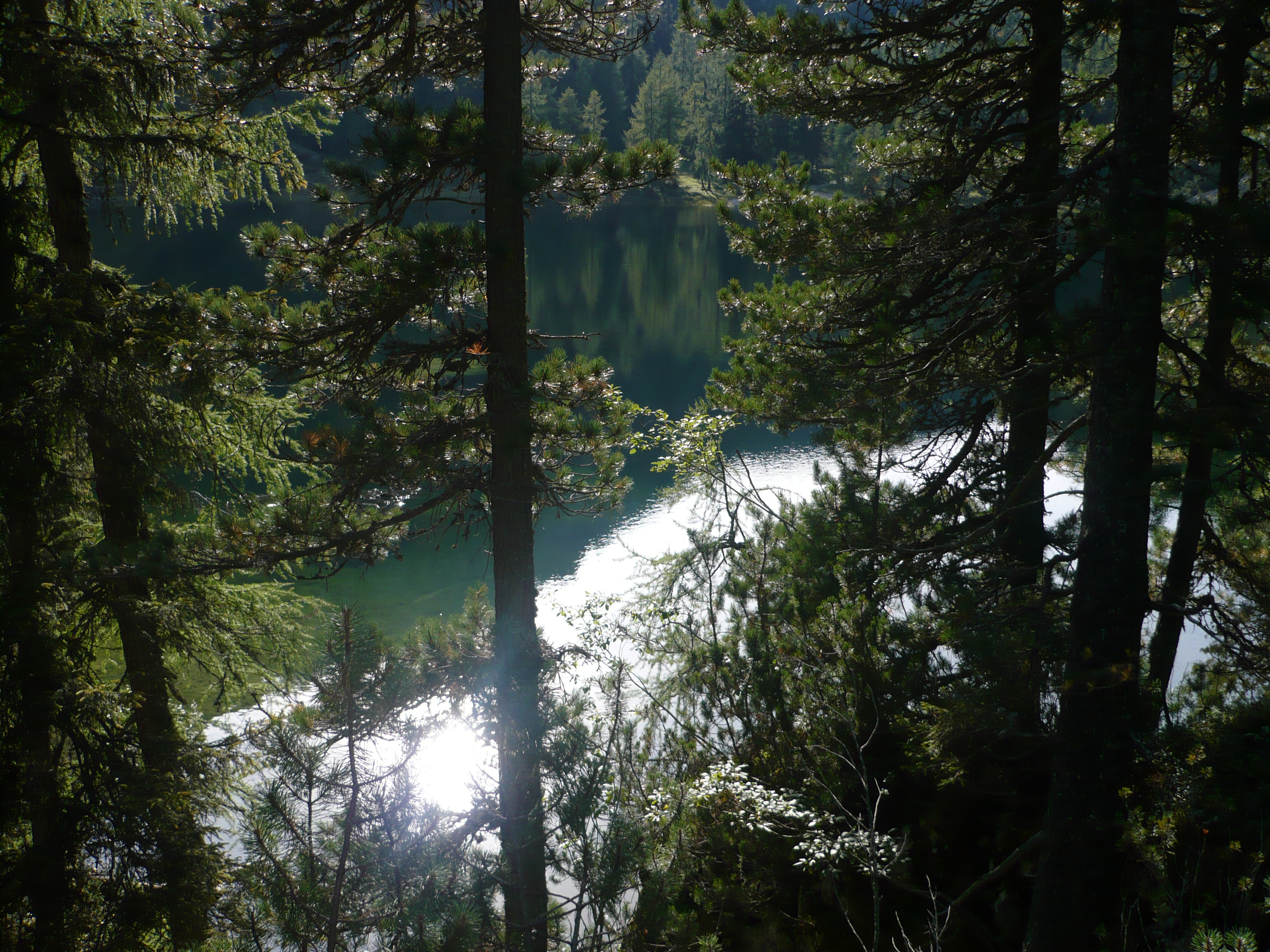

- Location within Austria
- Location: Upper Austria
- Coordinates: 47.4668°N 13.7825°E
- Primary inflows: underground
- Primary outflows: underground

Ahornsee is an oligotrophic lake in the Dachstein Mountains of Upper Austria. It is 1482 meters above sea level and approximately 7 meters deep. Aquatic plants include Ranunculus confervoides, Chara contraria and Potamogeton natans. The western shore has amenities for hikers, including a hut and fire pits.
