= Allen Lake =

Allen Lake may refer to:

- Allen Lake (Minnesota), United States
- Allen Lake (New York), United States
- Allen Lake (Haliburton County), a lake in Haliburton County, Ontario, Canada
