= Kölükök =

MOUNTAIN LAKE IN KYRGYZSTAN

- Location within Kyrgyzstan
- Location: Naryn Region
- Coordinates: 42°5′26″N 75°55′0″E
- Basin countries: Kyrgyzstan
- Max. length: 2.3 km (1.4 mi)
- Surface area: 1.22 km^{2} (0.47 sq mi)
- Max. depth: 17 m (56 ft)
- Surface elevation: 2,970 m (9,740 ft)

Kölükök (Kyrgyz: Көлүкөк) is a mountain lake in the Naryn Region of Kyrgyzstan (Central Asia).

Kölükök is located about 20 km (12 mi) south-southeast of the town Kochkor in the western foothills of the Terskey Ala-too. The approximately 2.5 km long lake with SSE-NNW orientation has an area of 1.22 km^{2} and is located at an altitude of 2970 m. The Ükök, outflow of the lake, initially flows in a north-westerly and later in a northerly direction through the mountains before reaching a plateau, flowing through the town of Kochkor and flowing into the river Chu on the right.

The catchment contains small glaciers with a total area exceeding 7 km². Inflowing water seeps through beneath the rock-debris dam before emerging downstream.

The lake was formed when a trough-shaped valley formerly occupied by a glacier was blocked by moraines and rockfall debris.
