= Alder Lake (New York) =

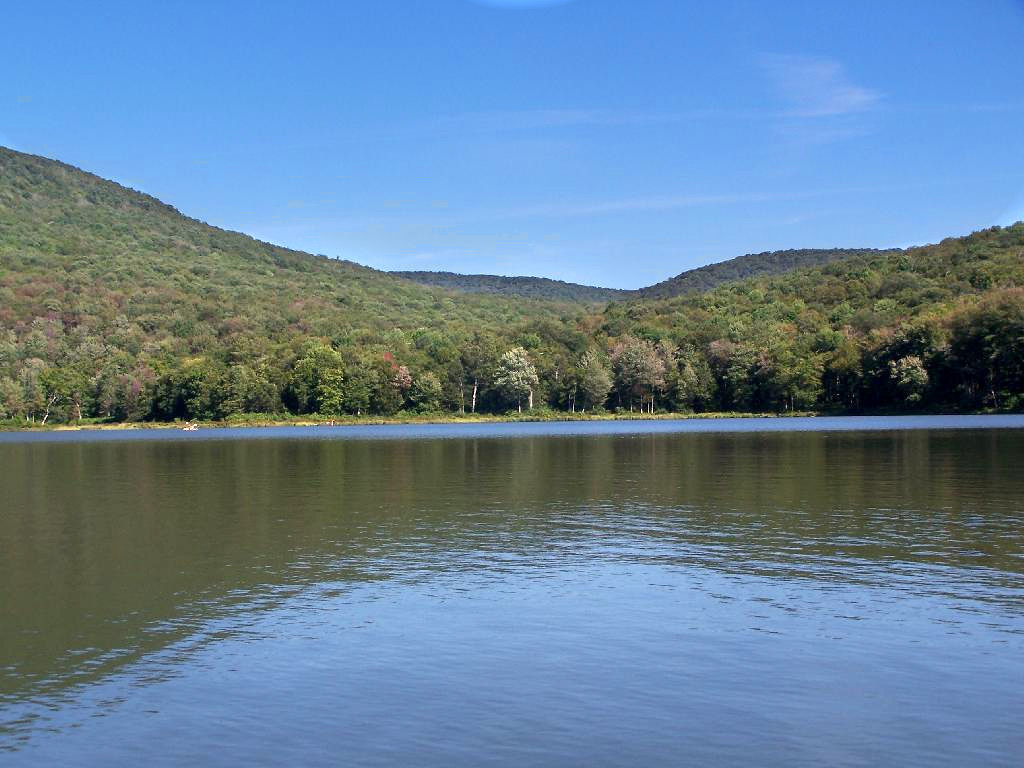
- Alder Lake in 2015

- Location within New York Location within the United States
- Location: Ulster County, New York
- Coordinates: 42°2′56.3″N 74°40′35.6″W
- Type: Lake
- Surface area: 45 acres (18 ha)
- Average depth: 8.9 feet (2.7 m)
- Max. depth: 22 feet (6.7 m)
- Surface elevation: 2,211 feet (674 m)

Alder Lake is a body of water that is located in Hardenburgh, Ulster County in the lower Hudson Valley region of New York. It is located in the Balsam Lake State Forest Preserve, which is a part of the Catskill Forest Preserve. The lake was man made by the Coykendall family in the 1900s. It is most often used for recreational uses and family day trips.

== History ==
Alder Lake was established in 1901 by Samuel D. Coykendall. Coykendall was a strong financer in the area. He owned some of the Delaware and Ulster railroad. Along with the lake, the Coykendall Lodge was put up. It was a 10,900-square foot, three-story house built on a stone foundation. It was built as a summer vacation home for the Coykendall family. After Samuel's death in 1913, his sons took control of his railroad business and inherited the lodge and lake. The land stayed in the Coykendall family until 1945. After the lodge and lake passed through a series of owners, the state eventually bought the land in 1980. In 1988, the lodge was showing deterioration and the New York State Department of Environmental Conservation (NYS DEC) proposed a demolition. The demolition proposal was denied due to public outcry. Even though the lodge stayed standing, the deterioration did not stop. The lodge kept getting worse. Then, in December 2008, the lodge was demolished. Now only the stone foundation is left of the Coykendall lodge. Wint Aldrich, New York Deputy Commissioner for Historic Preservation with the state Office of Parks, Recreation and Historic Preservation, said "We sort of ran out of ideas. If we were able to catch it and find a use 30, 40 years ago when the state bought it, perhaps something could have been done."

== Physical features ==
Alder Lake elevation is 2,211 feet (674 m) above sea level. The mean depth of Alder Lake is 8.9 feet (2.7 m) feet. The max depth of Alder Lake is 22 feet (6.7 m) feet. The lake covers a total of 45 acres (18 ha).

== Recreational uses ==
=== Hiking ===
There is a state maintained/marked trail around the entire lake. The "Alder Lake Loop Trail" is 1.5 miles long. On the east side of the lake, the loop trail connects to the "Mill Brook Ridge Trail" which can be taken east to Balsam Lake Mountain.

=== Fishing ===
There are Brook trout in the lake, but there are special fishing regulations because it is a man-made lake. The fishing season is April 1 through September 30, while the catch limit is only three fish per day. To keep these fish they have to be a minimum of 12 inches long.

=== Swimming ===
Swimming is allowed in Alder Lake. There is no beach or lifeguard.

=== Boating ===
Non-motorized boats are allowed on Alder Lake.

=== Camping ===
Camping is available for people interested in staying overnight. There are 7-10 primitive camp sites. Camping is on a first-come, first-served basis.
