= Mountain Lake (Delaware County, New York) =

Lake in New York, United States

- Location of Mountain Lake within New York
- Location: Delaware County, New York
- Coordinates: 41°57′08″N 74°59′00″W
- Surface elevation: 1,181 feet (360 m)
- Settlements: Cooks Falls

Mountain Lake is a small lake in the hamlet of Cooks Falls in Delaware County, New York. It drains into Beaver Kill.

== See also ==
- List of lakes in New York
