= Lac de Mâl =

Lake

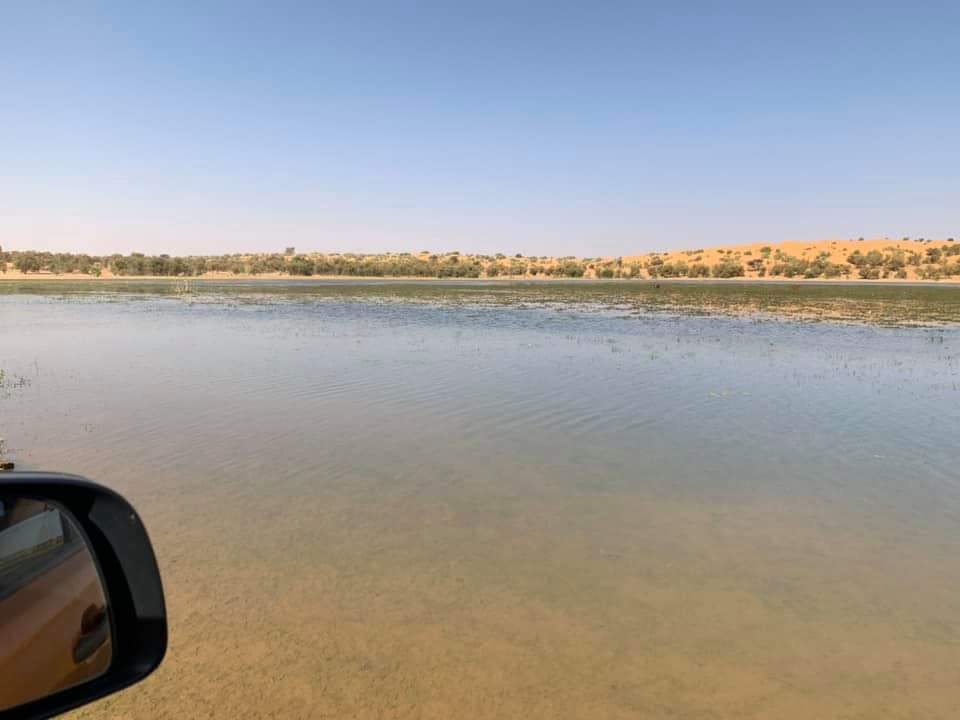
- Lac de Mâl en 2020

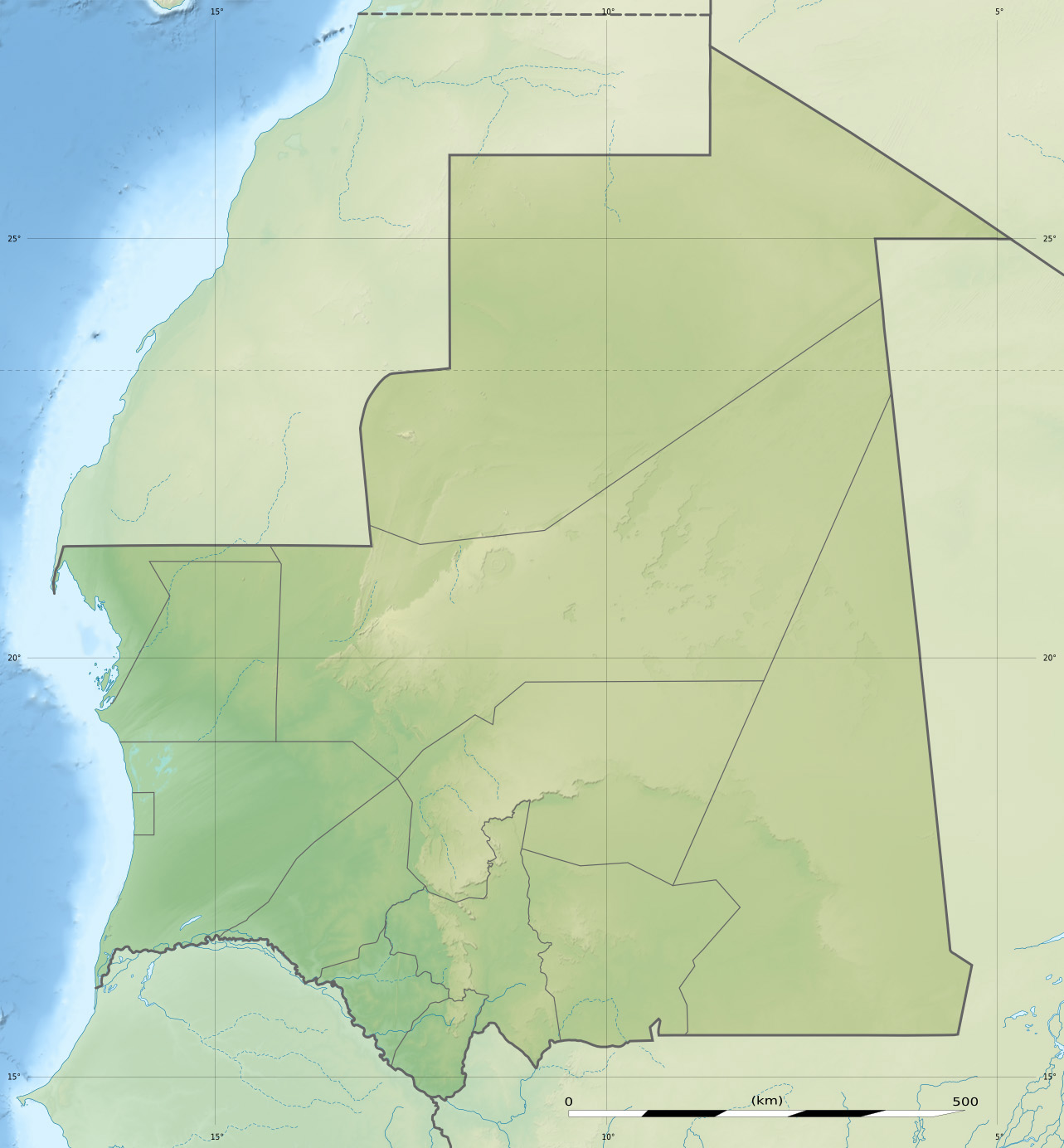
- Location within Mauritania
- Location: Mauritania
- Coordinates: 16°55′26″N 13°23′56″W

The Lac de Mâl is a lake in Mauritania's Brakna Region, 65 km (40 mi) east south-east of Aleg. The lake is permanent and is fed mainly by the Oued Leye. Its area varies between 5,250 hectares (13,000 acres) at the end of the rainy season to around 870 hectares (2,100 acres). It is an important habitat for various species of birds.

== Sources ==
- Map E-28-XXIX
