= Karrakatta Valley =

Valley in South Georgia

Karrakatta Valley (54°10′S 36°43′W) is a short valley trending west-northwest from Husvik Harbor, Stromness Bay, South Georgia. It was named after the hulk Karrakatta on a slipway at the abandoned whaling station at the head of Husvik Harbor. Built in Oslo in 1912, she served as a whale catcher off Western Australia, and was last used at the slipway to provide steam to the adjacent engineering shop, probably until 1959. The valley was named by the UK Antarctic Place-Names Committee in 1990.

Block Lake within the valley was dammed and served as a reservoir for the old Husvik whaling station. It was named in 1990 by UK-APC after William C. Block, invertebrate zoologist.
