= Zarzar Lake =

- Location within Syria
- Location: Syria
- Coordinates: 33°36′59″N 36°2′37″E
- Type: lake

Zarzar Lake is a lake located 30 kilometres (19 mi) northwest of Damascus, Syria. It is lies to the east of Haloua. In the northeastern part of the lake is a dam.
