= Jetim-Bel Range =

Mountain range in Kyrgyzstan

- Location within Kyrgyzstan

Highest point
- Peak: Söök Peak
- Elevation: 4,627 m (15,180 ft)
- Coordinates: 41.45°N 77.40°E

Dimensions
- Length: 102 km (63 mi)
- Width: 12 km (7.5 mi)

Naming
- Native name: Жетимбел кырка тоосу (Kyrgyz)

Geography
- Country: Kyrgyzstan
- Region: Inner Tien Shan

Geology
- Orogeny: Alpine orogeny
- Rock age(s): Upper Proterozoic; uplift during Neogene–Quaternary
- Rock type(s): Granite, granite-diorite, phyllite, quartzite, crystalline limestone, dolomite, marbleized limestone

The Jetim-Bel Range (Kyrgyz: Жетимбел кырка тоосу) is a mountain range in the Inner Tien Shan of Kyrgyzstan. It forms a meganticline separating the basins of the Chong-Naryn and Kichi-Naryn rivers, extending 102 kilometres (63 mi) east–west from the bend of the Arabel River to the Ayköl Pass. The range has an average elevation of about 4,170 metres (13,680 ft), reaching a maximum height of 4,627 metres (15,180 ft) at Söök Peak.

== Topography ==
The range is relatively even, lacking sharply protruding peaks. Its slopes are steep and deeply dissected by trough-shaped valleys with cirque basins at their heads. Numerous geomorphological features—ancient peneplains, glacial boulders, and stepped valleys—testify to extensive past glaciation.

The relative height above the Arabel and Upper Naryn valleys in the east is 600 to 1,000 m (2,000 to 3,300 ft), while in the west the range rises 1,000 to 1,200 m (3,300 to 3,900 ft) above the Burkan and Archaly valleys.

== Geology ==
The range consists primarily of Upper Proterozoic granites, granite-diorites, phyllites, quartzites, and crystalline limestones. The Söök section contains marbleized and dolomitic limestones along with graphite-bearing phyllites. These ancient formations were uplifted during the Neogene–Quaternary periods, creating the present high-mountain relief.

== Glaciers ==
The Jetim-Bel Range is glaciated, with glaciers occupying a total area of 84.6 square kilometres (32.7 sq mi). Glaciation increases eastward, and the upper parts of many valleys terminate in cirques shaped by past and present glacial activity.

== Passes ==
Major passes shaped by glacial processes include:

- Jetim-Bel Pass – 3,993 metres (13,100 ft)
- Söök Pass – 4,022 metres (13,196 ft)
- Sarytör Pass – 4,050 metres (13,290 ft)
- Kyzyl-Suu Pass – 3,975 metres (13,041 ft)

== Landscapes ==
On the southern slopes, the vegetation zones include semi-desert at elevations of 3,200 to 3,600 m (10,500 to 11,800 ft), dry steppe at 3,300 to 3,900 m (10,800 to 12,800 ft), alpine meadows at 3,800 to 4,000 m (12,500 to 13,100 ft), and glacial–nival landscapes above 4,000 m (13,000 ft).

The northern slopes are characterized by meadow-steppe at 3,700 to 3,900 m (12,100 to 12,800 ft), subnival landscapes at 3,600 to 3,800 m (11,800 to 12,500 ft), and glacial–nival zones above 4,000 m (13,000 ft).
