= Tsaghkashen, Aragatsotn =

Village in Aragatsotn, Armenia

Tsaghkashen Ծաղկաշեն
- Location within Armenia Location within Aragatsotn
- Coordinates: 40°30′29″N 44°20′59″E
- Country: Armenia
- Province: Aragatsotn
- Municipality: Aparan
- Elevation: 1,950 m (6,400 ft)

Population (2020)
  - Total: 418
- Time zone: UTC+4
  - Summer (DST): UTC+5

Tsaghkashen (Armenian: Ծաղկաշեն), until 1950 known as Takyarlu and Takiarli, is a village in the Aparan Municipality of the Aragatsotn Province of Armenia. It is located in the Aparan district.
