= Alden Lake =

Lake in the state of Minnesota, United States

- Location within Minnesota
- Location: St. Louis County, Minnesota
- Coordinates: 47°03′40″N 92°01′58″W
- Primary inflows: Cloquet River
- Primary outflows: Cloquet River
- Basin countries: United States
- Surface area: 180 acres (73 ha) littoral area: 159 acres (64 ha)
- Max. depth: 29 ft (8.8 m)

Alden Lake (aka Big Alden Lake) is a freshwater 180-acre lake with 159 (88%) acres of littoral area and a maximum depth of 29 feet located in northern Minnesota 14 miles northeast of Duluth off St. Louis County Highway #44. Alden does not have a developed public access along the shoreline but can be accessed by canoe through the Cloquet River. The primary fish management species are walleye, with secondary management for largemouth bass and smallmouth bass.

== History ==
=== Early Logging Operations ===
By the 1890s, lumbermen, including Frederick Weyerhaeuser, had begun timbering the vast pine forests north of Lake Superior. Initially, the massive pine logs were floated down the entire length of the often frozen and perilous Cloquet River to the City of Cloquet, Minnesota via the Saint Louis River. This means of transporting the timber was obviously less than ideal, and in 1901, M. Joseph Scanlon and Lester Brooks formed the Brooks-Scanlon Lumber Company and planned to improve the transport of the large timber stands they controlled along the Cloquet River by building a sorting works and rail operation at Alden Lake.

=== Construction of Railway and Sorting Works ===
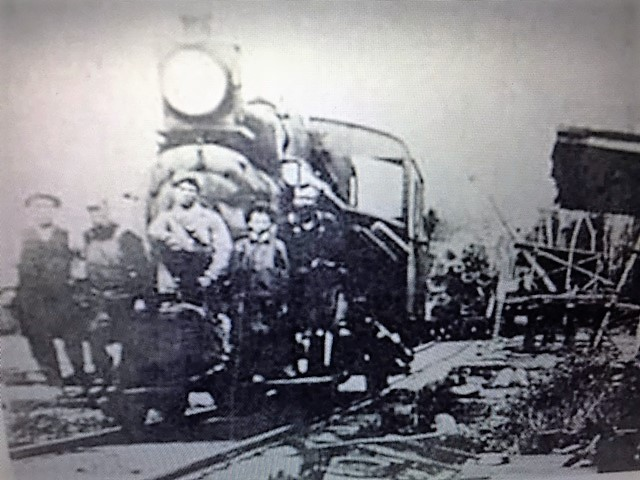
Alden Lake Hoist c. 1906

Cloquet lumbermen under Weyerhaeuser's direction objected to this plan, however, claiming that the Alden Lake sorting works would interfere with the floating of their logs beyond it to Cloquet. Brooks-Scanlon argued that the additional expense and extended delivery time of water transport made rail shipment imperative. In condemnation proceedings brought in 1904, the courts agreed, and Brooks-Scanlon proceeded with their plans. In partnership with the Minnesota and North Wisconsin Railroad (1898-1912), a main rail line was constructed from Brooks-Scanlon's mill in Scanlon, Minnesota to Carolon, 44.5 miles to the northeast. In 1904, a 3.5-mile branch of this line was built from Alden Junction to Alden Lake, to which logs were floated from upstream. At Alden Lake, a logging dam was constructed and a hoist was erected to load logs onto rail cars. At the peak of its operation, Brooks-Scanlon employed approximately 1500 men and harvested a record-breaking amount of board feet of pine. Over a century later, many pine logs from the sorting operation rest on the lake bottom or remain partially submerged.

=== Dismantling of Railway ===
Most of the timber was removed by 1909, and the mill in Scanlon was dismantled the year after. Between 1909 and 1912, the Minnesota and North Wisconsin Railroad was operated by Weyerhaeuser's Johnson-Wentworth Lumber Company for movement of logs to its mill in Cloquet. In 1911, 19.6 miles of line east of Alden Junction was abandoned, leaving only the 34.5 miles of main line to Scanlon. At that time, there were only three locomotives, 16 cars and one caboose left in operation. In 1912, the Minnesota and North Wisconsin was abandoned altogether.

== See also ==
- List of Minnesota lakes
