= Muanenguba Lakes =

Cameron lakes

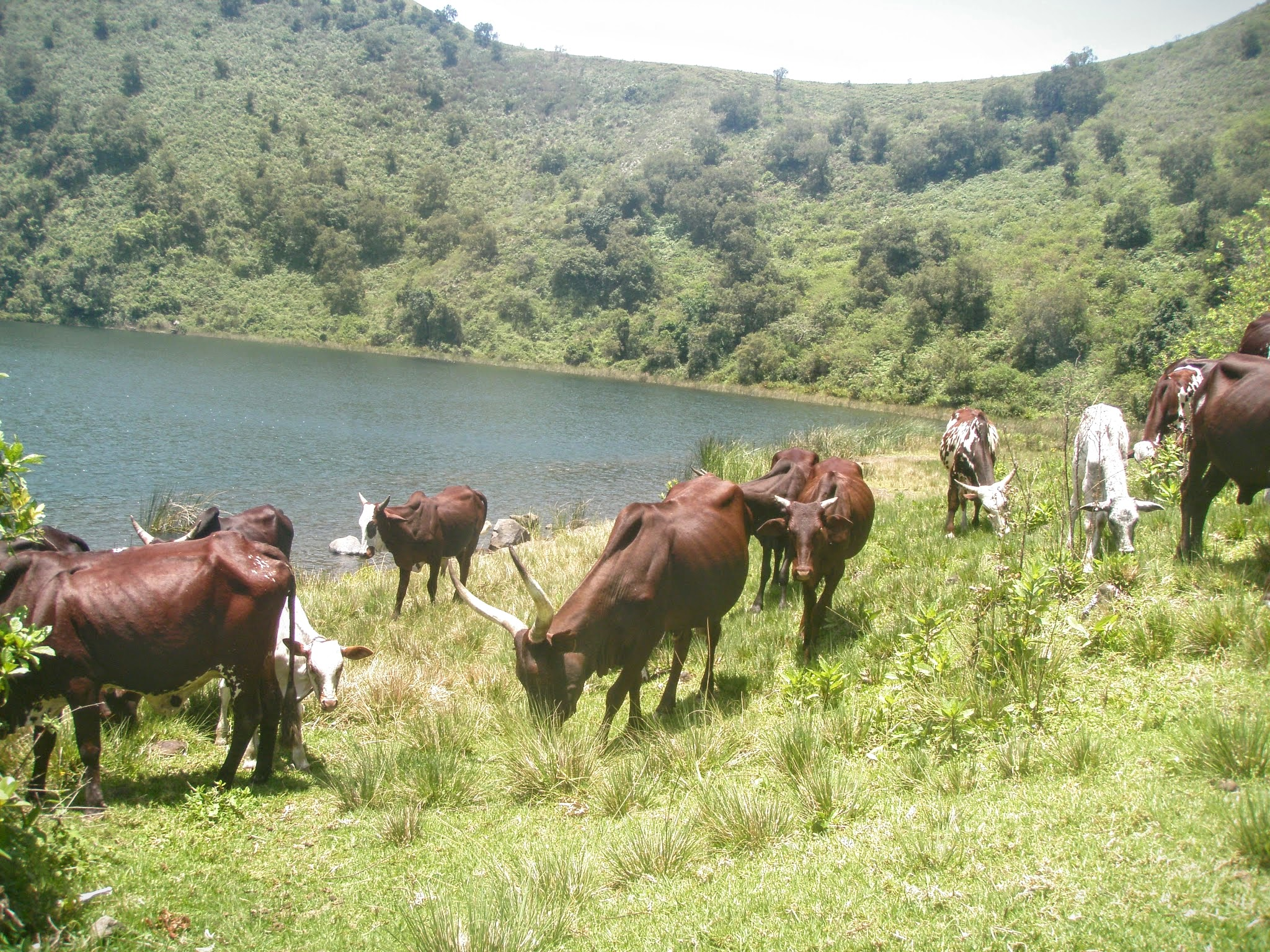
- Grazing cattle at Muanenguba Lakes in Cameroon

- Location within Cameroon Location within Africa
- Interactive map of Muanenguba Lakes
- Location: Mount Manengouba
- Coordinates: 5.0360°N 9.8302°E
- Type: Caldera lakes
- Basin countries: Cameroon
- Max. depth: 5 metres (16 ft)
- Surface elevation: 1,900 metres (6,200 ft)
- Settlements: Bangem

Muanenguba lakes are a pair of caldera lakes on Mount Manengouba found in Bangem subdivision in the Kupe-muanenguba Division of the Southwest region of Cameroon. Surrounded by a park of vegetation, it is bounded by the neighboring Littoral region in Cameroon.

They sit at an elevation of 6,300 feet (1,900 meters).
