= Mountain Lake (Minnesota–Ontario) =

Lake in the state of Minnesota, United States and in Ontario, Canada

- Location within Minnesota
- Location: Cook County, Minnesota and Thunder Bay District, Ontario
- Coordinates: 48°6′13″N 90°14′0″W
- Type: lake

Mountain Lake is a lake in Cook County, Minnesota, in the United States and Thunder Bay District, Ontario, Canada.

Mountain Lake lies between Moose Mountain and Mount Reunion, hence the name.

== See also ==
- List of lakes in Minnesota
