= Dornych shopping center =

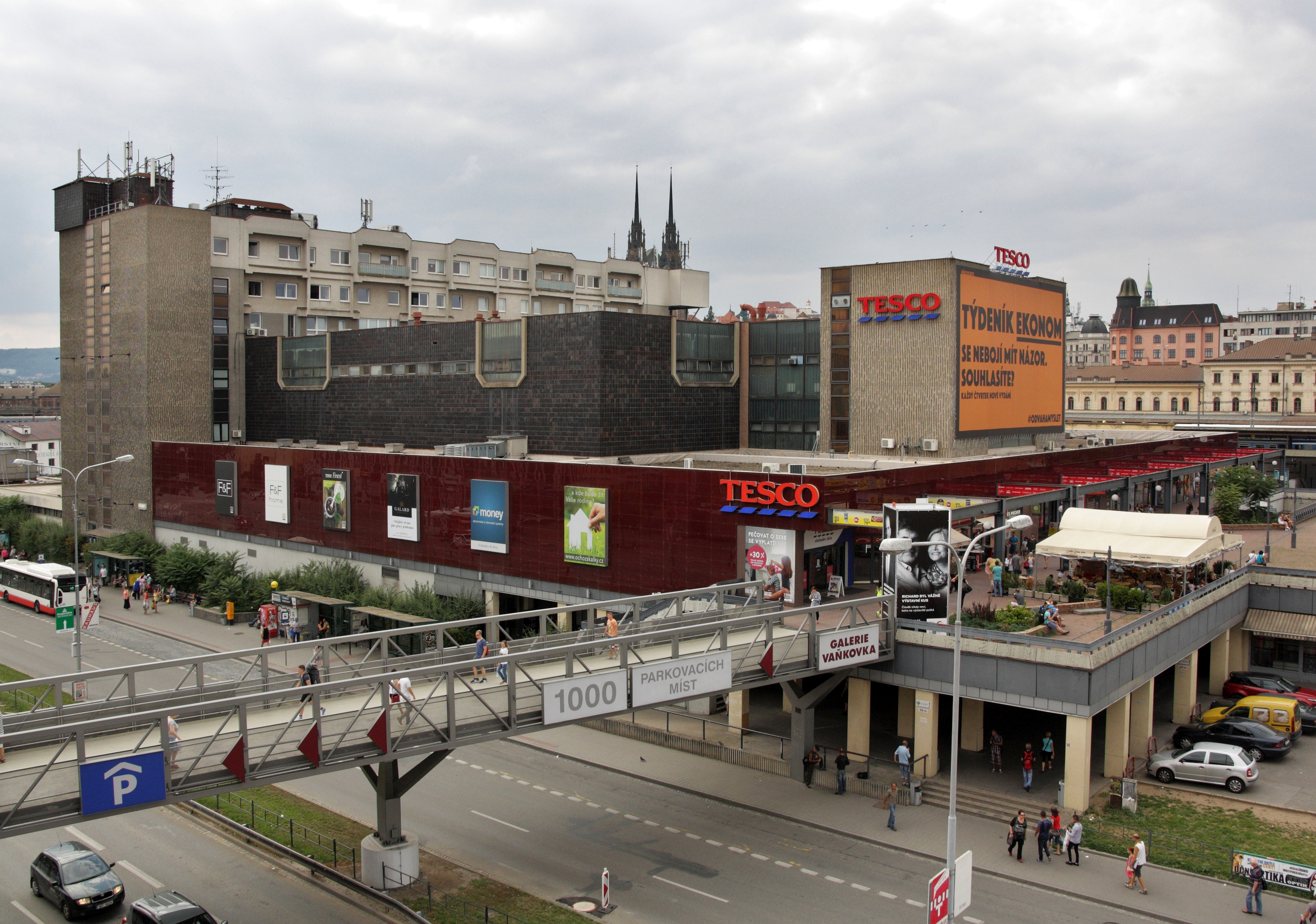
- Building from the east
- Former names: PRIOR, Tesco

General information
- Location: Brno, Czech Republic
- Coordinates: 49.1895°N 16.6129°E

Design and construction
- Architects: Zdeněk Řihák, Zdeněk Sklepek, Jan Melichar

Dornych shopping center (originally Prior department store, later K-Mart and Tesco) was a building located in Brno, near the main railway station, in the vicinity of Úzká and Dornych streets, in the Trnitá district, in the former suburb of Náhon. The building was opened in 1984, as the Prior department store. It was designed by architects Zdeněk Řihák and Zdeněk Sklepek, in the 1990s the building was rebuilt under the direction of Jan Melichar. The building is approximately in the shape of a block, in the front part extended to the original staircase and a newer commercial parterre. At the back, the block of the building is surrounded by a ring, which is formed by a staircase and offices above the shopping center. The lower part is lined with burgundy sheet metal parts, the original block with a dark brown tile, the rest consists of gray concrete lining or glass elements. The building was demolished in 2025.

== History ==
=== The new center of Brno ===
During the mid-1960s, two Brno architects, Ivan Ruller and Zdeněk Řihák began working on one of the possible designs for a new Brno regional center, then still under the supervision of the Brno State Design Institute and the Chief Architect's Office. Milan Záhorský, Stanislav Prokeš and Jan Říha also collaborated with them. The new regional center was to replace the historic core of the city. This no longer met the demands for trade at the time. In addition, its infrastructure was congested with car traffic. The proposal expanded the existing city to the south and a freight station was to be built in front of the Hotel Grand and the railway in the direction of the buildings of the former Friedrich Wannieck factory (today's Vaňkovka Gallery).

At the end of the 1960s, it seemed that construction would begin, as a permit was obtained, but its implementation was prevented by the occupation of Czechoslovakia by Warsaw Pact troops. The new center was no longer implemented and the original plan was reduced to only one shopping center.

=== Prior department store ===
Due to the insufficient capacity of sales outlets in the center, architects Zdeněk Řihák and Zdeněk Sklepek were able to design a new form of the department store in 1975. The building was located near the main train station. Construction began in 1980, and four years later, on November 30, 1984, the Prior department store was inaugurated. To prevent pedestrians from bypassing the entire station, an underpass was built leading from the department store under the station towards the city. It is possible to get off at the tram stop Main station, but it ends in Josefská street. Its author is the architect Otakar Maděra.

=== Last reconstruction ===
The building was last renovated in the 1990s. Jan Melichar proposed its partial adaptation to the needs of the time. This created a steel extension characterized by its burgundy color, which expanded the retail space.

=== Demolition plan ===
In 2017, Tesco department store was bought by the Crestyl development group. As it turned out, the goal was to demolish the building and build a new center with apartments, shops, and offices in its place. In April 2021, the investor requested demolition. This should happen within two years.

== Description ==
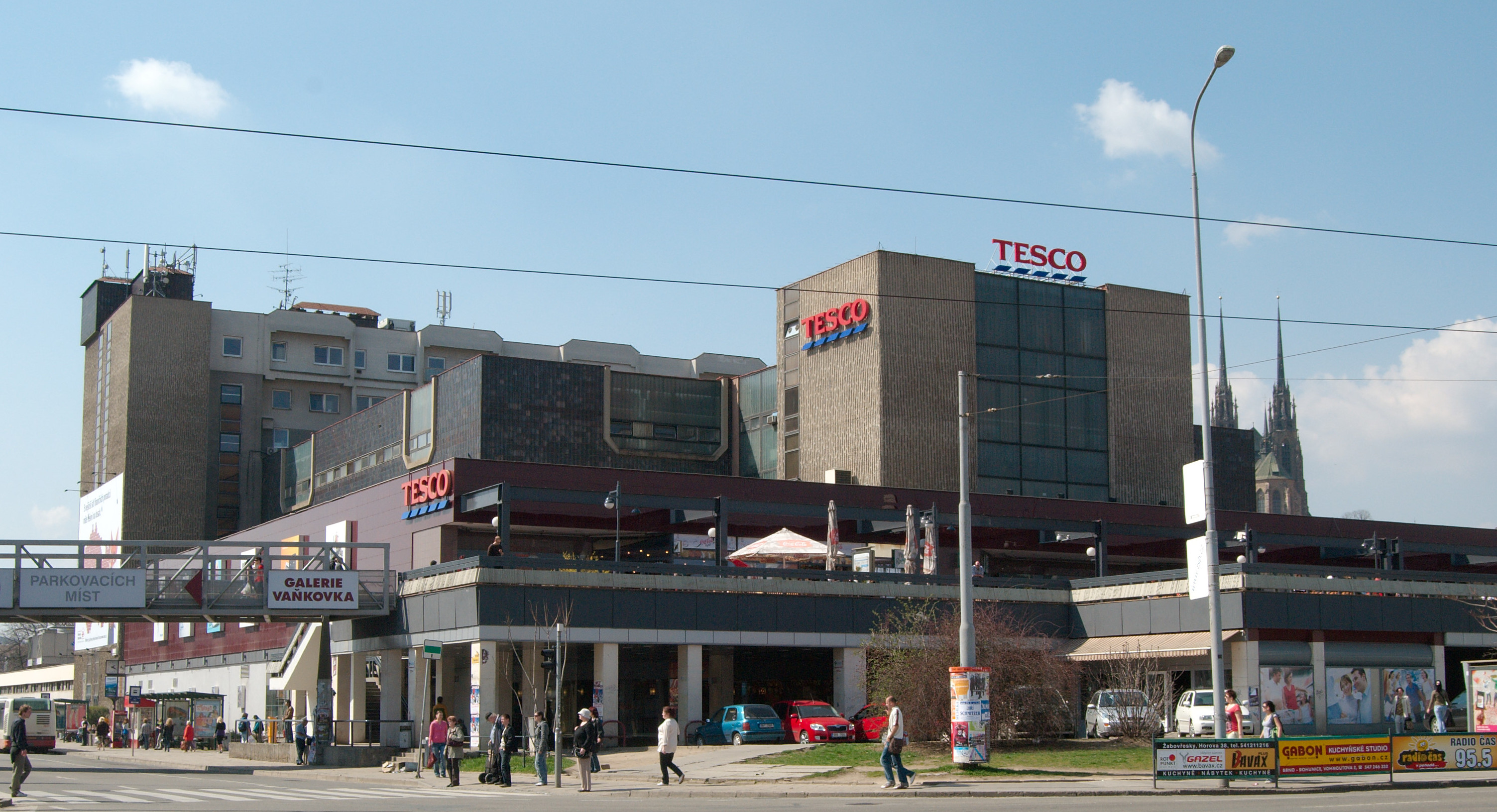
Shopping center in front, without tarpaulin

It is a six-story building with a rectangular floor plan, which is formed by several parts of unequal height. The highest is the ring surrounding the main block of the building from the 1980s, in which there are stairs on the sides and above the main part of the department store there are three floors of offices. The building of the original building is three floors lower. On the first and second floors, there are shops, the third floor is inaccessible and originally there were rooms for apprentices who learned and worked in the operation. This part has the shape of a block with a neck leading to the stair tower in the direction of Dornych street. The newest part of the department store from the 1990s is on the first floor and surrounds the original block and staircase. It starts from the stair tower carrying the office bridge, surrounds the commercial part of the building itself, the neck to the staircase, the staircase itself, and returns around the north side, where it ends at the beginning of the main block. Between this exit and the staircase on the north side, there is a free space – a terrace. On the ground floor of the building, in the western part, there is a courtyard and a space for handling goods, partially protruding beyond the block of the main part – on the opposite side, i.e. the eastern is stretched into a walking porch to which is pulled the main stream of people heading either from the center of the town or from the Vaňkovka shopping center. In addition to the operational part, there is also a supermarket on the ground floor.

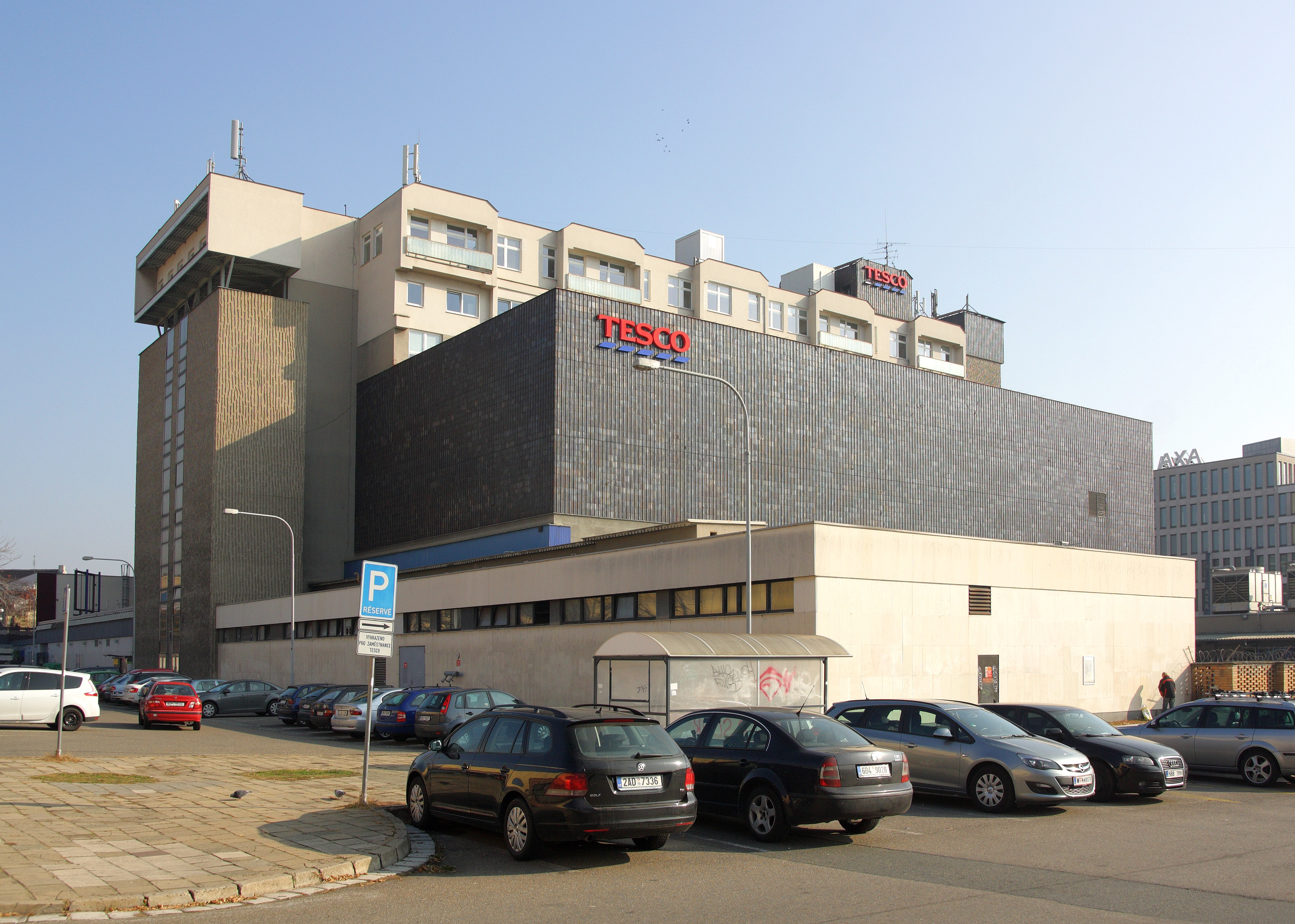
Rear view

A special chapter is an increase of access to the department store to the first floor, which is related to the original concept of the new city center, which planned to elevate the pedestrian area by one floor and traffic in the corridors below. Visitors coming from the center must leave the escalators after leaving the underpass under the central station, or ascend to the piazza in front of the main entrance to the department store. On the other side are a staircase and a footbridge connecting Dornych with Vaňkovka.

The facades of the house are either only plastered and painted white, or covered with decorative tiles. The ground floor and the part with offices are only painted white. All three stair towers are lined with square cement panels, which are decorated with vertical notches visible from a distance. The main block of the shopping center is covered with a dark brown vertically notched tile, and the newest ground floor is then lined with square burgundy pieces. The main staircase is illuminated by a Copilit glass, which covers the entire neck connecting the staircase with the main building, and is located on the third floor of the main part where the façade is broken by raised U-shaped concrete lines. Two of them are south-facing connected by a line of smaller windows. The third is then east on the south side. The stairs connecting all floors are illuminated from the outside by a vertical double row of square windows, glass with sun protection foils, which are set in aluminum frames. The original elevated walking areas to the east are bordered by a metal railing, on which are attached concrete decorative pieces by sculptor Milan Buřival. In this walking part, steel beams in the shape of the letter I support the newly built commercial parterre.

== Gallery ==
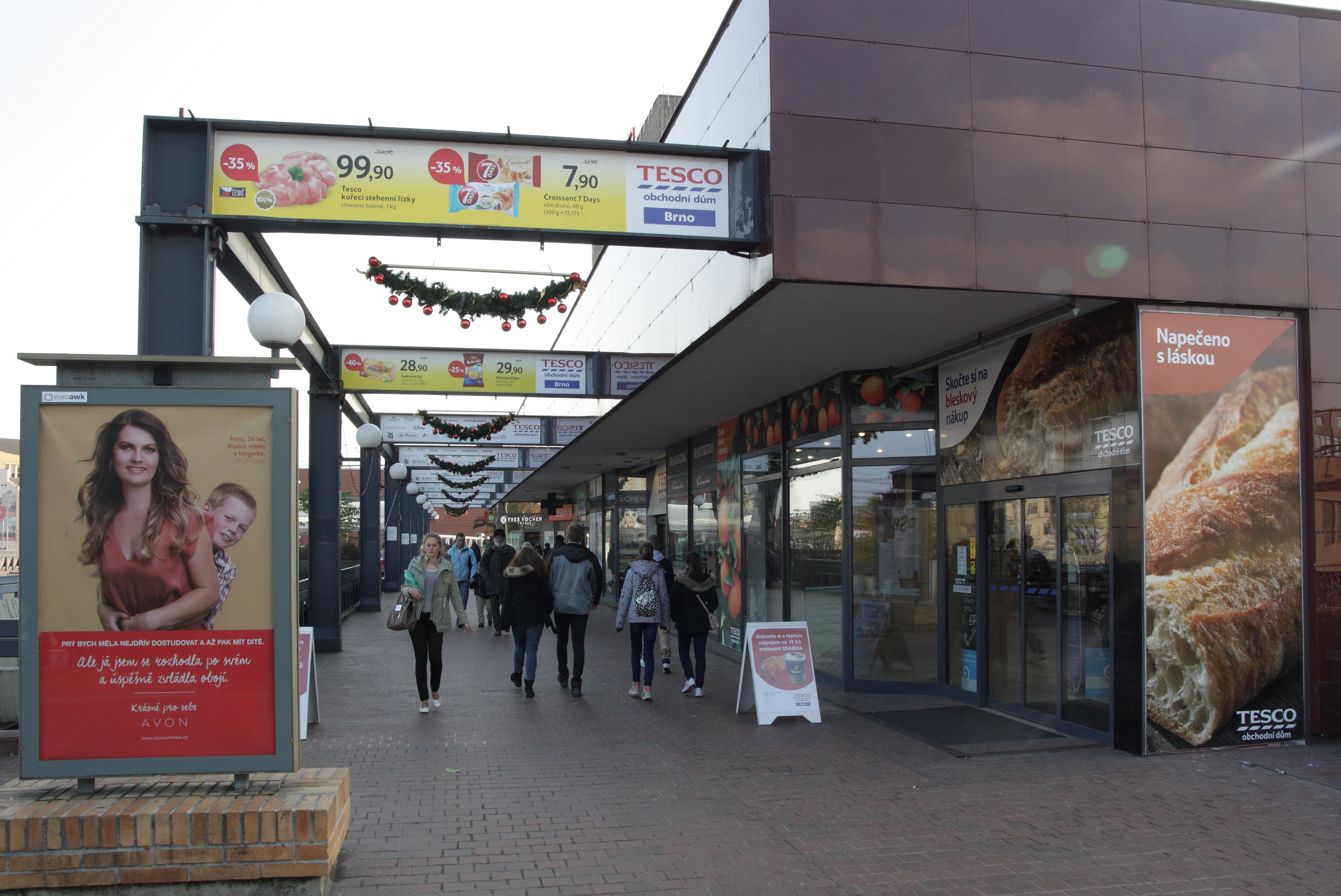
A newer part from the 90s

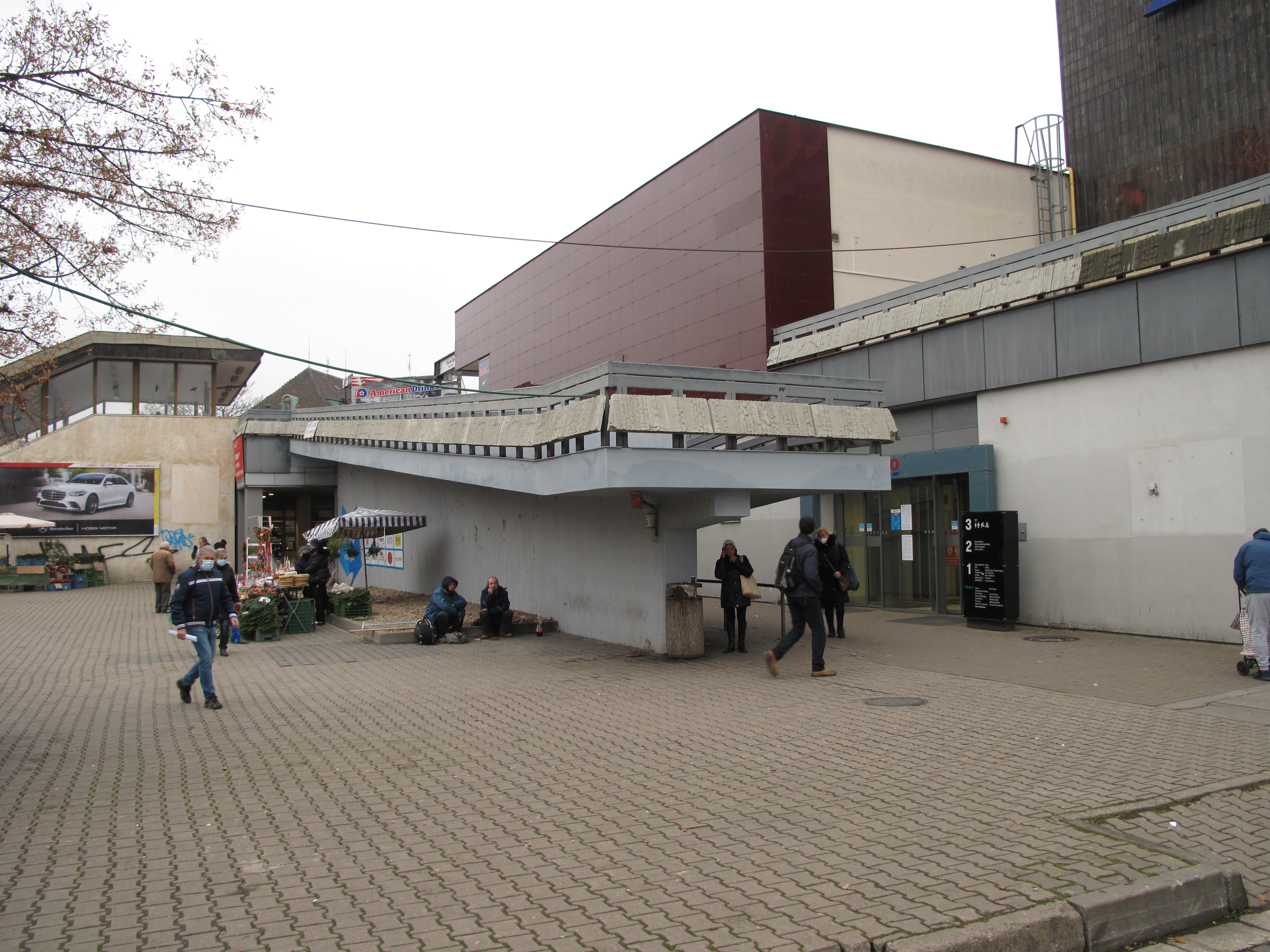
View from the north of the barrier-free ramp with concrete cladding railings

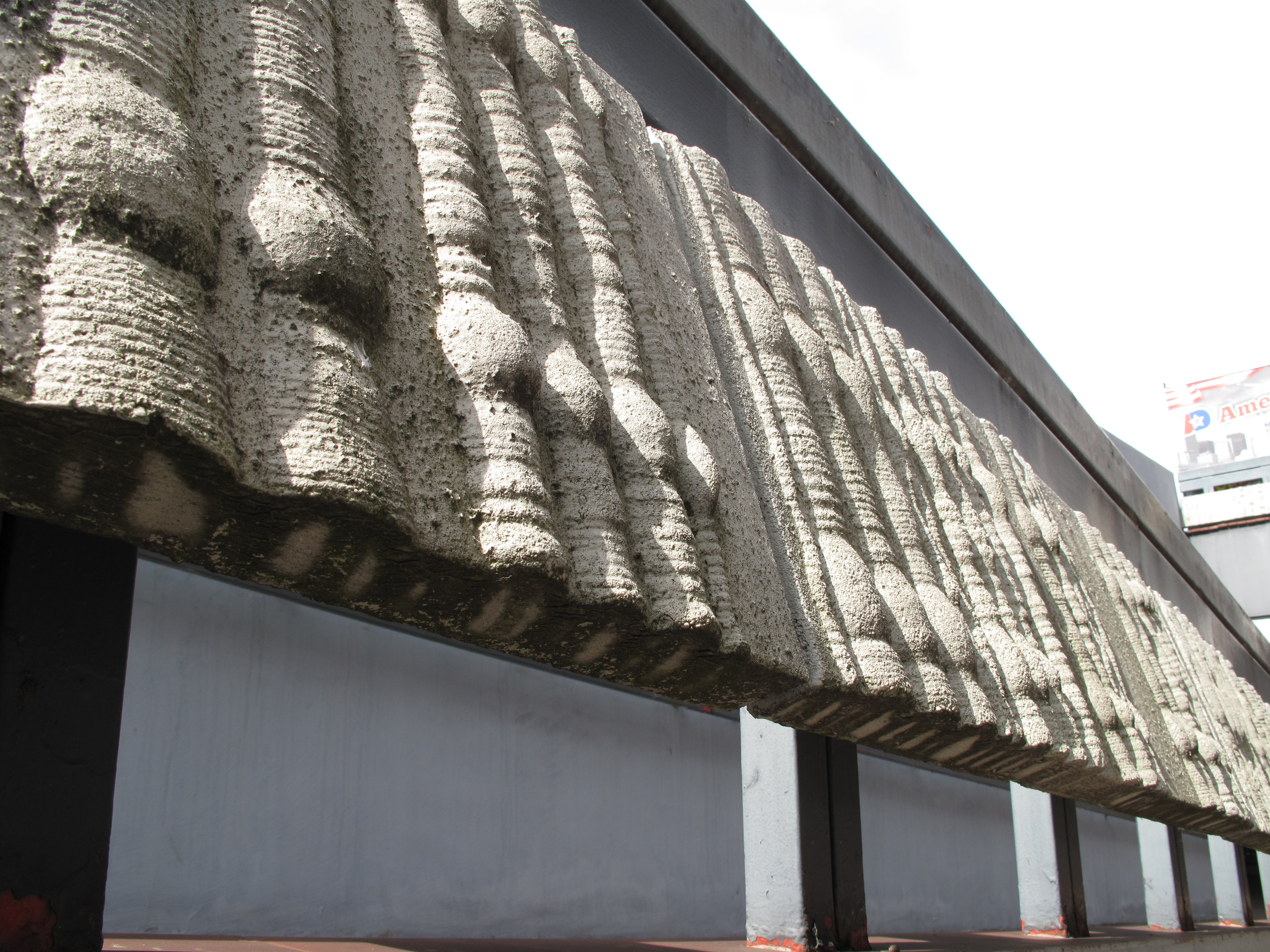
Detail of concrete cladding by Milan Buřival

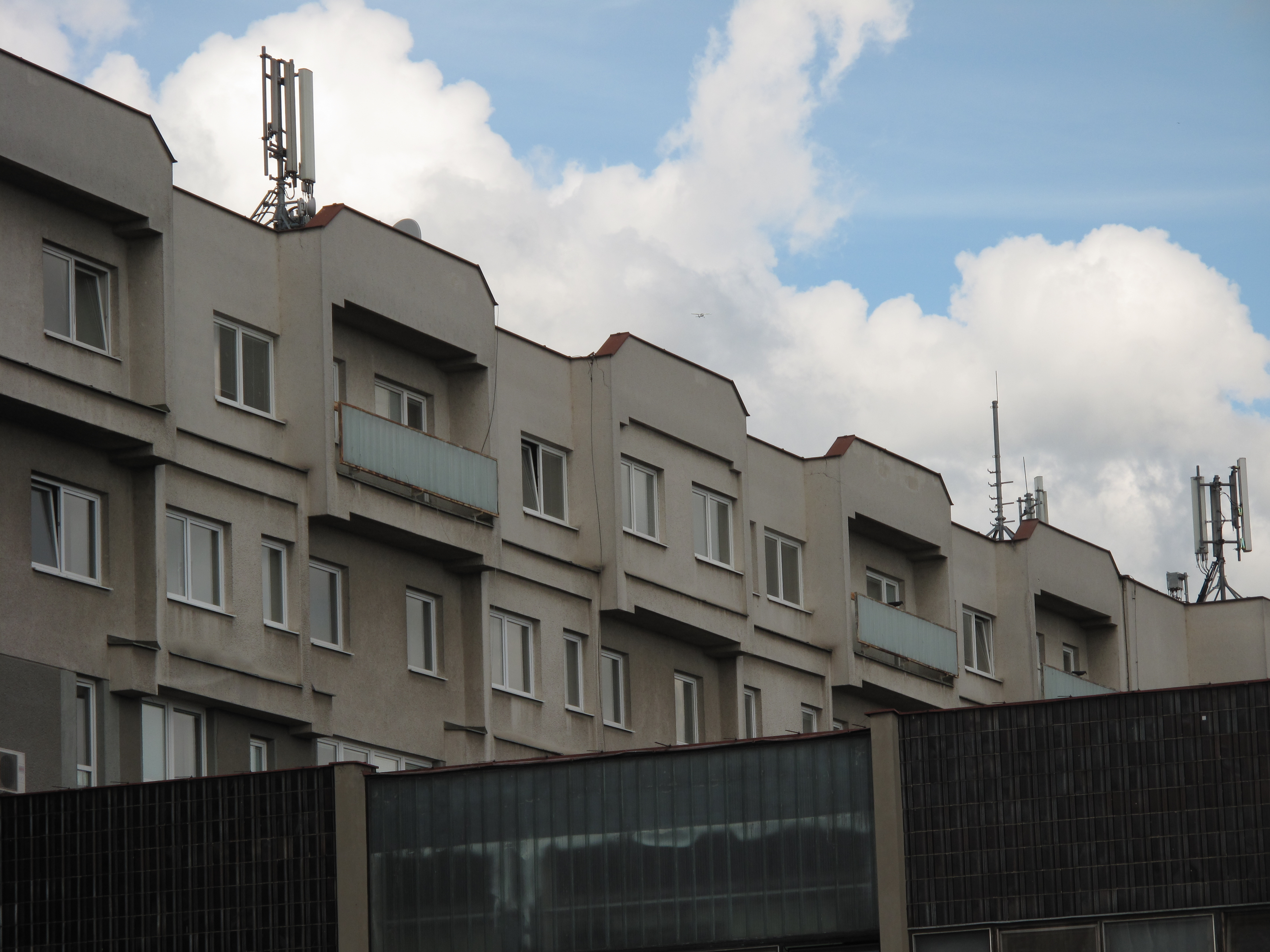
Detail of offices in a ring circuit

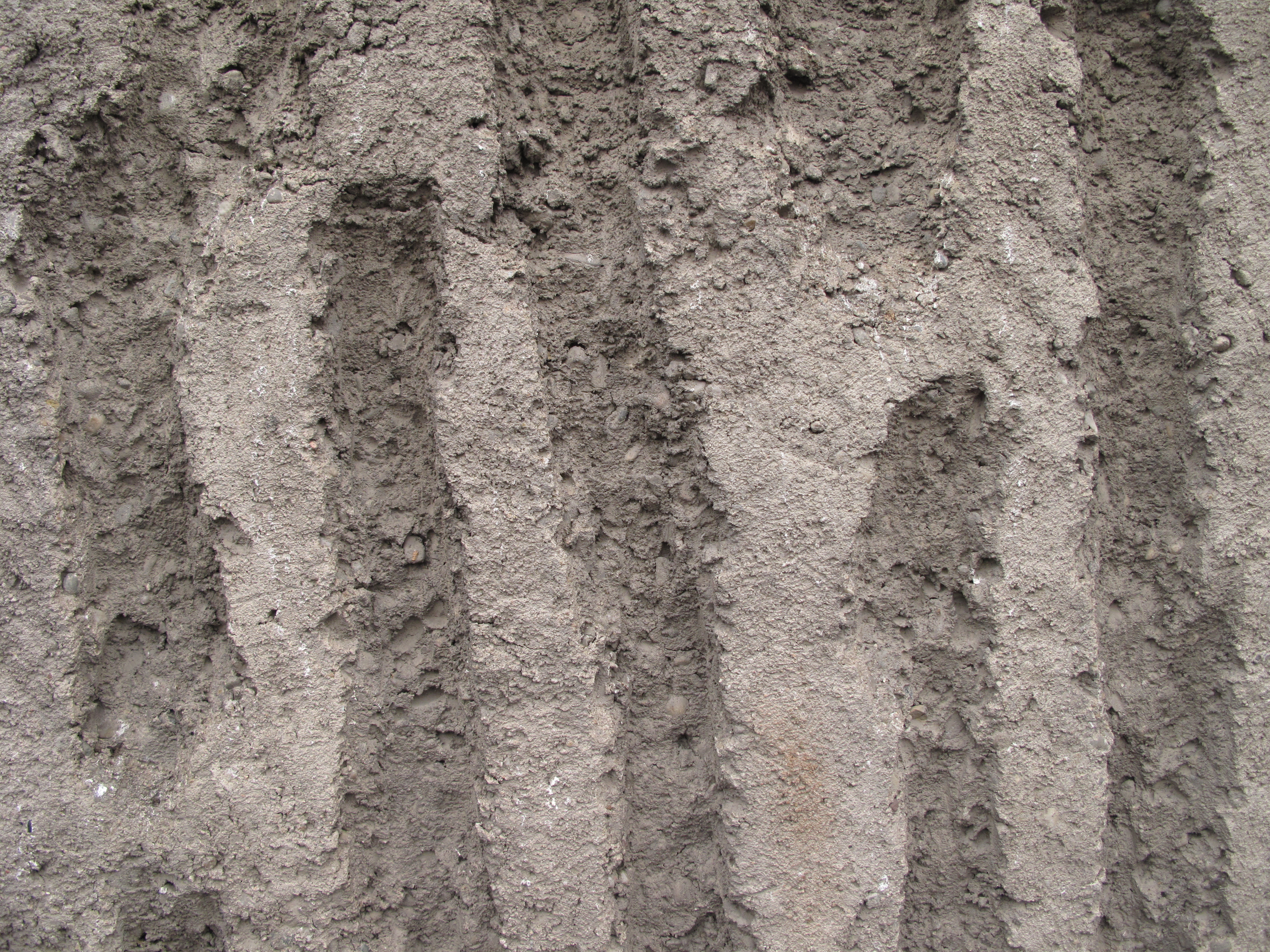
Scratches in the cement lining of stair sections

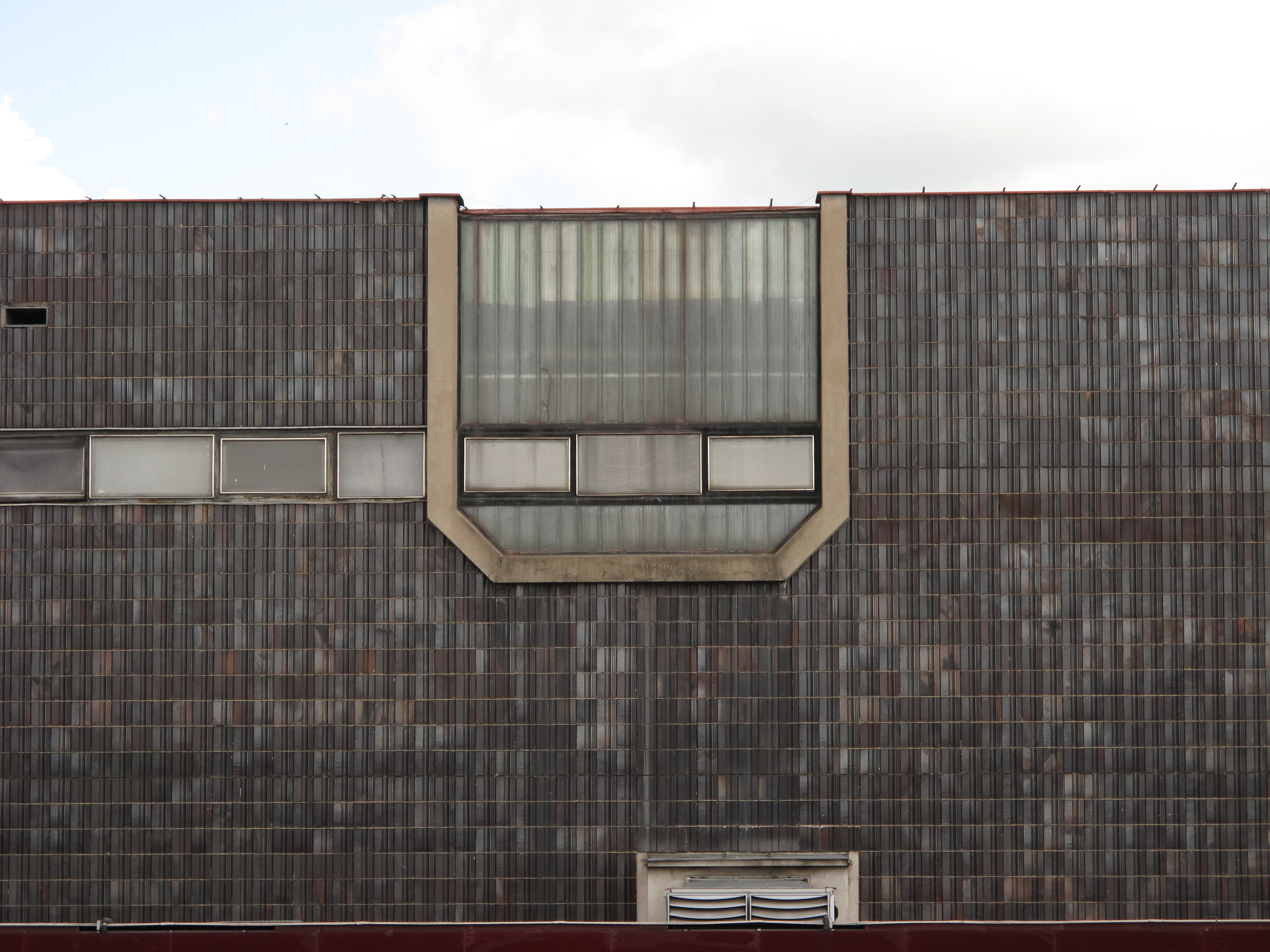
Ceramic cladding of the facade with a set of windows

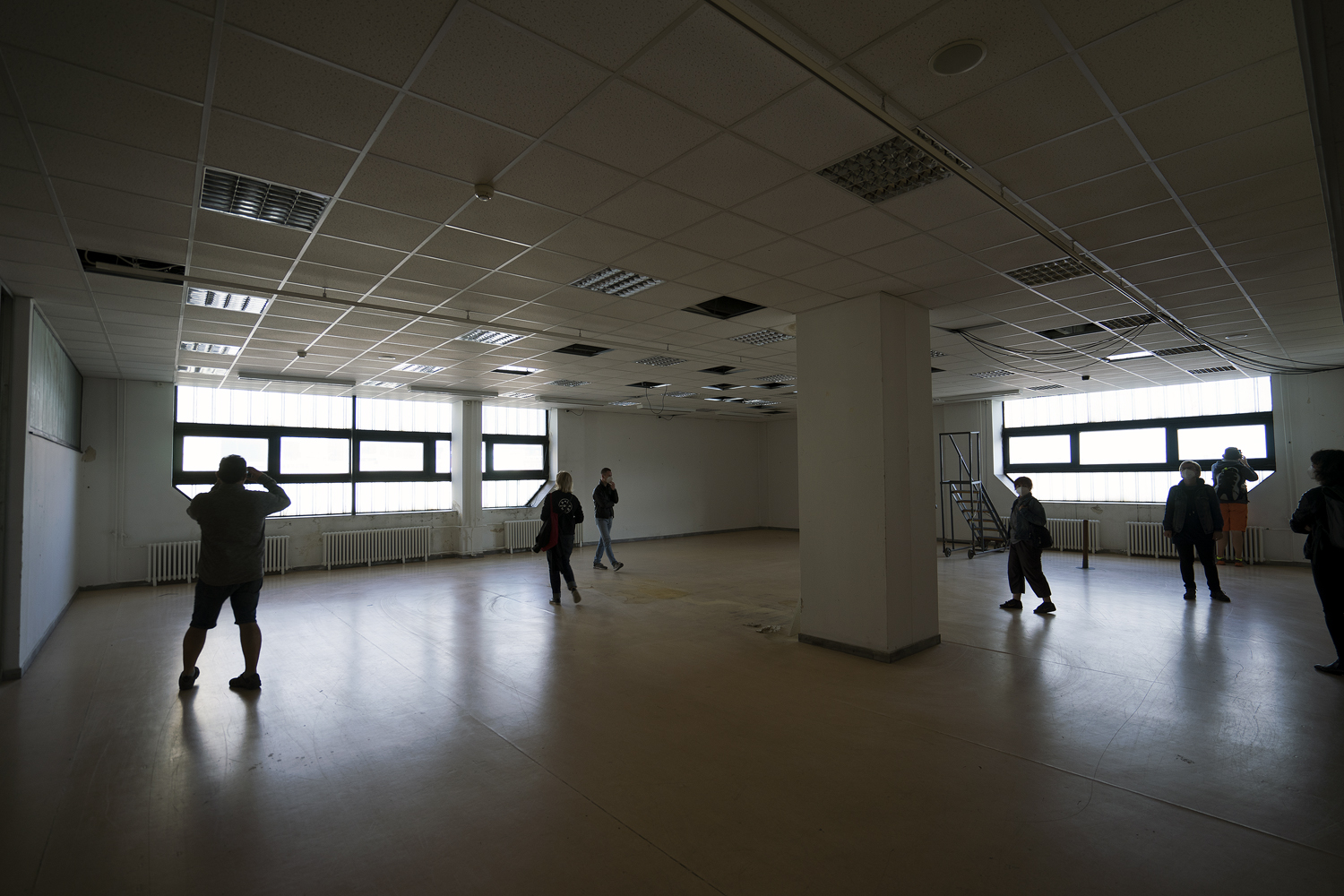
Interior with pocket windows

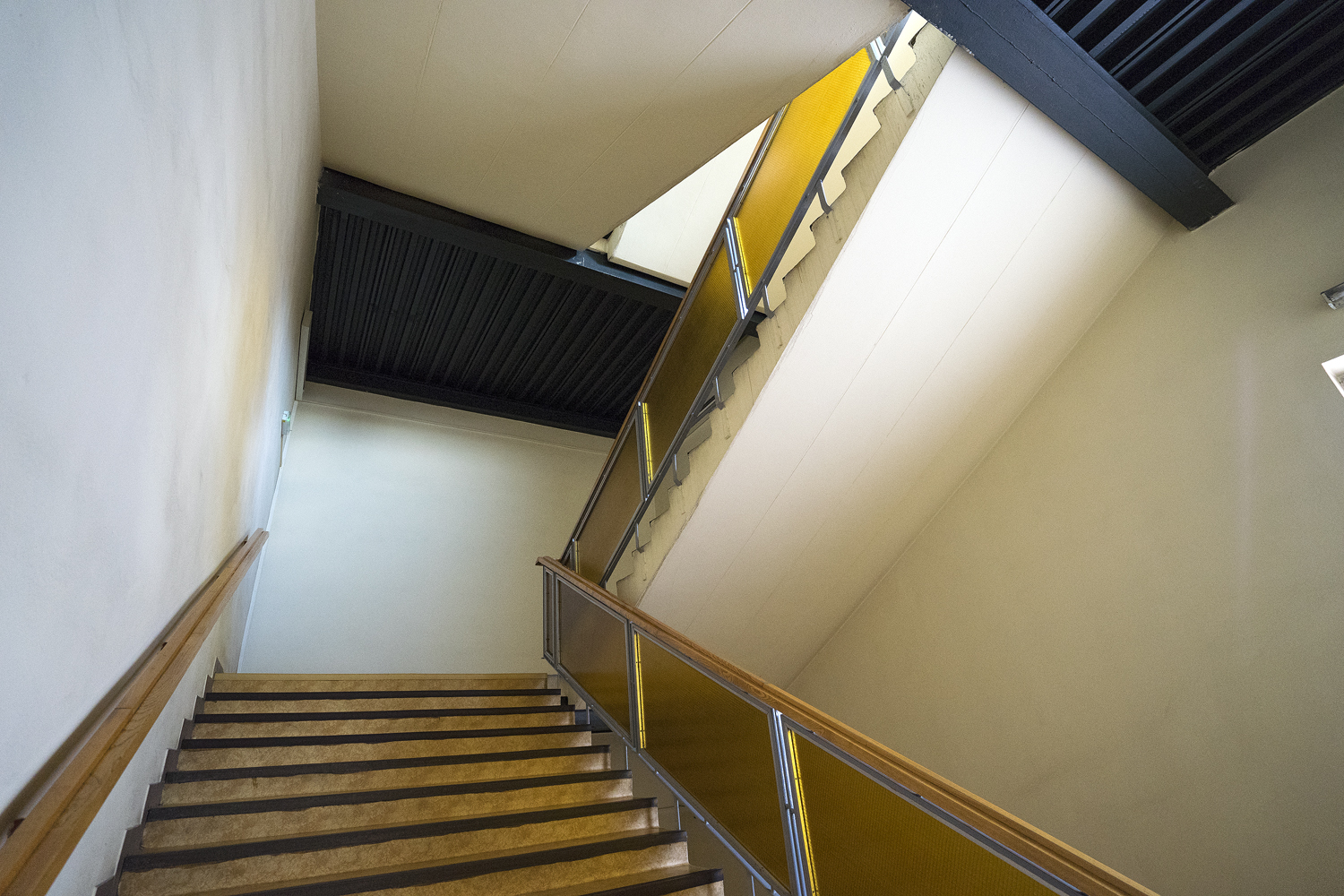
Side staircase inside a department store
