= Zdeněk Řihák =

Czech architect (1924–2006)

- Born: 10 August 1924; Napajedla, Czechoslovakia
- Died: 15 August 2006 (aged 82); Brno, Czech Republic
- Education: Brno University of Technology
- Occupation: Architect

Zdeněk Řihák (10 August 1924 – 15 August 2006) was a Czech architect. His works were primarily hotels in Czechoslovakia and are generally associated with Czechoslovak modernism in particular and Eastern Bloc modernism in general.

== Life and career ==
Zdeněk Řihák was born on 10 August 1924 in Napajedla, Czechoslovakia (today the Czech Republic), to Antonín and Marie Řihák. He studied in nearby Zlín in the art school of the sculptor Vincenc Makovský, and later at the Brno University of Technology. His first notable employment was with Potravinoprojekt in Brno.

One of Řihák's first architectural works, in 1955, was a school in Křenov, where the artist Bohumír Matal was invited to create a canvas for the entrance area. During this time, Řihák was employed with Potravinoprojekt and worked on a variety of projects in Czechoslovakia and around the world. Řihák's first large scale and notable project was the Hotel Continental in Brno, a fifteen story upscale hotel of quality compared to contemporary American hotels.During this time, Řihák also worked with Jan Tymich on the design of the Hotel Horizont in Pec pod Sněžkou, however it would not be completed until the late 1970s.

Later, Potravinoprojekt was reformed into the State Project Institute of Trade in Brno (SPITB), where Řihák continued to work. Following the Hotel Continental, Řihák worked primarily on hotels, with a focus on mountain hotels. During this time, he designed the Hotel Panorama and Hotel Patria in the High Tatras, the former of which has been called his most interesting work, and is considered a source of inspiration for modernist mountain hotels in Czechoslovakia. Later, Řihák also designed the Labská Bouda hotel in the Giant Mountains.

The SPITB office closed in 1990 and Řihák transitioned to work on residential construction in the private sector, starting his own practice in 1991. He died on 15 August 2006 in Brno, and is buried at the Brno Central Cemetery.

Lukáš Kos, writing in the journal Architektúra & urbanizmus in 2021 has argued that Řihák's adoption of an individual style and western influences has made his work hard to understand by domestic contemporaries and in addition to the poor preservation of archives has ultimately resulted in a greater degree of obscurity for his work.

== Selected work ==
=== Hotel Continental (1961–1964) ===
The Hotel Continental is a hotel in Brno, which was planned by Řihák, together with Vladimír Kovařík and Alois Semela, and completed in 1964. The building is prominent in Brno's skyline and is located at the site of the birthplace of well-known modernist architect Adolf Loos.

The Hotel Continental was originally planned to be a hostel to serve visitors to Brno's trade fairs, however in the late 1950s planning was shifted towards a more upscale "B*-class" hotel given the lack of accommodation in the city at the time. The hotel is notable for containing a Y-shaped floorplan, which was unusual, however not unprecedented given the construction of the Beverly Hilton by Welton Becket in California in 1955. The hotel was styled in the "Brussels style", and has fifteen floors. Notable architectural features included a mezzanine spiral staircase, unique mezzanine ceiling pattern, and the use of rubble masonry, venetian tile, glass, marble and pear wood.

The hotel's design also involved cooperation with the art group Trasa, the notable of their works is the sculpture Birds (Czech: Ptáci) by Olbram Zoubek, at the façade of the hotel.

As of 2024, the building continues to be used as a hotel under its original name, though it has seen modifications and renovations, notable of which is the addition of an underground parking garage.

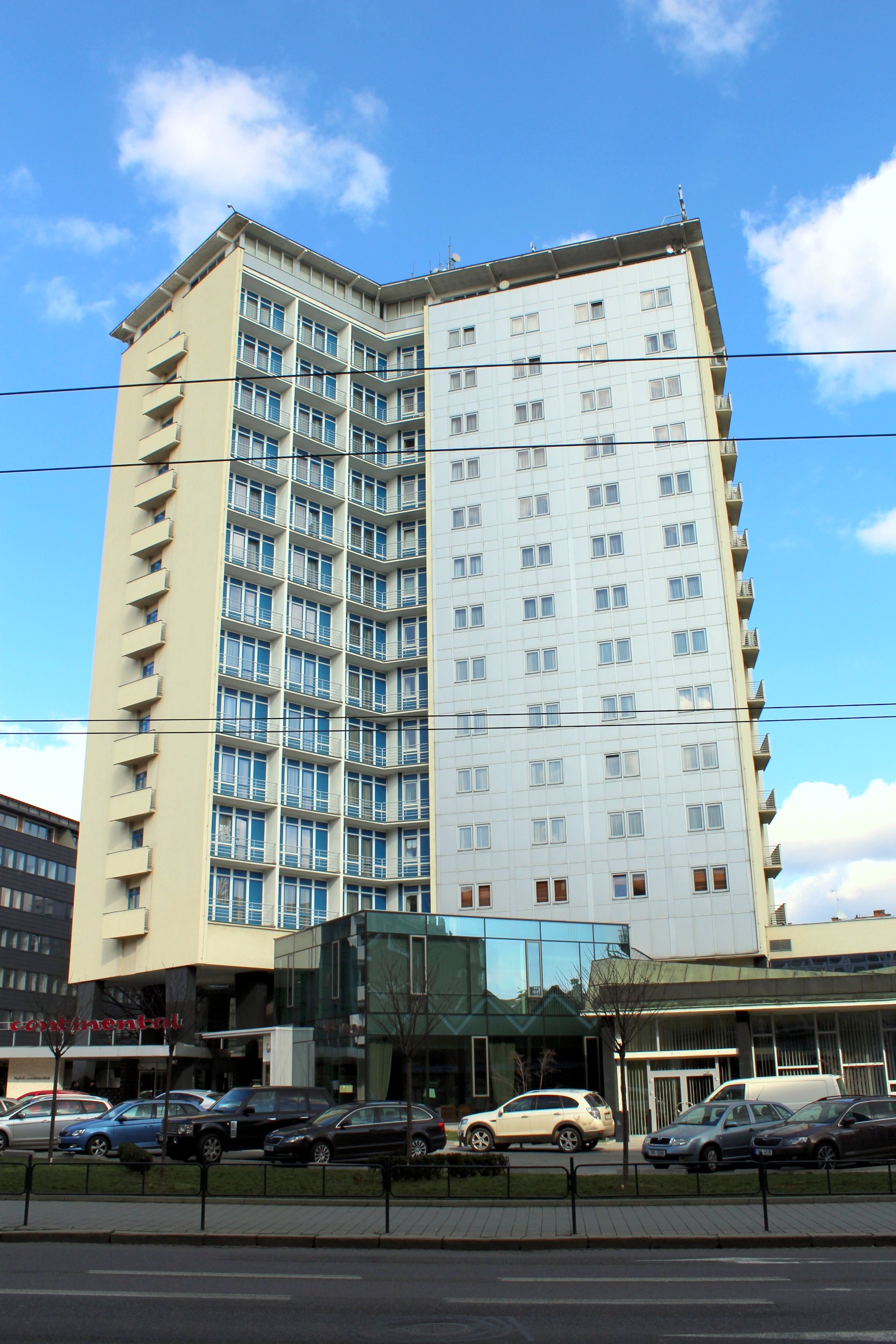
Front view.

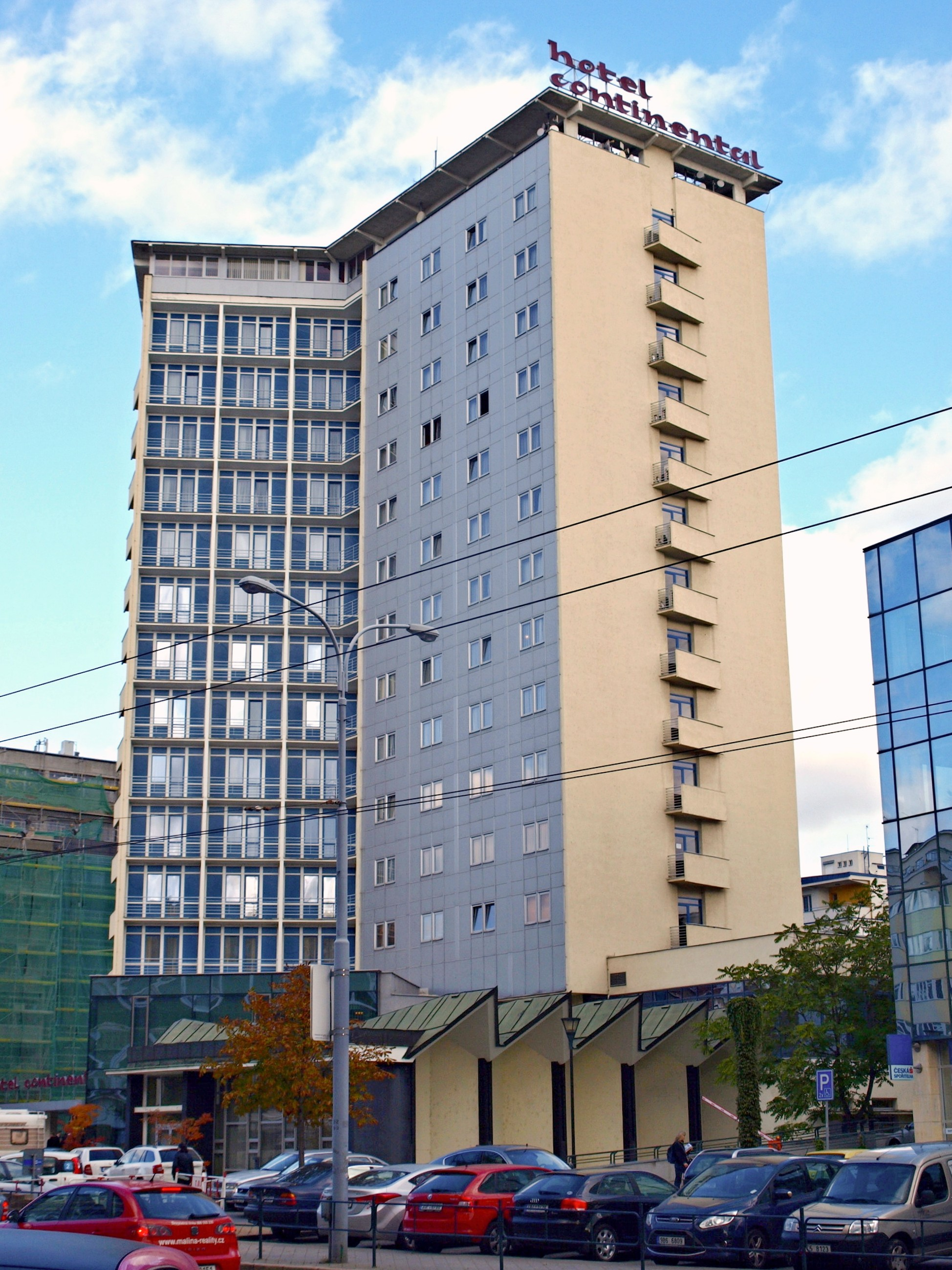
Tilted view.

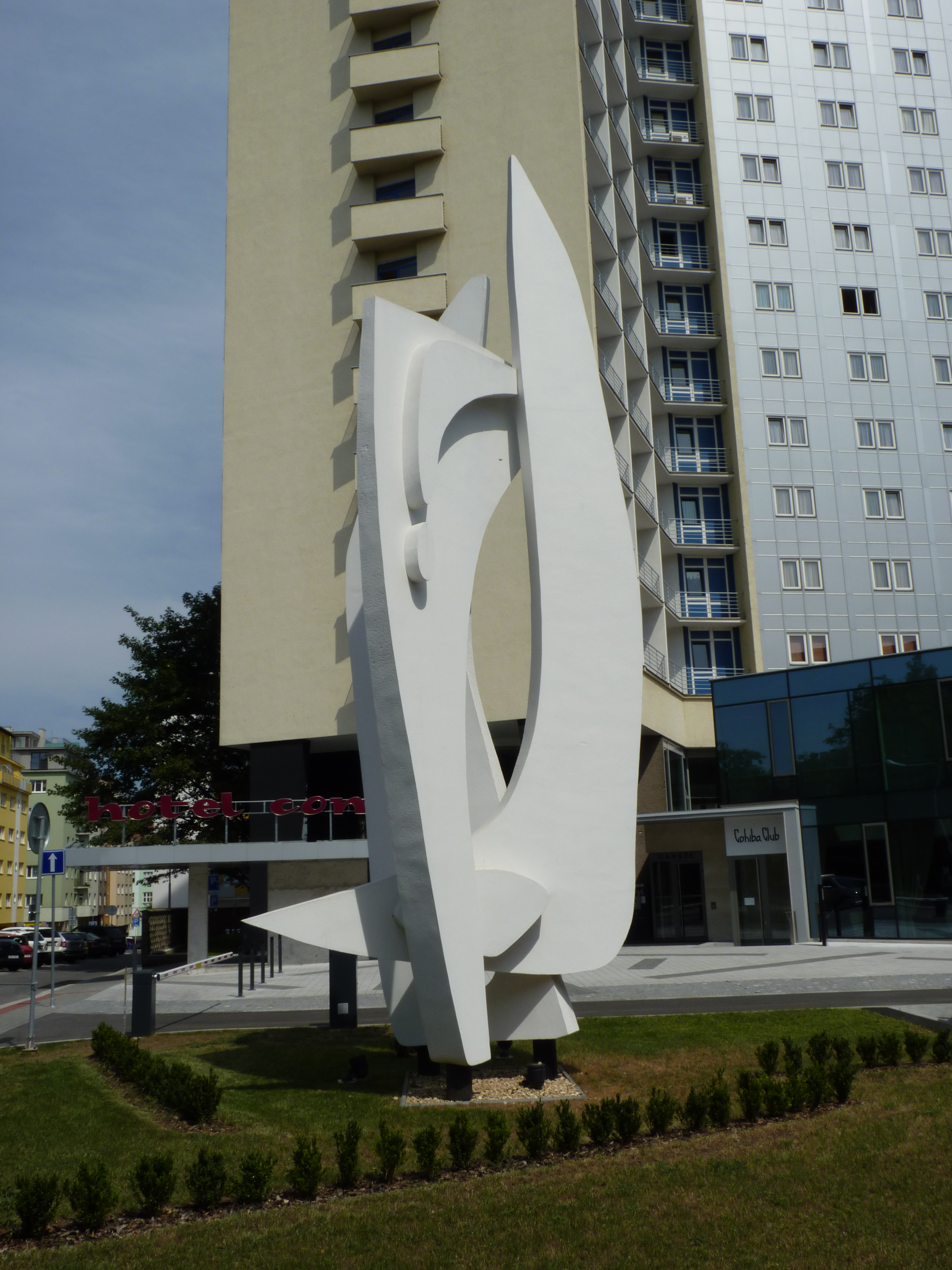
Birds by Olbram Zoubek.

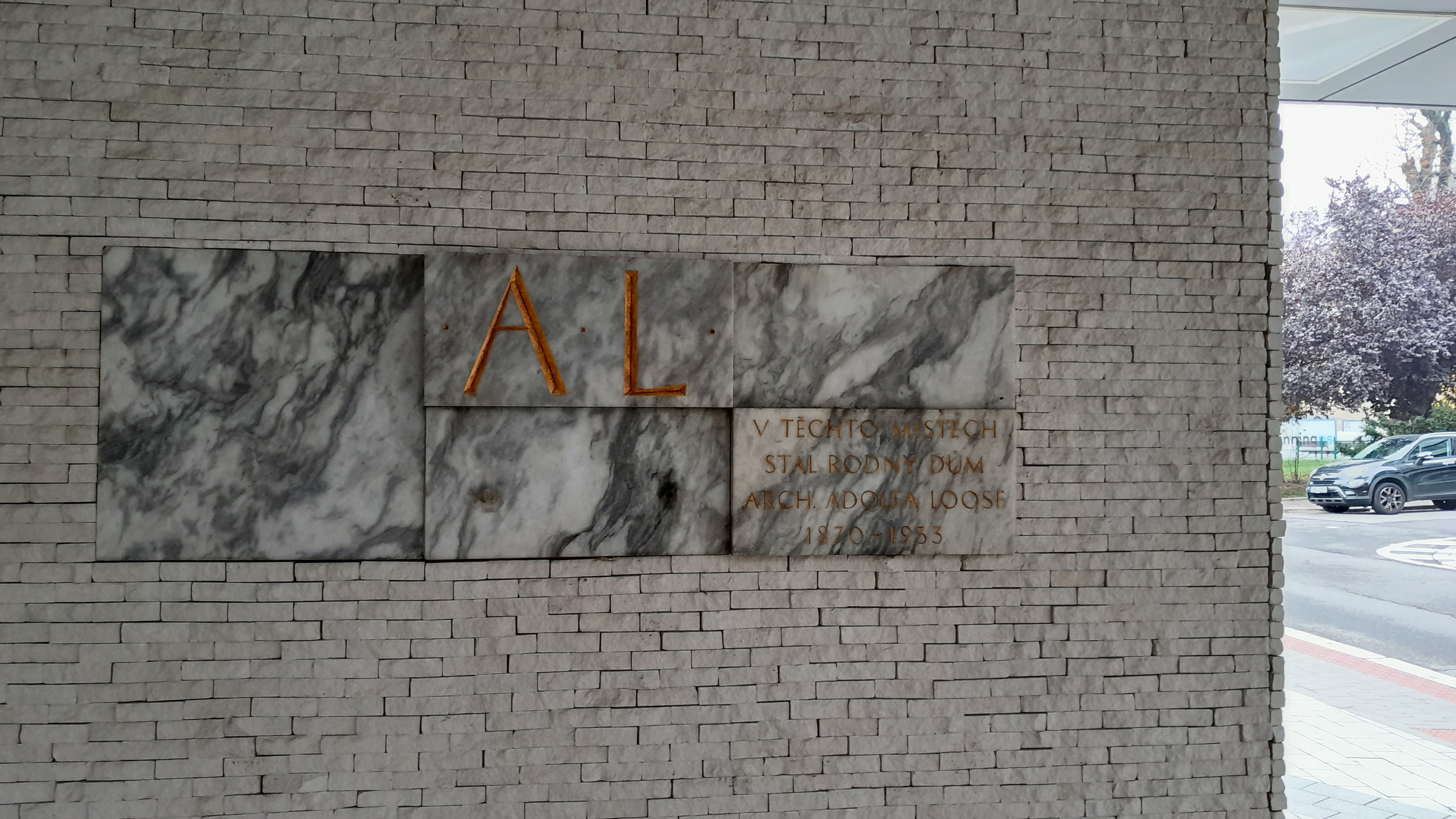
Plaque in honour of Adolf Loos' birthplace.

=== Hotel Panorama (1967–1970) ===
The Hotel Panorama is a mountain hotel in Štrbské Pleso, a resort town in the High Tatras in modern-day Slovakia. It is located adjacent to the town's railway station. The hotel was constructed as a "B*-class" hotel for the 1970 for the FIS Nordic Ski Championships.

The hotel displays Řihák's background is sculpture, with a massing composed of stacked rectangular prisms supported by unevenly spaced steel supports located on top of the hotel's core amenities. After its construction, the hotel sparked controversy due to its placement as a high-rise in a conservation area, which has not seen significant tourism development prior to it. In 1970, the hotel made the pages of the international architecture magazine L'Architecture d'Aujourd'hui.

The hotel's original brutalist exterior and interior finish has not been retained due to modernisation, however its unique shape has.

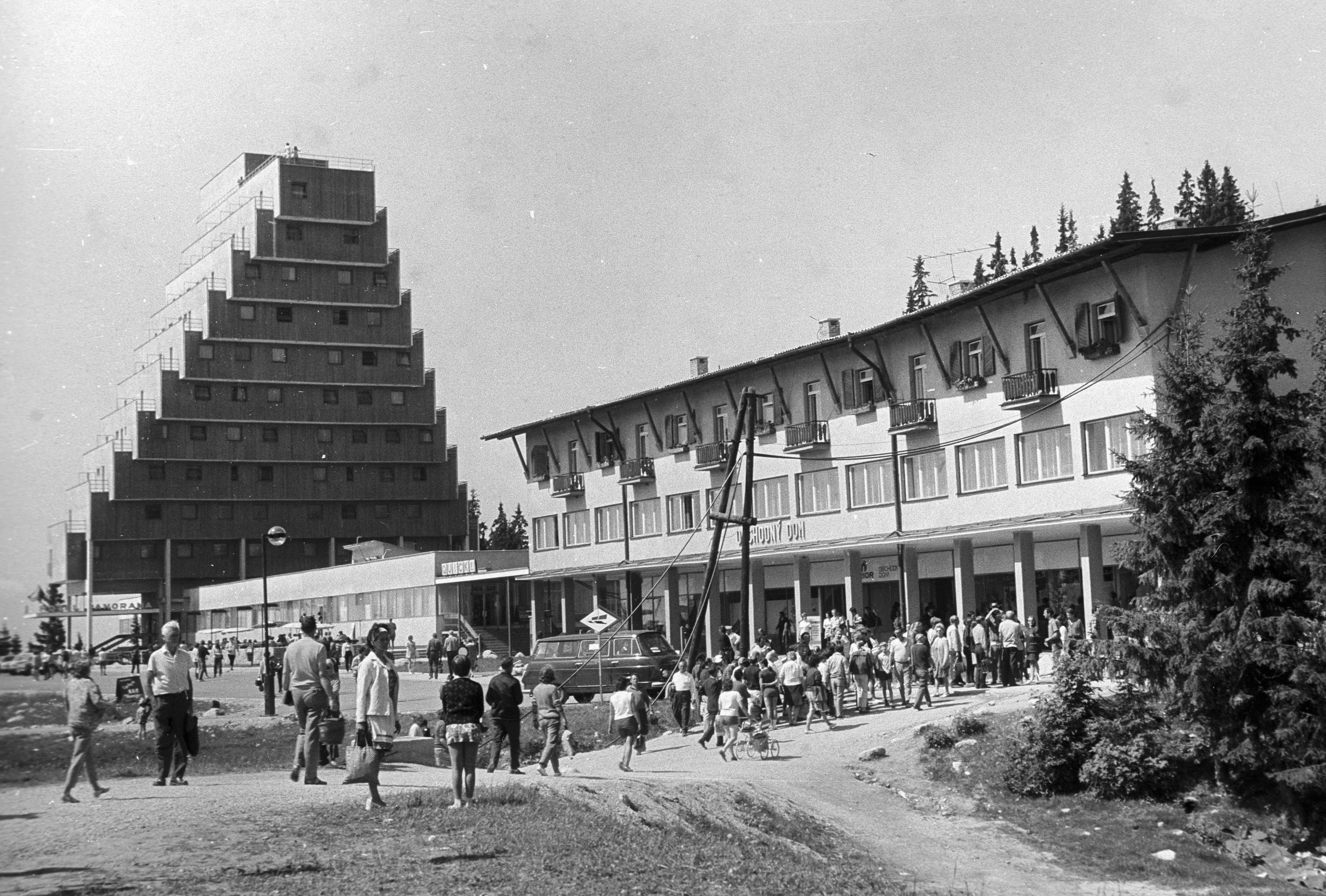
View in 1971.

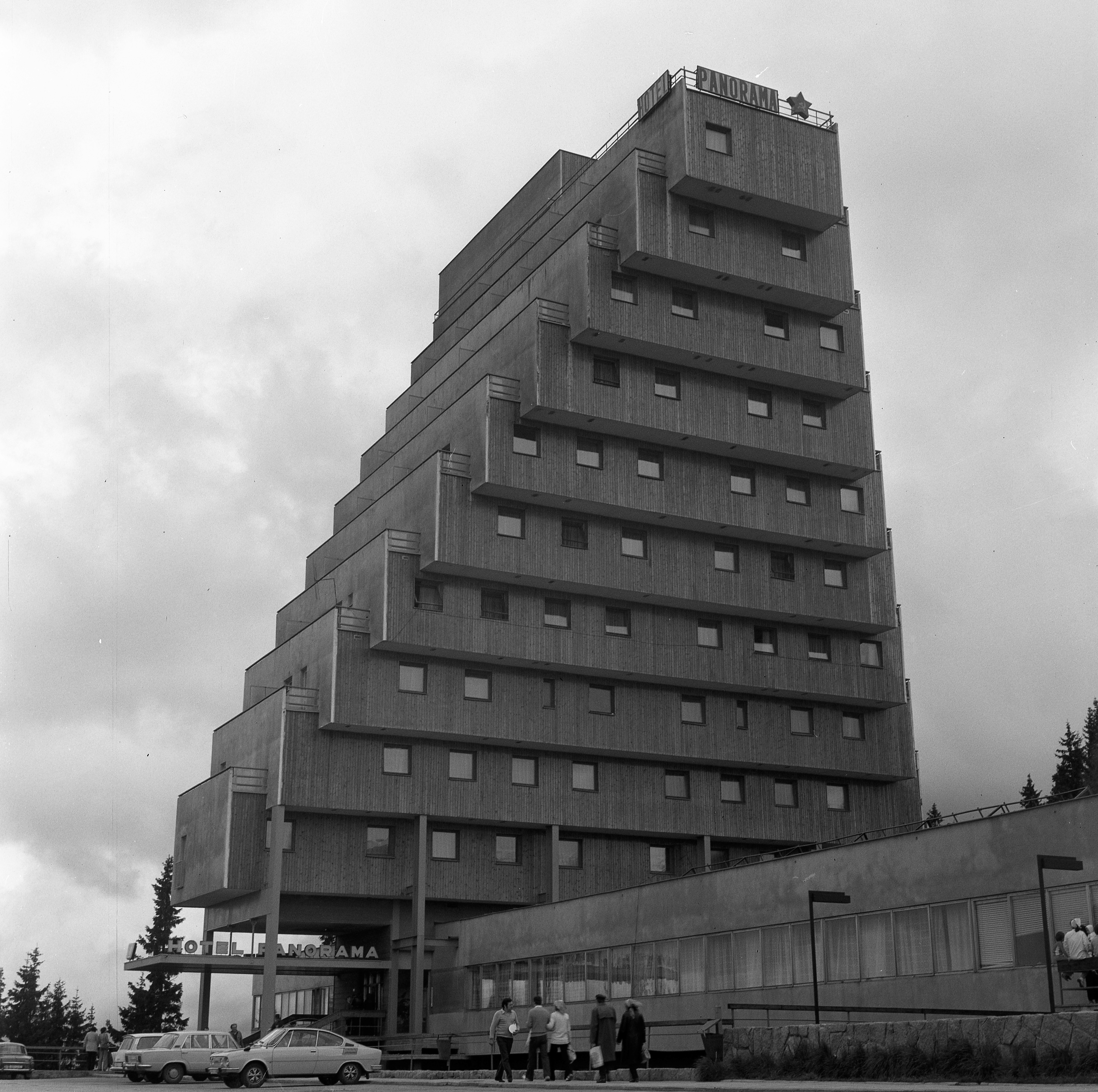
View in 1975.

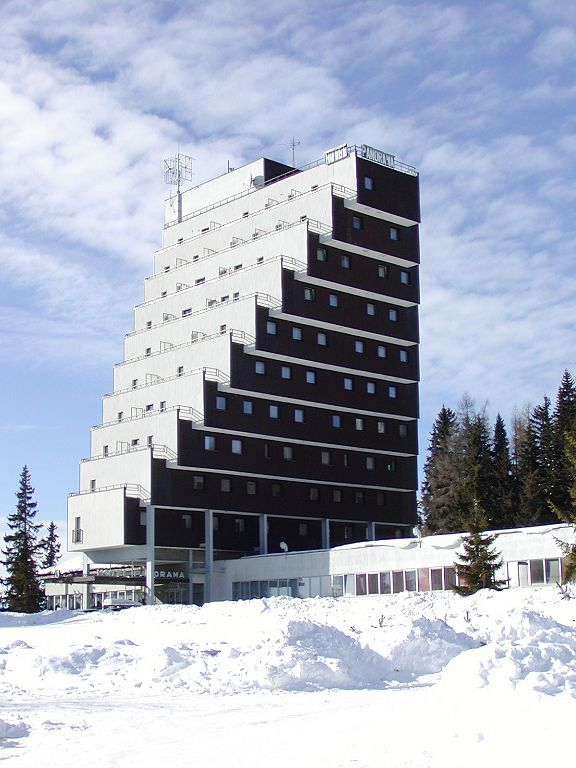
View in 2003.

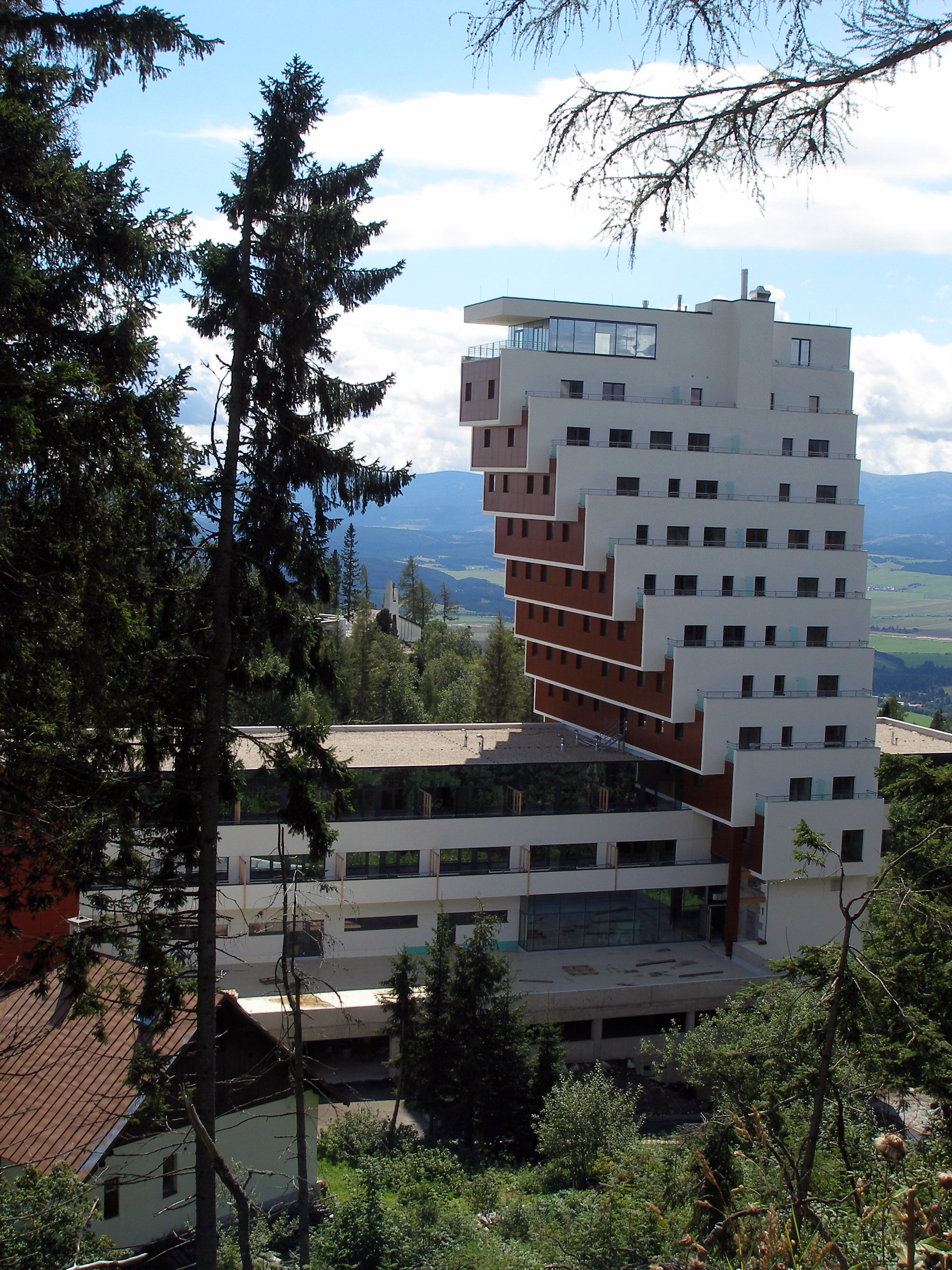
"Opposite direction" view in 2010.

=== Hotel Patria (1968–1973) ===
The Hotel Patria is a mountain hotel in Štrbské Pleso, opposite the town's namesake lake. The planning and construction of the hotel was impacted by the political normalisation in Czechoslovakia, which resulted in a climate less favourable to international tourism. Řihák worked with Alois Semela and Bohuslav Rychlink on this project, which was designated as an "A*-class" hotel. Řihák's design aimed to incorporate traditional Slovak elements, and to be mindful of the surrounding mountain scenery The hotel's triangular prism massing reflects the surrounding mountain peaks. The hotel's construction saw complications and delays from works proximity to the lake and the mountain environment.

The hotel is notable for its large size, and with its completion in 1973 and inauguration in 1976, it being Řihák's last major work.

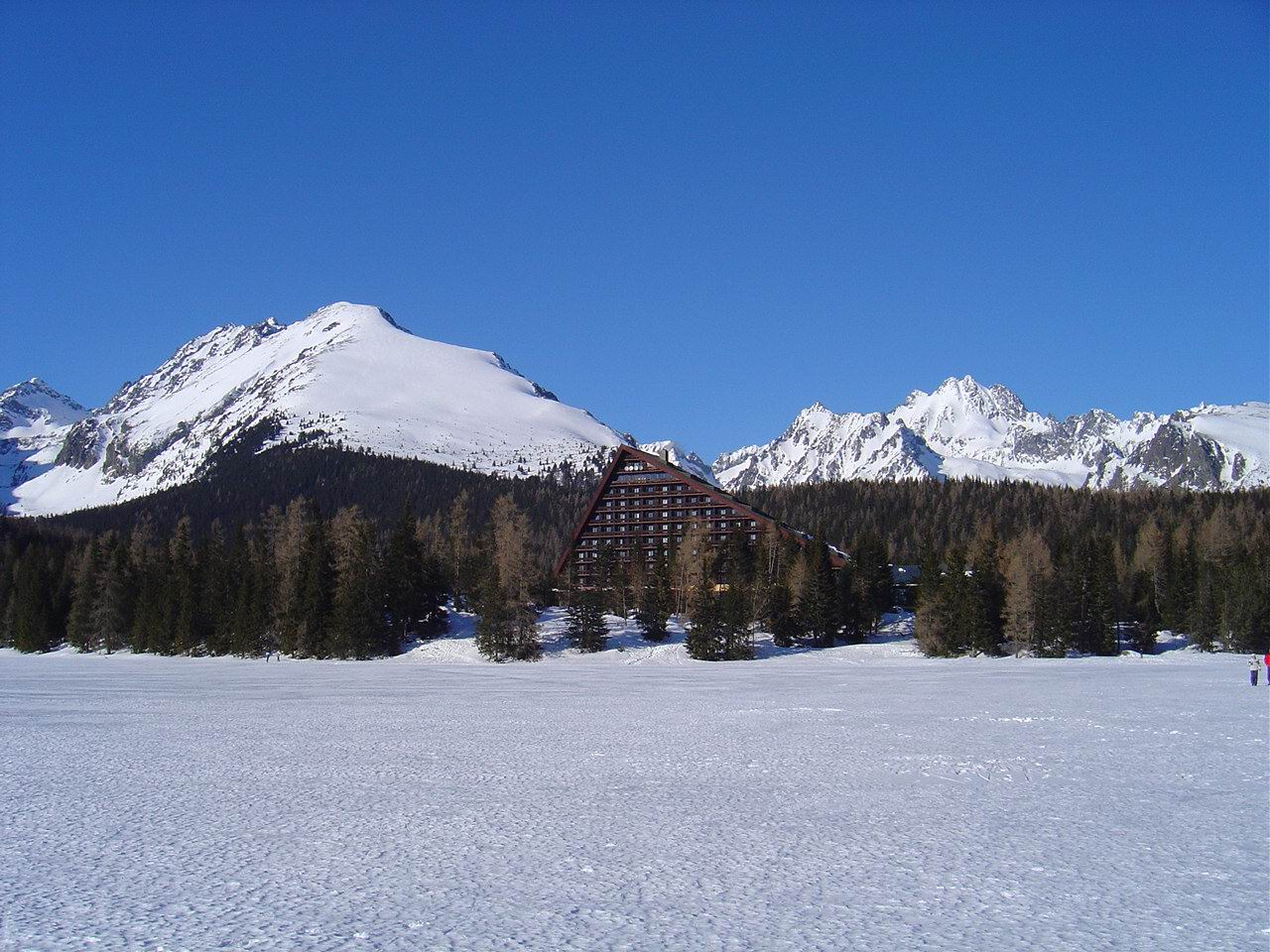
Northward view in 2005.

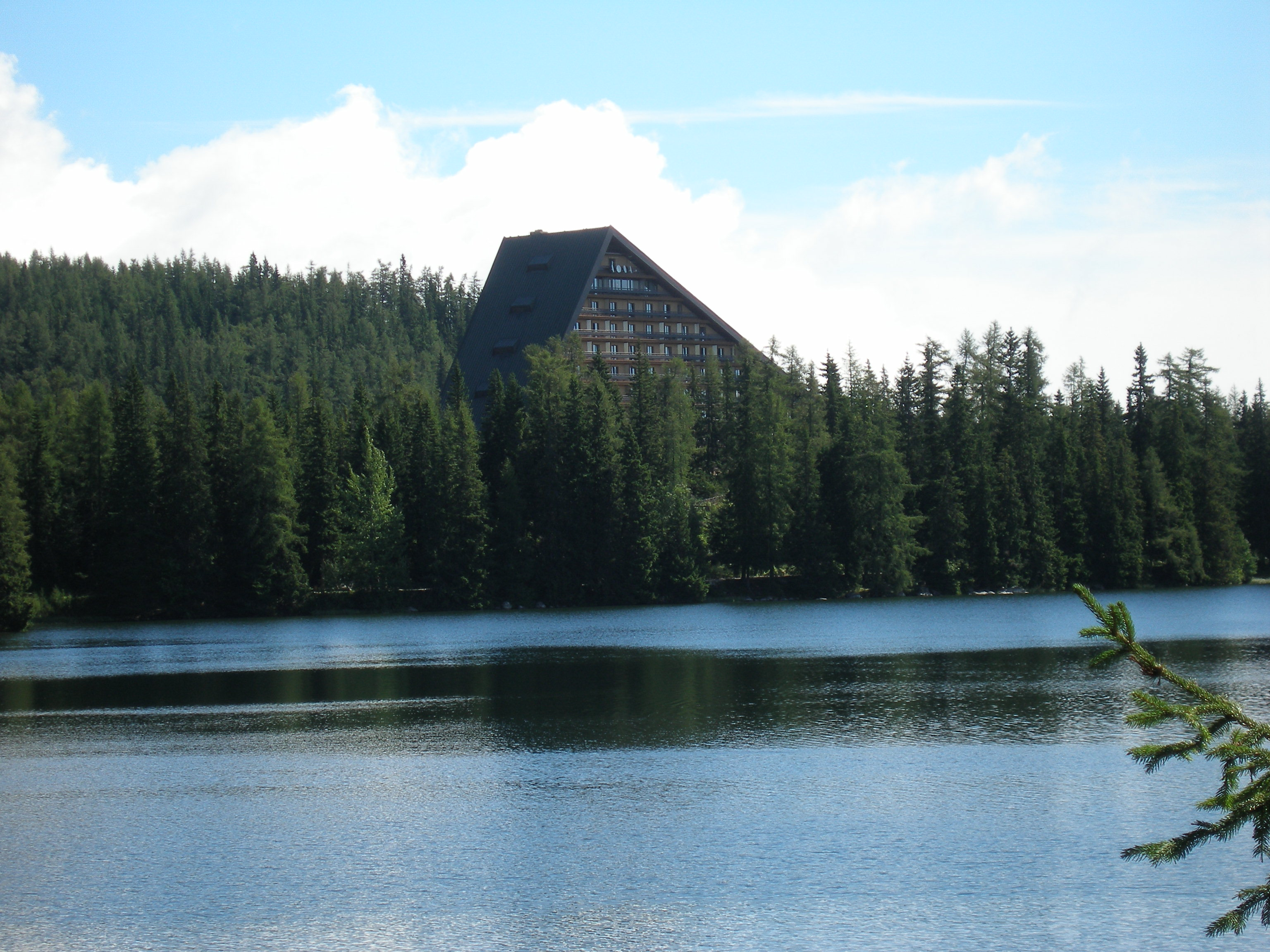
Eastward view in 2010.

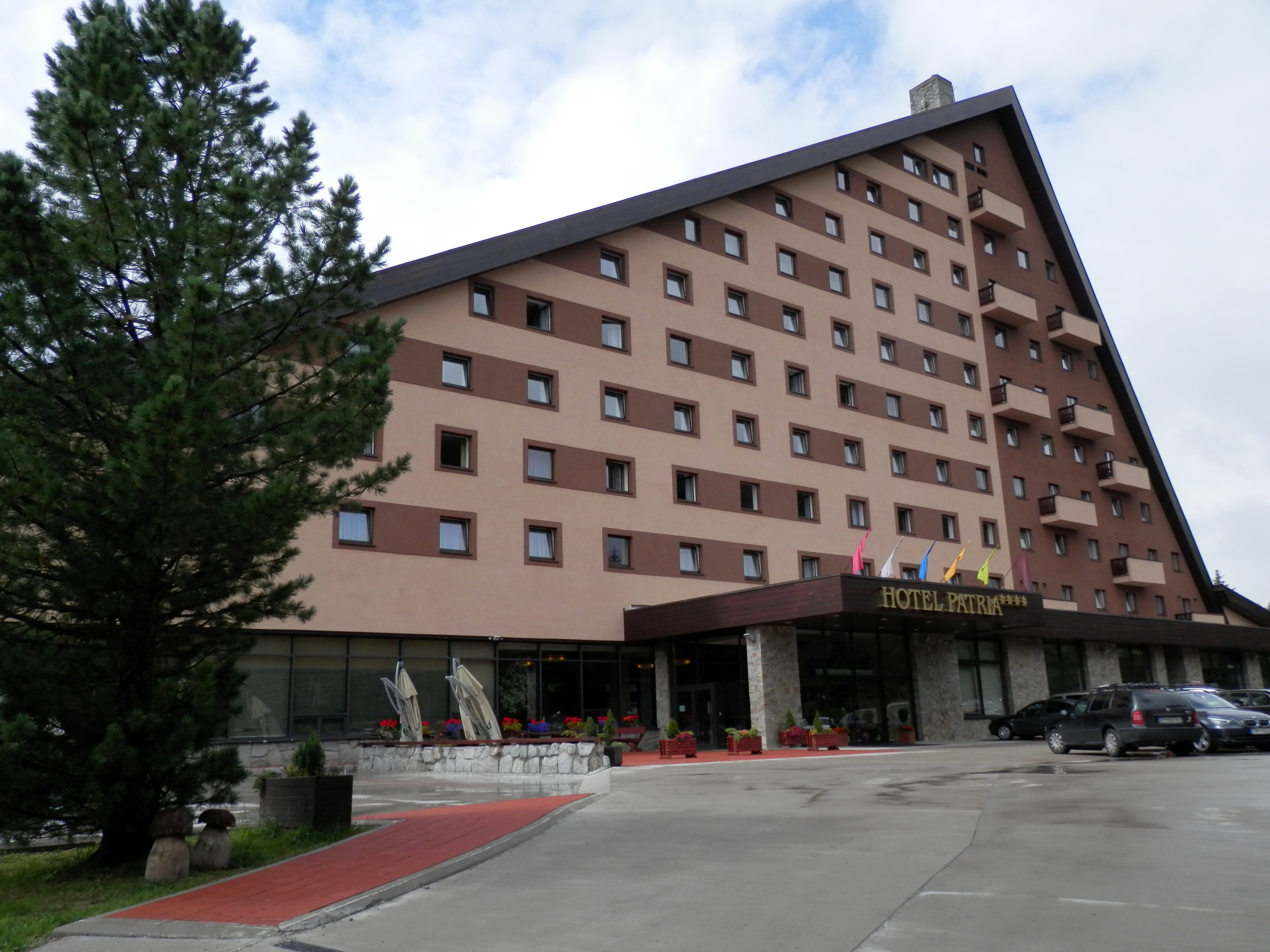
Westward view in 2012.

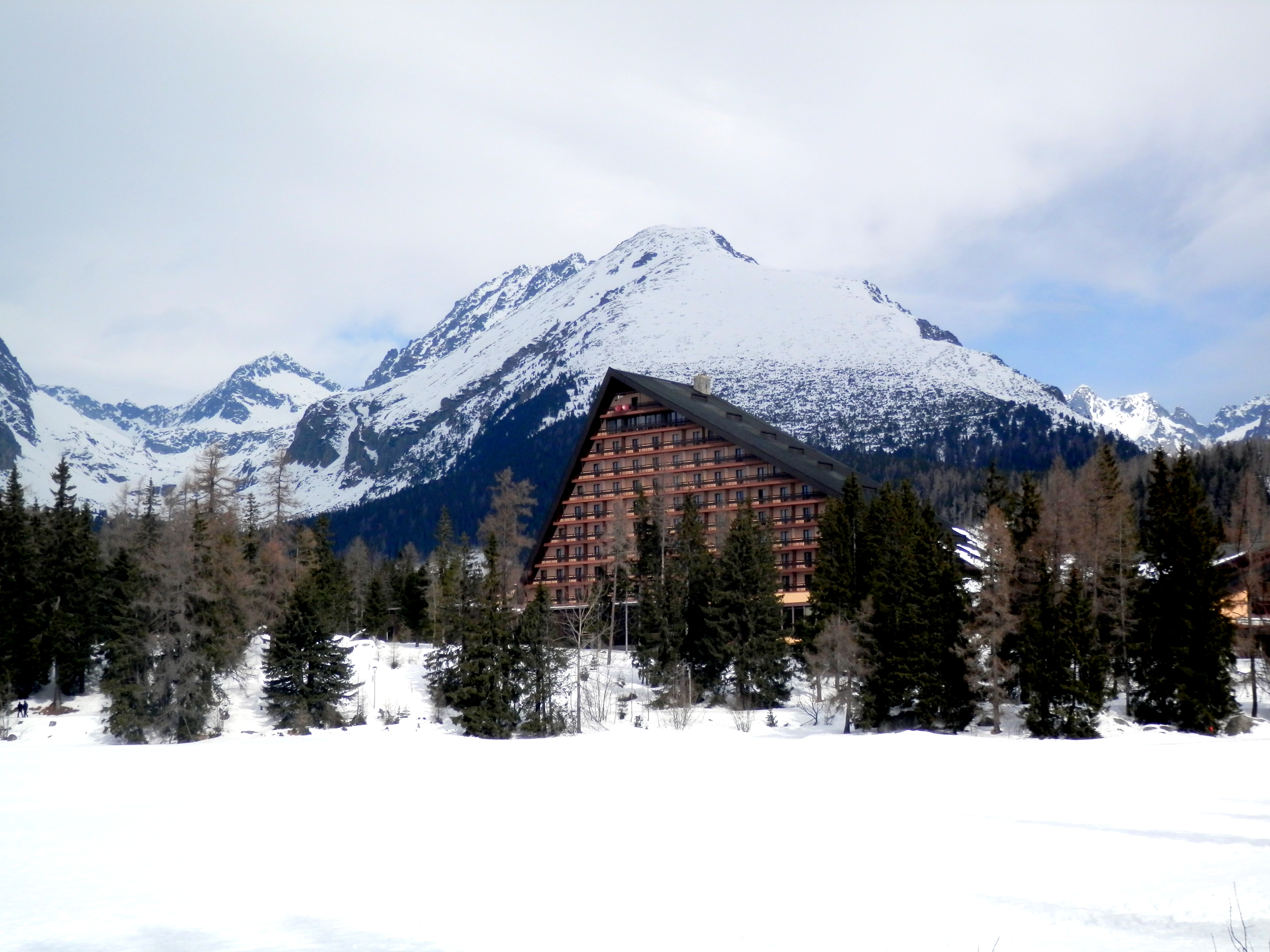
Northward view in 2013.

=== Labská Bouda (1969–1972) ===
The Labská Bouda is a mountain hotel near the resort town of Špindlerův Mlýn in the Krknoše Mountains in the modern-day Czech Republic. The hotel was constructed on the site of a previous building which burnt down in 1965. Per its original construction it is classified as a "B*-class" hotel, and is not reachable by car. Its styling draws inspiration from both traditional sources and Řihák's earlier work of the Hotel Patria. The hotel utilises its mountainside site to create a single massing with vertical emphasis, and an upside-down layout, with the reception being on the seventh floor. The hotel's utilisation of the site is such that from its main entrance at the top, it appears low-rise, while its full length and height can be seen from the valley.

The hotel's top floor housed a restaurant with panoramic glass windows, however due to weather conditions the windows were soon replaced by smaller ones. Materially, the floors used large basalt tiles and travertine windowsills.

The Labská Bouda often receives negative criticism for its remote location and alleged incompatibility with its surroundings.

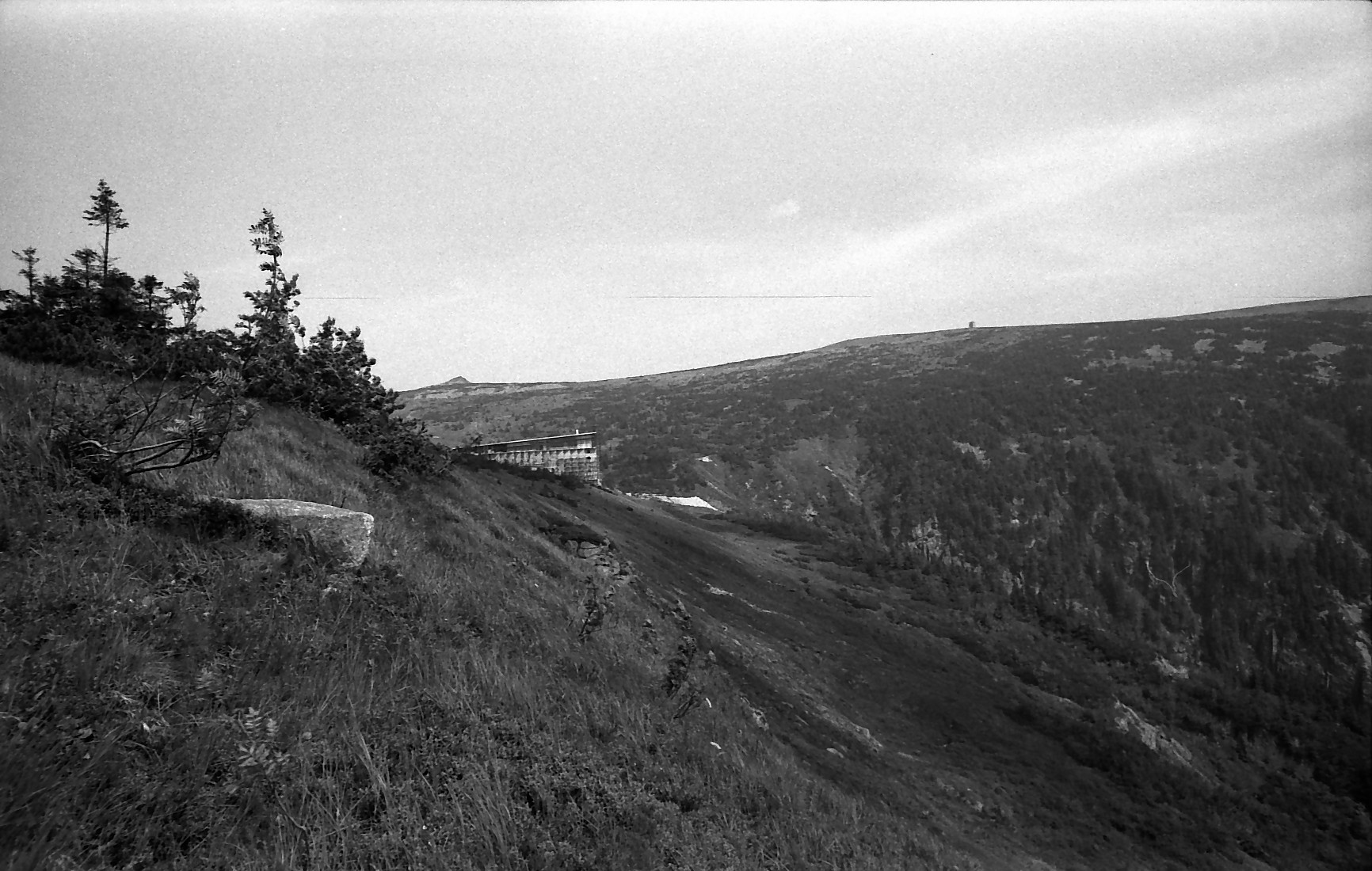
Northward view in 1972.

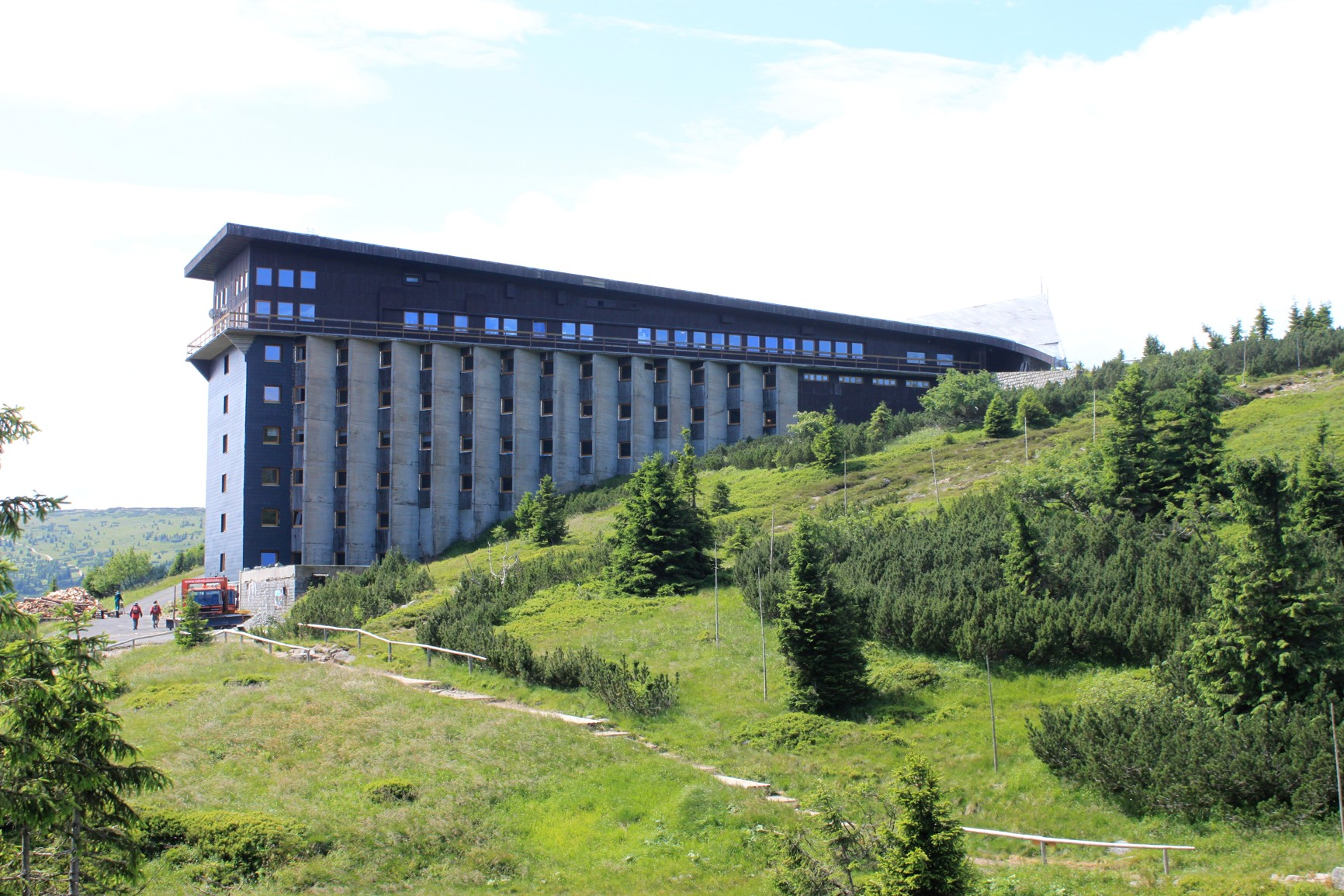
Southward view in 2014.

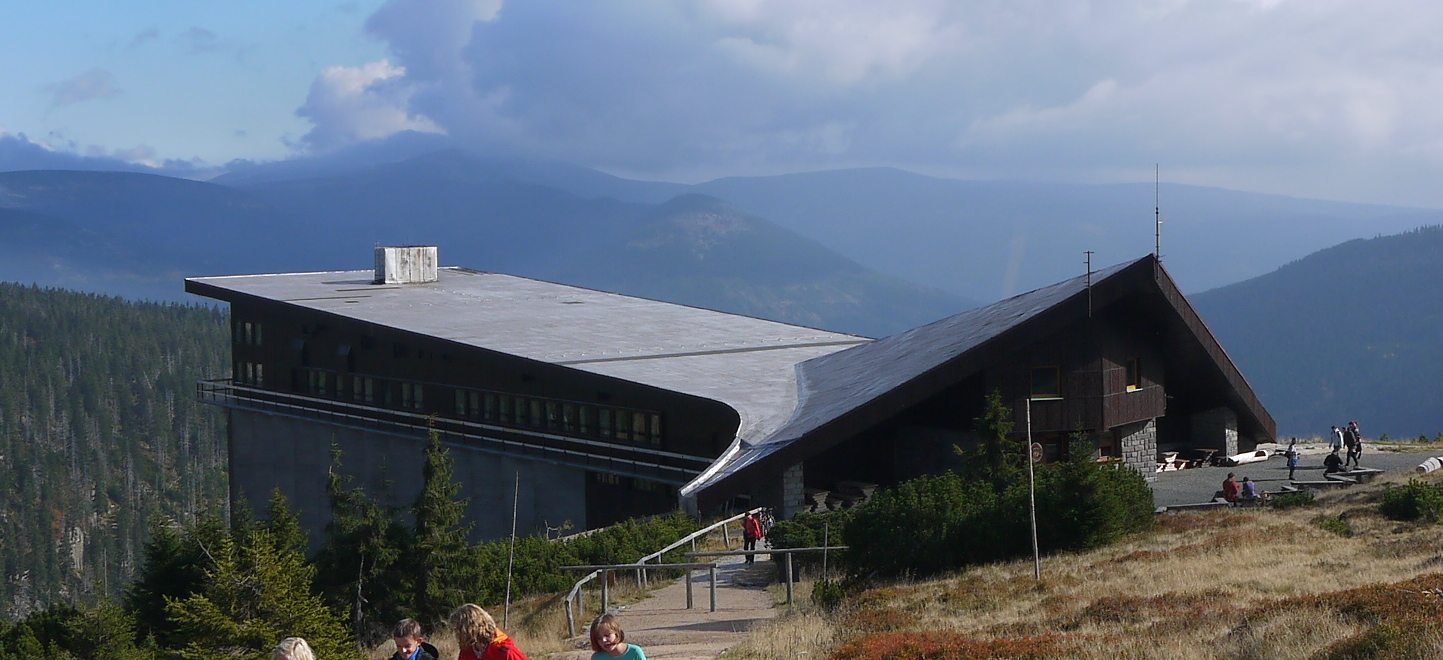
View to the southeast in 2014.

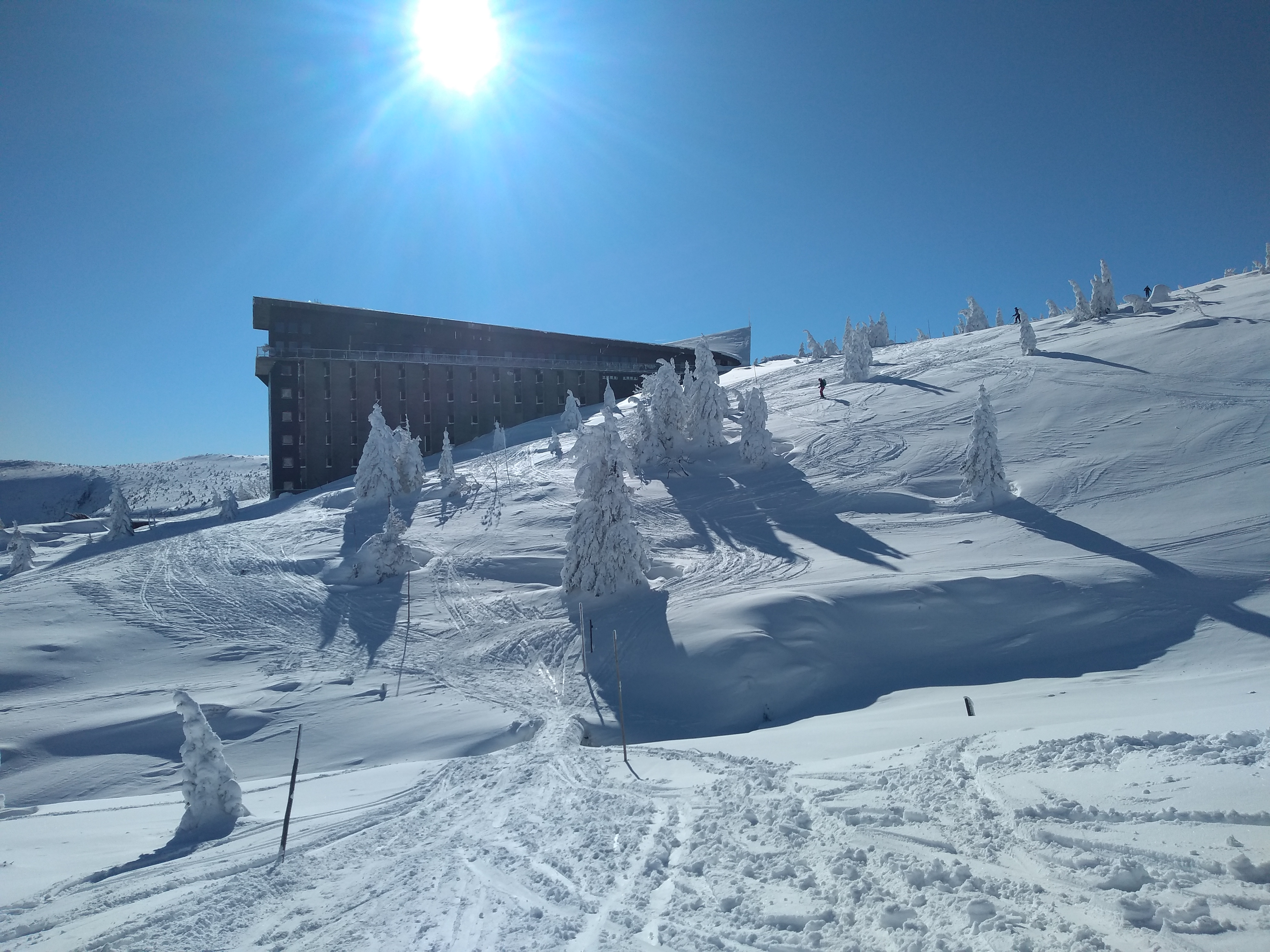
Southward view in 2021.

== List of works ==
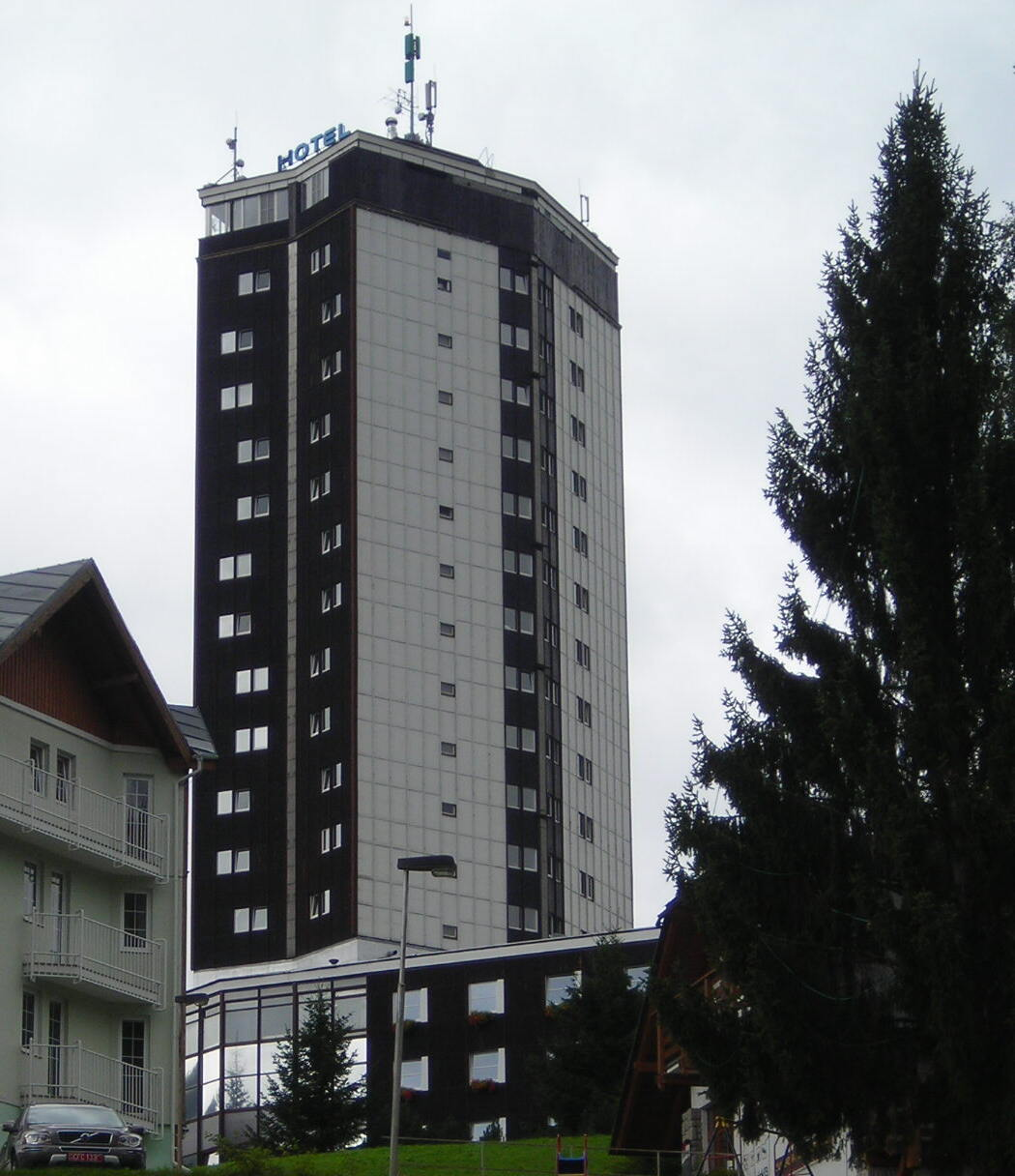
Hotel Horizont in Pec pod Sněžkou (1964–1979).

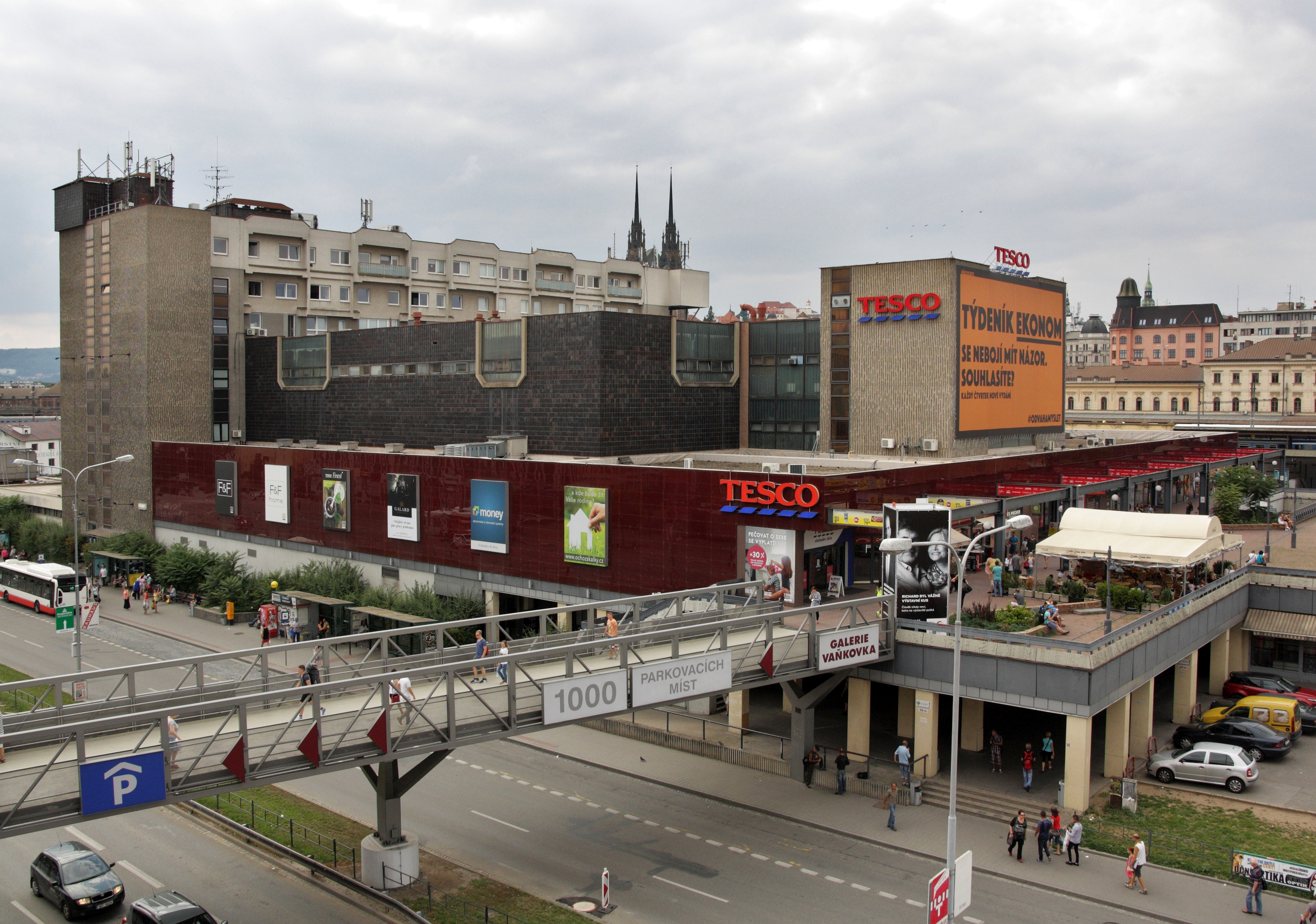
Prior department store in Brno (1974–1984).

- 1955 school in Křenov.
- 1955 department store in Nitra.
- 1956 milk bar in Brno.
- 1957 housing estate near Olomouc.
- 1958 saltworks in Alexandria.
- 1958 malt house in Rio Claro, Brazil.
- 1961–1964 Hotel Continental in Brno.
- 1964–1979 Hotel Horizont in Pec pod Sněžkou.
- 1967–1970 Hotel Panorama in Štrbské Pleso.
- 1968–1970 Research Institute for Mathematical Machines in Brno.
- 1968–1973 Hotel Patria in Štrbské Pleso.
- 1969–1972 Labská Bouda in Špindlerův Mlýn.
- 1974–1984 Prior department store in Brno.

== In popular culture ==
- The album cover for the 2018 album of Belarusian post-punk band Molchat Doma, Etazhi, displays Řihák's Hotel Panorama.
