= Carpathian Mountains =

Mountain range in Central and Eastern Europe

Carpathians
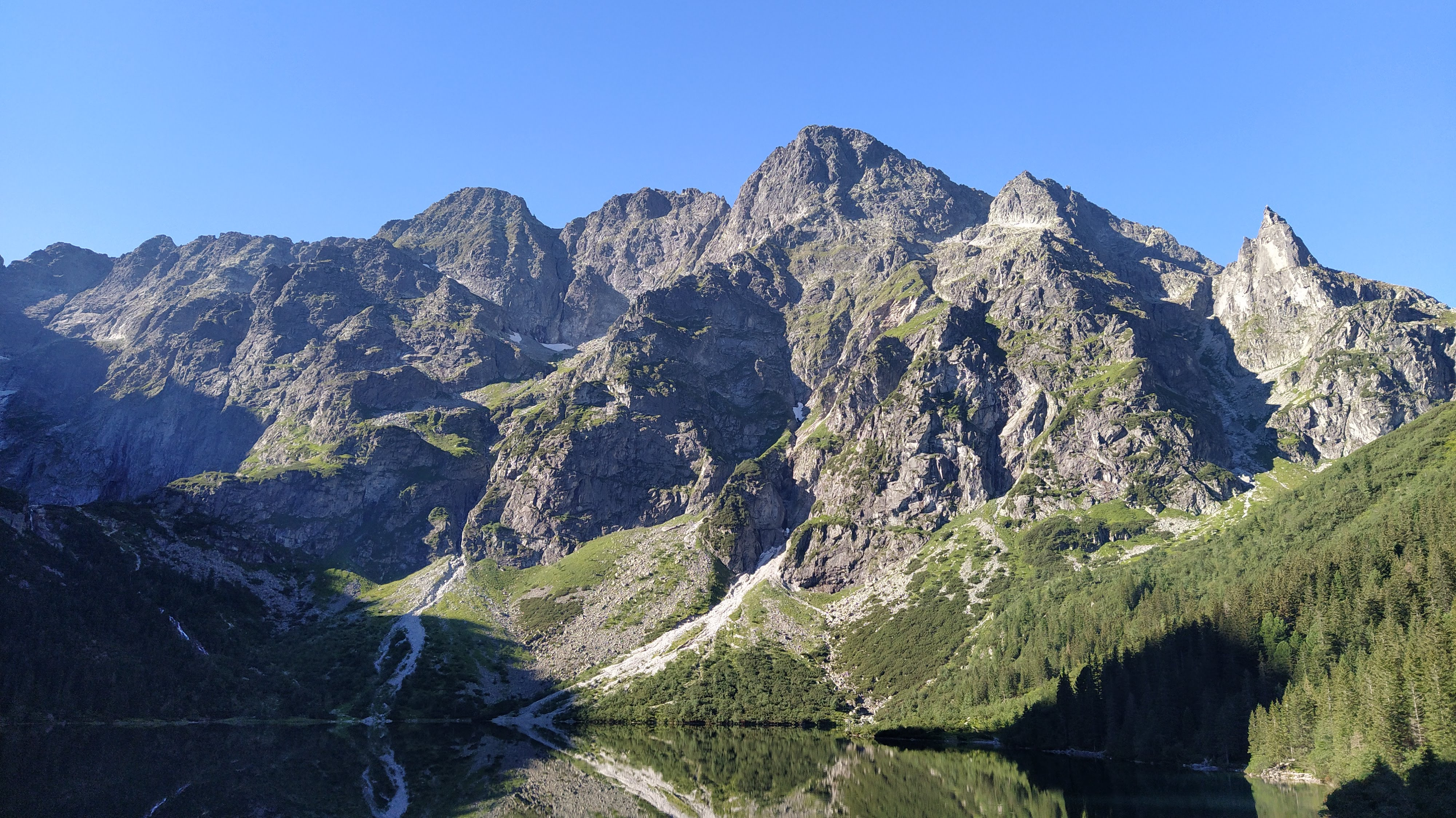
- Tatra Mountains – Morskie Oko, Mięguszowiecki Summits, Cubryna, Mnich

Highest point
- Peak: Gerlachovský štít, Slovakia
- Elevation: 2,656 m (8,714 ft)

Dimensions
- Length: 1,500 km (930 mi)
- Width: 500 km (310 mi)
- Area: 190,000 km^{2} (73,000 mi^{2})

Naming
- Native name: Karpaty (Czech); Karpaten (German); Kárpátok (Hungarian); Karpaty (Polish); Carpați (Romanian); Карпати / Karpati (Serbian); Karpaty (Slovak); Карпати, Karpaty (Ukrainian); Карпаты, Karpaty (Rusyn)

Geography
- Location within Europe

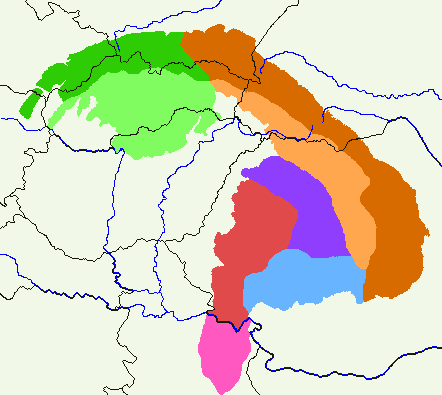
- The different sections of the Carpathians with the borders of constituent countries in black, and the rivers in blue
- Countries: Czech Republic; Poland; Hungary; Austria; Slovakia; Ukraine; Romania; Serbia
- Range coordinates: 47°00′N 25°30′E
- Borders on: Alps

Geology
- Orogeny: Alpine orogeny

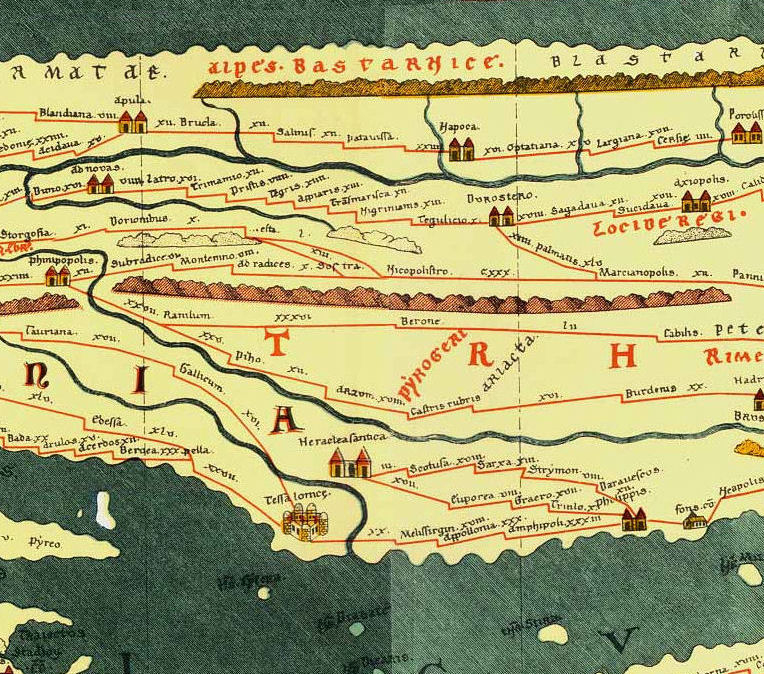
The Eastern Carpathians as 'Alpes Bastarnice' on Tabula Peutingeriana

The Carpathian Mountains or Carpathians (/kɑːrˈpeɪθiənz/) are a range of mountains forming an arc across Central and Southeast Europe. Roughly 1,500 km (930 mi) long, it is the third-longest European mountain range after the Urals at 2,500 km (1,600 mi) and the Scandinavian Mountains at 1,700 km (1,100 mi). The highest peaks in the Carpathians are in the Tatra Mountains, exceeding 2,600 m (8,500 ft), closely followed by those in the Southern Carpathians in Romania, exceeding 2,550 m (8,370 ft).

The range stretches from the Western Carpathians in Austria, the Czech Republic, Slovakia, Hungary and Poland, clockwise through the Eastern Carpathians in Poland, Slovakia, Ukraine and Romania, to the Southern Carpathians in Romania and Serbia. The term Outer Carpathians is frequently used to describe the northern rim of the Western and Eastern Carpathians.

The Carpathians provide habitat for the largest European populations of brown bears, wolves, chamois, and lynxes, with the highest concentration in Romania, as well as over one-third of all European plant species. The mountains and their foothills also have many thermal and mineral waters, with Romania having one-third of the European total.

Romania is likewise home to the second-largest area of virgin forests in Europe after Russia, totaling 250,000 hectares (65%), most of them in the Carpathians, with the Southern Carpathians constituting Europe's largest unfragmented forest area. Rates of forest loss due to clearcutting, and deforestation due to illegal logging in the Carpathians are high.

== Name ==
In modern times, the range is called Karpaty in Czech, Polish and Slovak and Карпати [kɐrˈpɑtɪ] in Ukrainian, Карпати / Karpati in Serbo-Croatian, Carpați [karˈpatsʲ] in Romanian, Карпаты in Rusyn, Karpaten [kaʁˈpaːtn̩] in German and Kárpátok [ˈkaːrpaːtok] in Hungarian. Although the toponym was recorded by Ptolemy in the second century AD, the modern form of the name is a neologism in most languages.

=== Historical names ===
In late Roman documents, the Eastern Carpathian Mountains were referred to as Montes Sarmatici (meaning Sarmatian Mountains). The Western Carpathians were called Carpates, a name that is first recorded in Ptolemy's Geographia (second century AD).

In the Scandinavian Hervarar saga, which relates ancient Germanic legends about battles between Goths and Huns, the name Karpates appears in the predictable Germanic form as Harvaða fjöllum (see Grimm's law). "Inter Alpes Huniae et Oceanum est Polonia" ("Between the Hunic Alps and the ocean lies Poland") by Gervase of Tilbury, was described in his Otia Imperialia ("Recreation for an Emperor") in 1211. Thirteenth- to fifteenth-century Hungarian documents named the mountains Thorchal, Tarczal, or less frequently Montes Nivium ("Snowy Mountains").

Havasok ("Snowy Mountains") was its medieval Hungarian name. Rus' chronicles referred to it as "Hungarian Mountains". Later sources, such as Dimitrie Cantemir and the Italian chronicler Giovanandrea Gromo, referred to the range as "Transylvania's Mountains", while the 17th-century historian Constantin Cantacuzino translated the name of the mountains in an Italian-Romanian glossary to "Rumanian Mountains".

=== Etymology ===
The etymology of the Carpathians is not clearly established, but the name "Carpates" is highly associated with the old Dacian tribes called "Carpes" or "Carpi" who lived in an area to the east of the Carpathians, from the east, northeast of the Black Sea to the Transylvanian Plain in the present day Romania and Moldova.

==== Potential root words ====
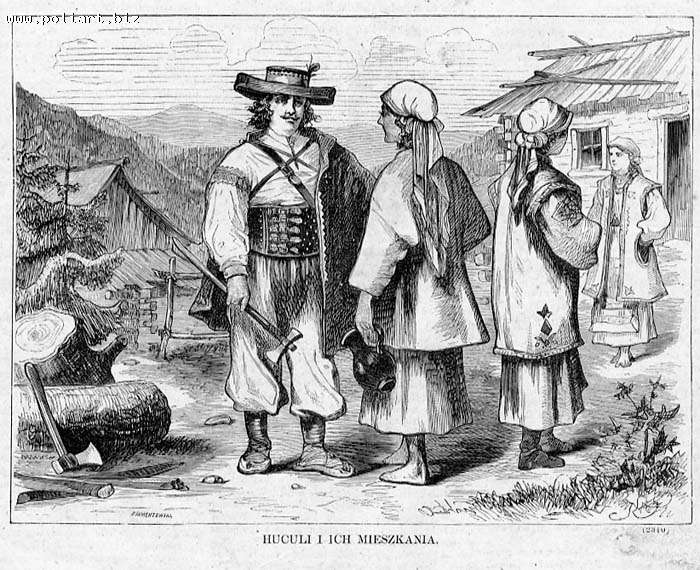
Hutsul people, living in the Carpathian mountains, c. 1872

Karpates is considered a Paleo-Balkan name, with evidence provided by the Albanian kárpë / kárpa, pl. kárpa / kárpat ('rock, stiff'), and the Messapic karpa 'tuff (rock), limestone' (preserved as càrpë 'tuff' in Bitonto dialect and càrparu 'limestone' in Salentino). This connection is further supported by the fact that also the oronym Beskydy, a series of mountain ranges in the Carpathians, has a meaning in Albanian: bjeshkë / bjeshkët 'high mountains, mountain pastures' (cf. also the Albanian oronym Bjeshkët e Namuna, the Accursed Mountains / Albanian Alps).

The name Carpates may ultimately be from the Proto Indo-European root *sker-/*ker-, which meant mountain, rock, or rugged (cf. Albanian kárpë, Germanic root *skerp-, Old Norse harfr "harrow", Gothic skarpo, Middle Low German scharf "potsherd", and Modern High German Scherbe "shard", Lithuanian kar~pas "cut, hack, notch", Latvian cìrpt "to shear, clip"). The archaic Polish word karpa meant 'rugged irregularities, underwater obstacles/rocks, rugged roots, or trunks'. The more common word skarpa means a sharp cliff or other vertical terrain, cf. Old English scearp and English sharp.

The name may instead come from Indo-European *kwerp 'to turn', akin to Old English hweorfan 'to turn, change' (English warp) and Greek καρπός karpós 'wrist' (Karpathos island has the same root word), perhaps referring to the way the Carpathian mountain range bends or veers in an L-shape.

== Geography ==
Topographic map of the Carpathian Mountains, showing their distribution from the far eastern Czech Republic (3%) and Austria (1%) through Slovakia (21%), Poland (10%), Ukraine (10%), Romania (50%) to Serbia (5%).

Although commonly referred to as a mountain chain, the Carpathians do not form an uninterrupted chain of mountains, but consist of several orographically and geologically distinctive groups. The northwestern Carpathians begin in Slovakia and southern Poland. They surround Transcarpathia and Transylvania in a large semicircle, sweeping towards the southeast, and end on the Danube near Orșova in Romania. The total length of the Carpathians is over 1,500 km (930 mi).

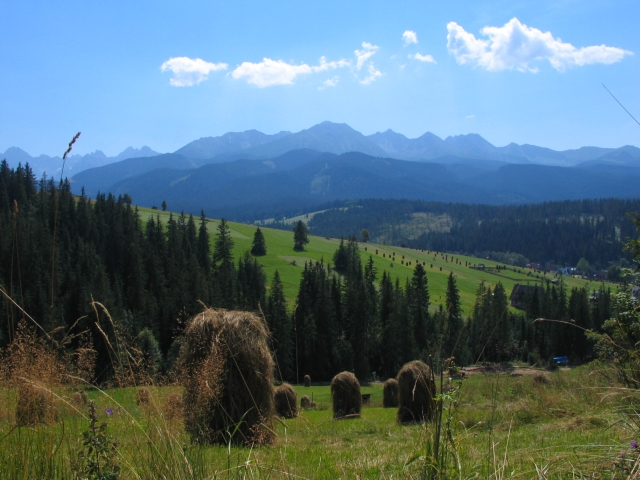
View of Tatry from Bukowina Tatrzańska, Poland

The mountain chain's width varies between 12 and 500 km (7 and 311 mi). The highest altitudes of the Carpathians occur where they are widest, in the Transylvanian plateau and in the southern Tatra Mountains group. The highest range, in which Gerlachovský štít in Slovakia is the highest peak, is 2,655 m (8,711 ft) above sea level.

The Carpathians cover an area of 190,000 km^{2} (73,000 sq mi). After the Alps, they form the next-most extensive mountain system in Europe. Percentage of the range by country is: Czech Republic (3%) and Austria (1%) in the northwest through Slovakia (21%), Poland (10%), Ukraine (10%), Romania (50%) to Serbia (5%) in the south.

It was believed that no area of the Carpathian range was covered in snow all year round and there were no glaciers, but recent research by Polish scientists discovered one permafrost and glacial area in the Tatra Mountains.

=== Comparison with the Alps ===
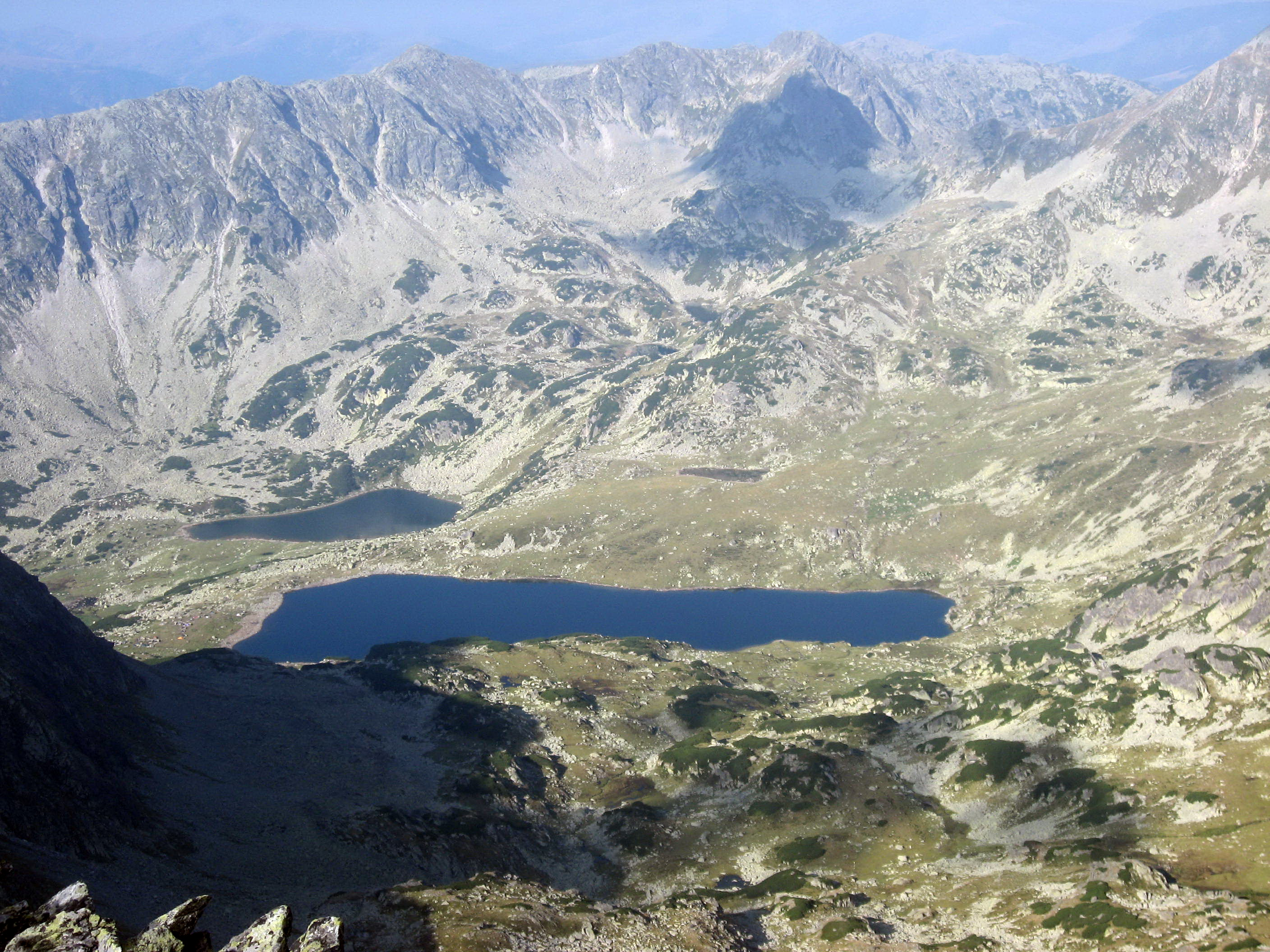
Lake Bucura, Southern Carpathians, Romania

The Carpathians, which attain an altitude over 2,500 m (8,200 ft) in only a few places, lack the bold peaks, extensive snowfields, large glaciers, high waterfalls, and numerous large lakes that are common in the Alps. The Carpathians at their highest altitude are only as high as the middle region of the Alps, with which they share a common appearance, climate, and flora.

The Carpathians are separated from the Alps by the Danube, only meeting at the Leitha Mountains at Bratislava. The valley of the March and Oder separates the Carpathians from the Silesian and Moravian chains, which belong to the middle wing of the great Central Mountain System of Europe.

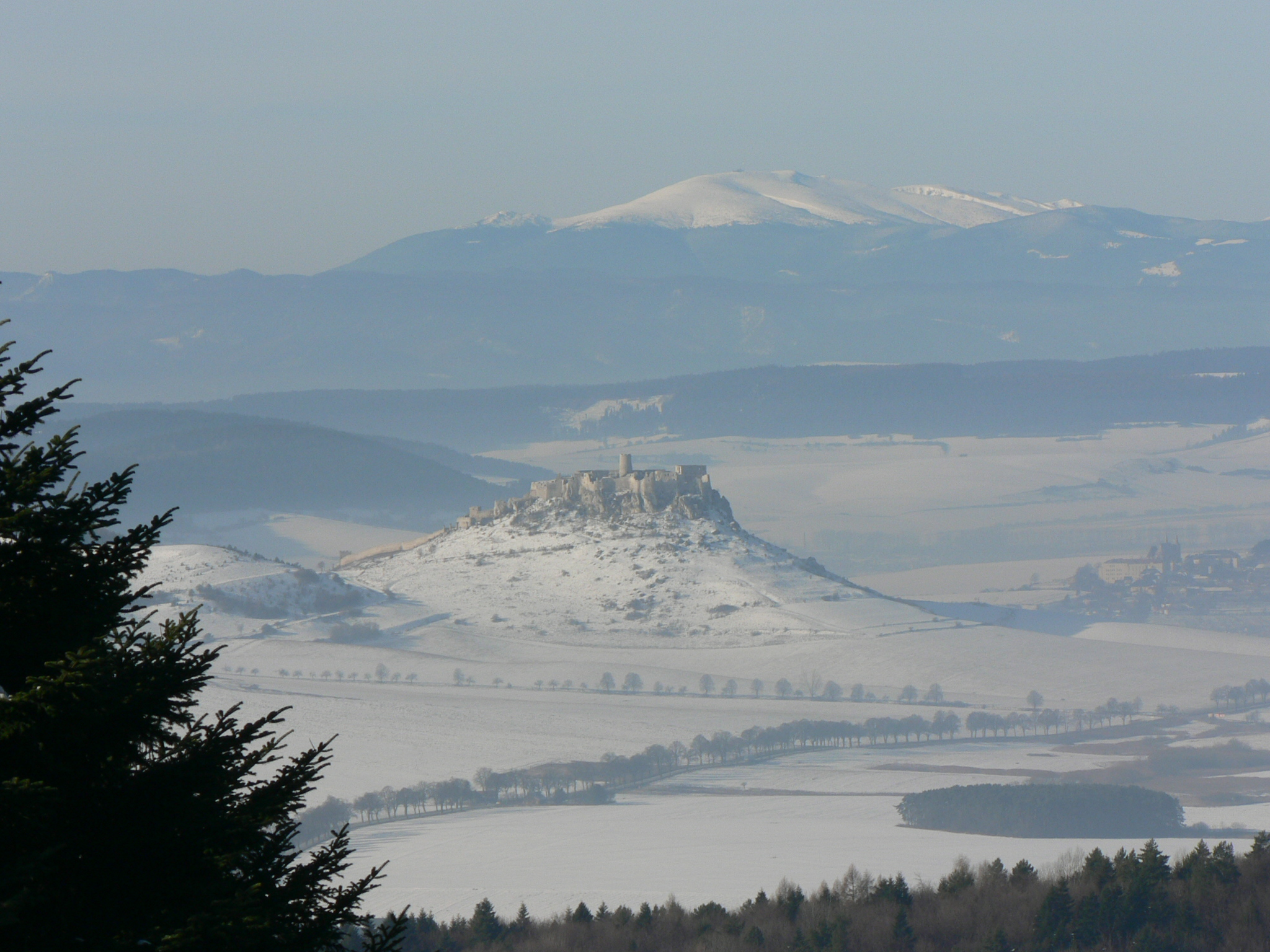
View of Spiš Castle in Slovakia, from the Branisko Pass

Unlike the other wings of the system, the Carpathians, which form the watershed between the northern seas and the Black Sea, are surrounded on all sides by plains. The Pannonian plain is to the southwest, the Lower Danubian Plain to the south, with the southern part being in Bulgaria, and the northern – in (Romania), and the Galician plain to the northeast.

=== Mountain passes ===
In the Romanian part of the main chain of the Carpathians, mountain passes include Prislop Pass, Tihuța Pass, Bicaz Canyon, Ghimeș Pass, Buzău Pass, Predeal Pass (crossed by the railway from Brașov to Bucharest), Turnu Roșu Pass (1,115 ft., running through the narrow gorge of the Olt River and crossed by the railway from Sibiu to Bucharest), Vulcan Pass, and the Iron Gate (both crossed by the railway from Timișoara to Craiova).

== Geology ==
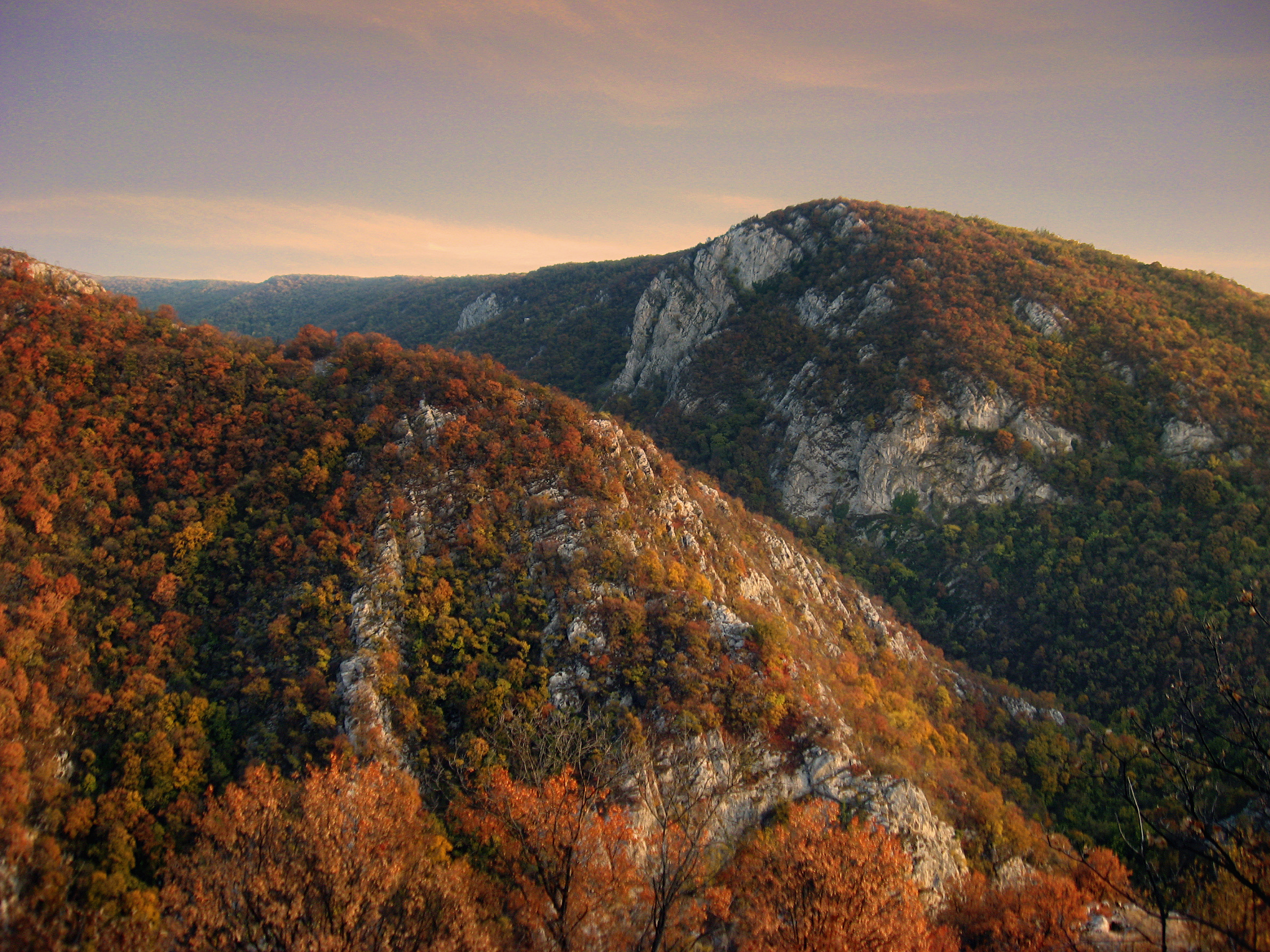
Kučaj in Serbia

The area now occupied by the Carpathians was once occupied by smaller ocean basins. The Carpathian mountains were formed during the Alpine orogeny in the Mesozoic and Cenozoic by moving the ALCAPA (Alpine-Carpathian-Pannonian), Tisza and Dacia plates over subducting oceanic crust.

The mountains take the form of a fold and thrust belt with generally north vergence in the western segment, northeast to east vergence in the eastern portion and southeast vergence in the southern portion. Currently, the area is the most seismically active in Central Europe.

The external, generally northern, portion of the orogenic belt is a Tertiary accretionary wedge of a so-called Flysch belt (the Carpathian Flysch Belt) created by rocks scraped off the sea bottom and thrust over the North-European plate. The Carpathian accretionary wedge is made of several thin skinned nappes composed of Cretaceous to Paleogene turbidites. Thrusting of the Flysch nappes over the Carpathian foreland caused the formation of the Carpathian foreland basin. The boundary between the Flysch belt and internal zones of the orogenic belt in the western segment of the mountain range is marked by the Pieniny Klippen Belt, a narrow complicated zone of polyphase compressional deformation, later involved in a supposed strike-slip zone.

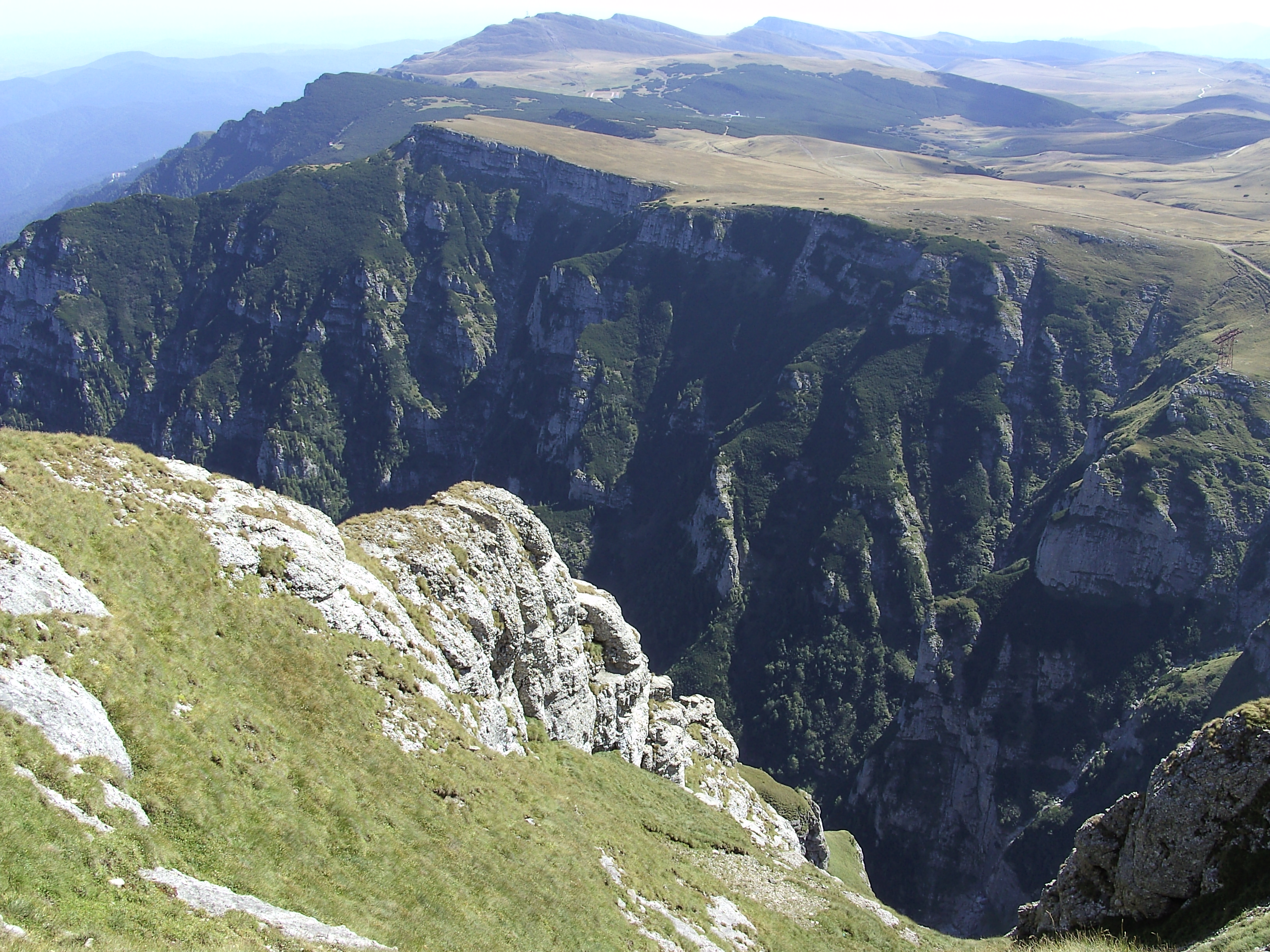
Bucegi Mountains in Romania

Internal zones in western and eastern segments contain older Variscan igneous massifs reworked in Mesozoic thick and thin-skinned nappes. During the Middle Miocene this zone was affected by intensive calc-alkaline arc volcanism that developed over the subduction zone of the flysch basins. At the same time, the internal zones of the orogenic belt were affected by large extensional structure of the back-arc Pannonian Basin. The last volcanic activity occurred at Ciomadul about 30,000 years ago.

The mountains started to gain their current shape from the latest Miocene onward. At some locations solifluction deposits have formed on the slopes of the Carpathians. Iron, gold and silver were found in great quantities in the Western Carpathians. After the Roman emperor Trajan's conquest of Dacia, he brought back to Rome over 165 tons of gold and 330 tons of silver.

== Ecology ==
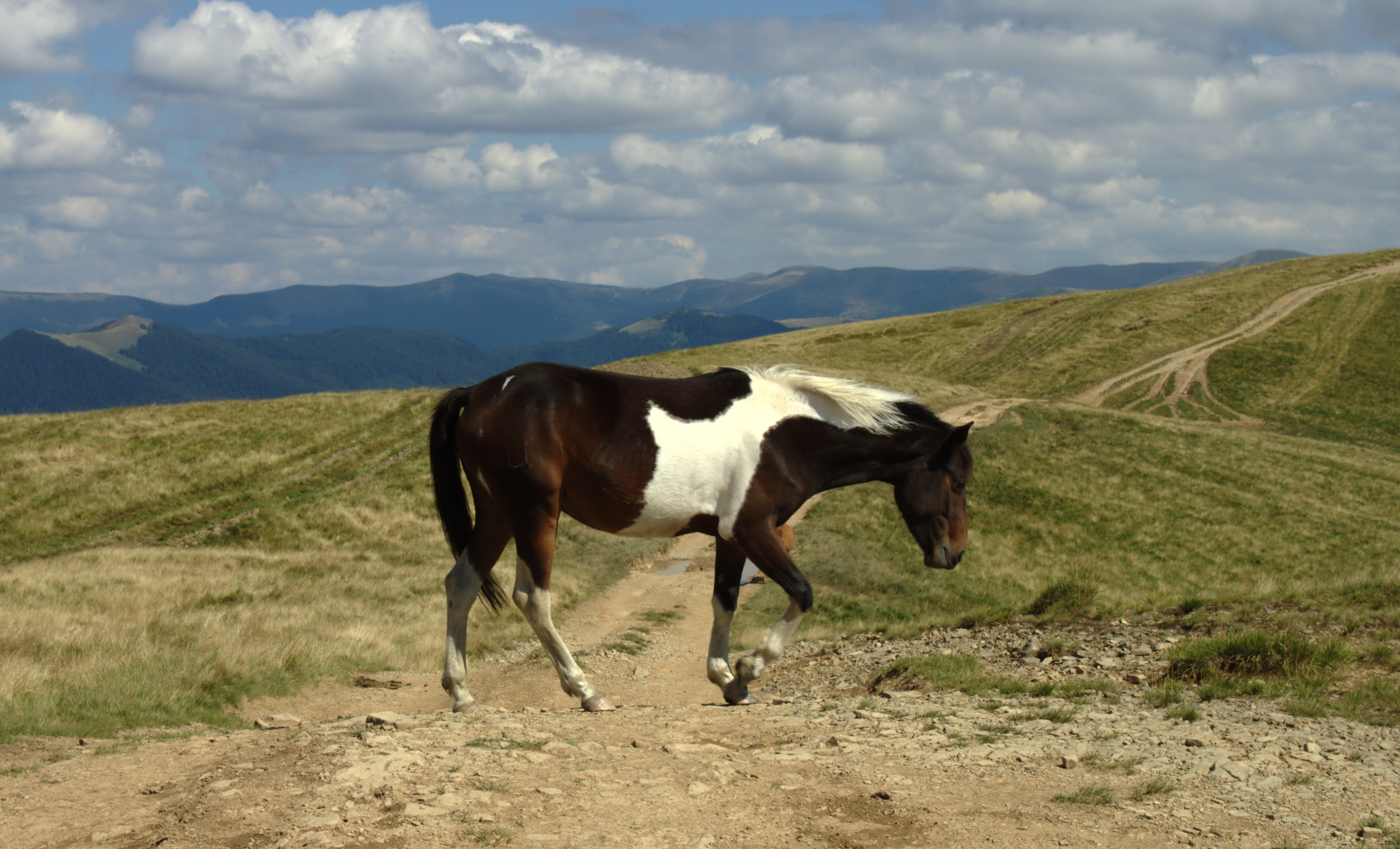
A horse atop the Krasna mountain range in Ukraine's Zakarpattia Oblast

The ecology of the Carpathians varies with altitude, ranging from lowland forests to alpine meadows. Foothill forests are primarily of broadleaf deciduous trees, including oak, hornbeam, and linden. European beech is characteristic of the montane forest zone. Higher-elevation subalpine forests are characterized by Norway spruce (Picea abies). Krummholz and alpine meadows occur above the treeline.

Wildlife in the Carpathians includes Eurasian brown bear (Ursus arctos arctos), Eurasian wolf (Canis lupus lupus), Eurasian lynx (Lynx lynx), European wildcat (Felis silvestris), Tatra chamois (Rupicapra rupicapra tatrica), European bison (Bison bonasus), and golden eagle (Aquila chrysaetos).

== Divisions of the Carpathians ==
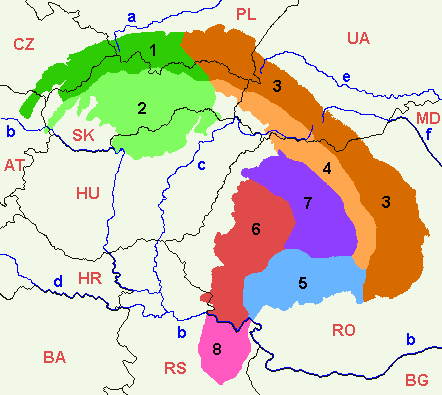
A map of the main divisions of the Carpathians.: 1. Outer Western Carpathians; 2. Inner Western Carpathians; 3. Outer Eastern Carpathians; 4. Inner Eastern Carpathians; 5. Southern Carpathians; 6. Western Romanian Carpathians; 7. Transylvanian Plateau; 8. Serbian Carpathians

In geopolitical terms, Carpathian Mountains are often grouped and labeled according to national or regional borders, but such division has turned out to be relative, since it was, and still is dependent on frequent historical, political and administrative changes of national or regional borders. According to modern geopolitical division, Carpathians can be grouped as: Serbian, Romanian, Ukrainian, Polish, Slovak, Czech and Austrian. Within each nation, specific classifications of the Carpathians have been developing, often reflecting local traditions, and thus creating terminological diversity, that produces various challenges in the fields of comparative classification and international systematization.

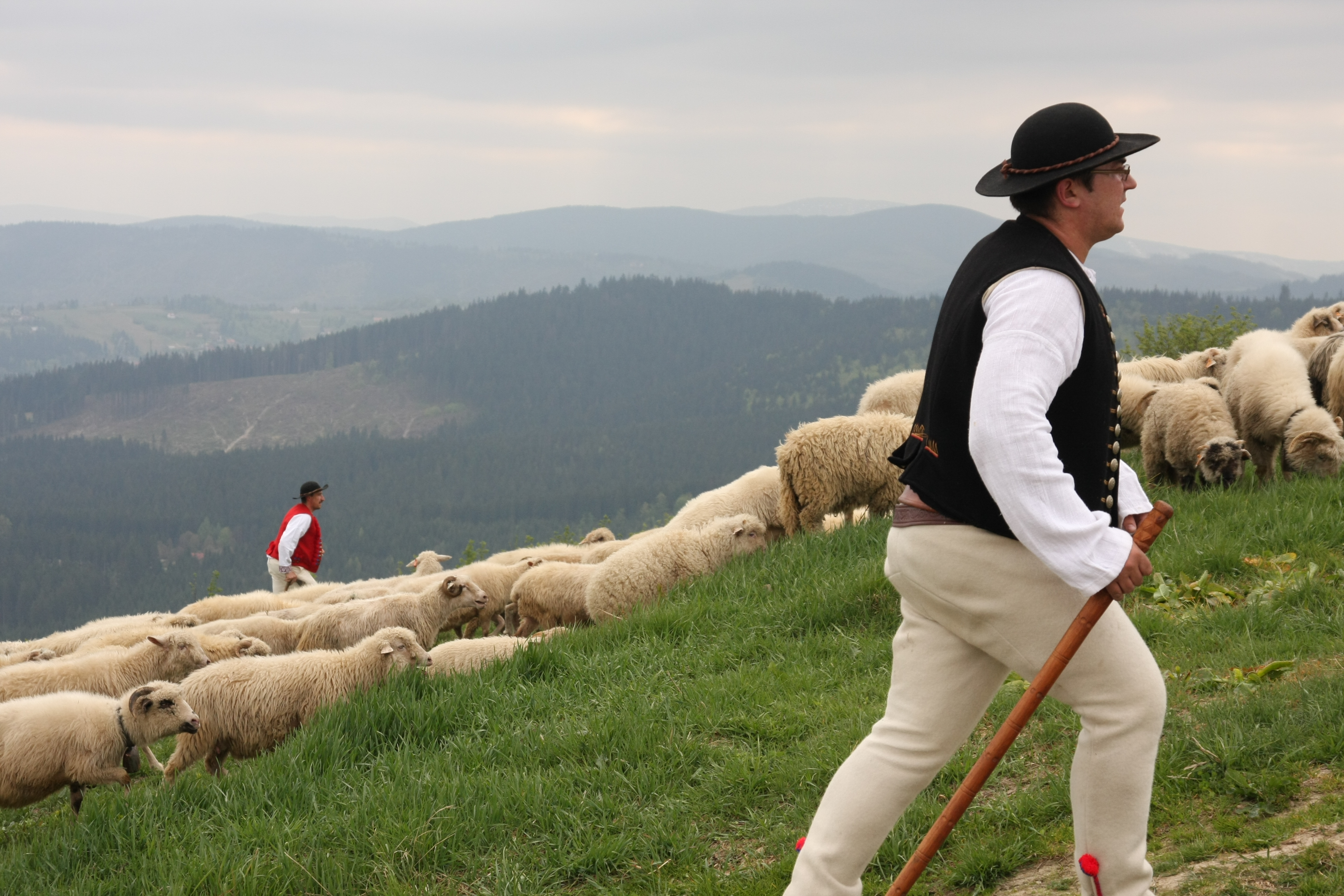
Shepherds in Beskids

A major part of the western and northeastern Outer Eastern Carpathians in Poland, Ukraine, and Slovakia is traditionally called the Eastern Beskids.The border between the eastern and southern Carpathians is formed by the Predeal Pass, south of Brașov and the Prahova Valley.

The geological border between the Western and Eastern Carpathians runs approximately along the line (south to north) between the towns of Michalovce, Bardejov, Nowy Sącz and Tarnów. In older systems the border runs more in the east, along the line (north to south) along the rivers San and Osława (Poland), the town of Snina (Slovakia) and river Tur'ia (Ukraine). Biologists shift the border even further to the east.

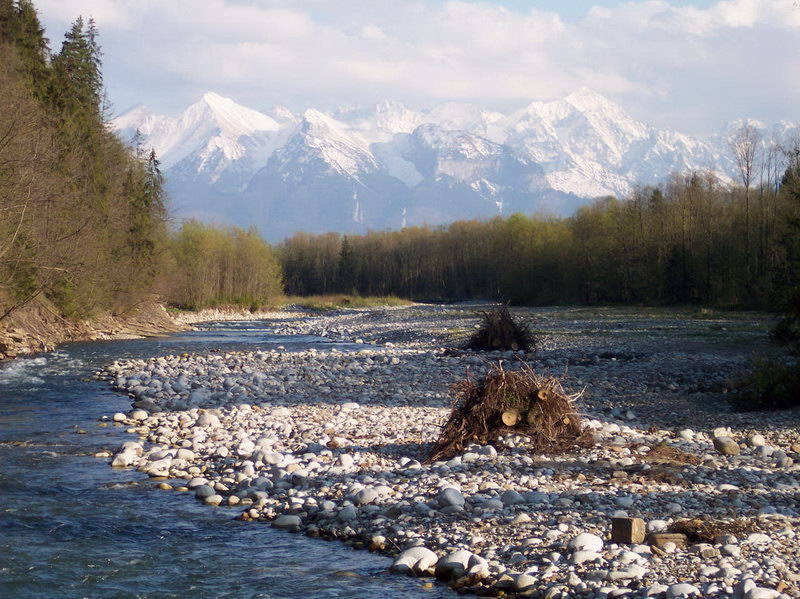
Tatra Mountains in southern Poland

The section of the Carpathians within the borders of Romania is commonly known as the Romanian Carpathians. In local use, Romanians sometimes denote as "Eastern Carpathians" only the Romanian part of the Eastern Carpathians, which lies on their territory (i.e., from the Ukrainian border or from the Prislop Pass to the south), which they subdivide into three simplified geographical groups (northern, central, southern), instead of Outer and Inner Eastern Carpathians. These groups are:

- Maramureș-Bukovinian Carpathians (Romanian: Carpații Maramureșului și ai Bucovinei)
- Moldavian-Transylvanian Carpathians (Romanian: Carpații Moldo-Transilvani)
- Curvature Carpathians (Romanian: Carpații Curburii, Carpații de Curbură)

The section of the Carpathians within the borders of Ukraine is commonly known as the Ukrainian Carpathians. Classification of eastern sections of the Carpathians is particularly complex, since it was influenced by several overlapping traditions. Terms like Wooded Carpathians, Poloniny Mountains or Eastern Beskids are often used in varying scopes by authors belonging to different traditions.

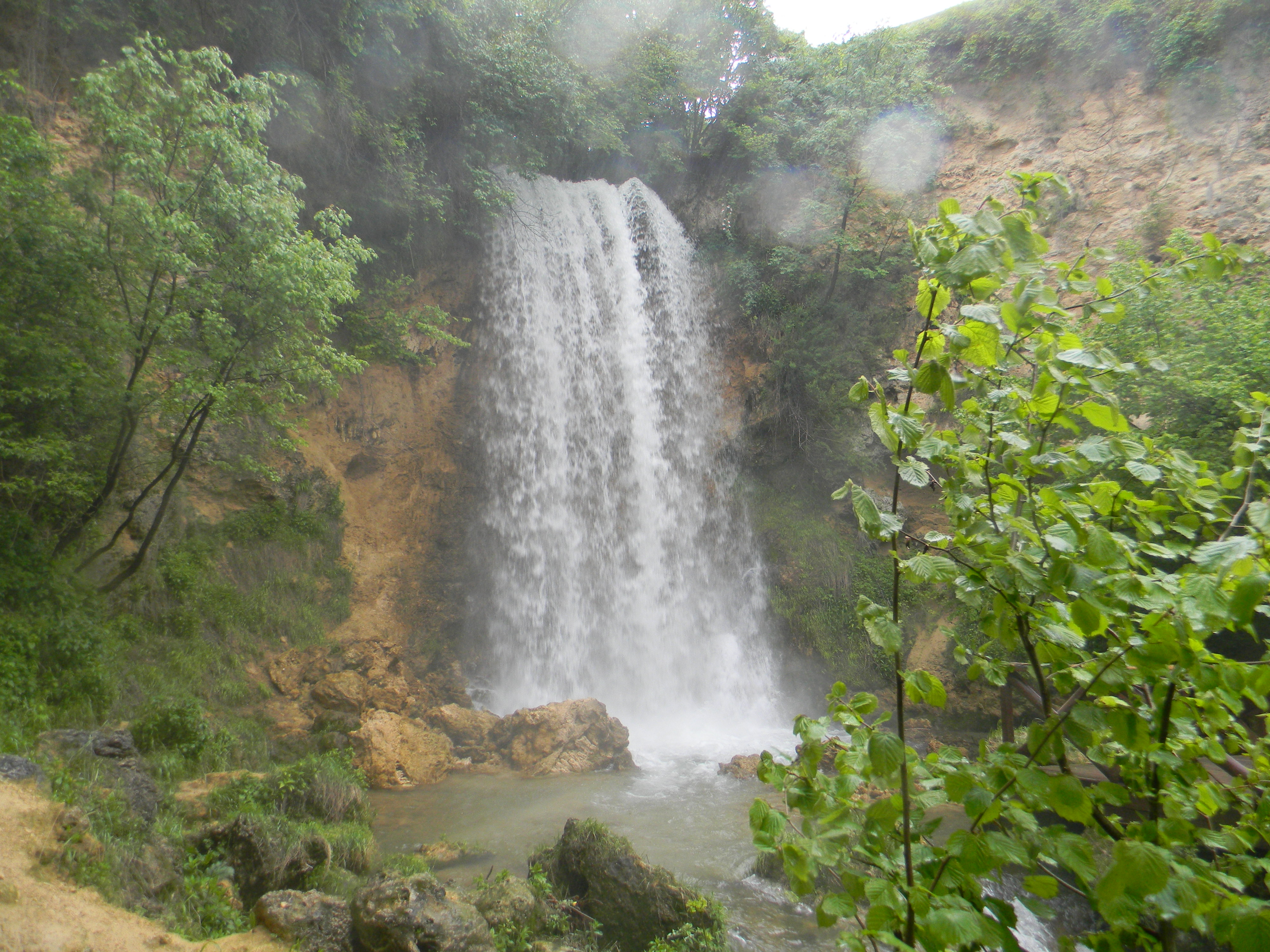
Beljanica region waterfall

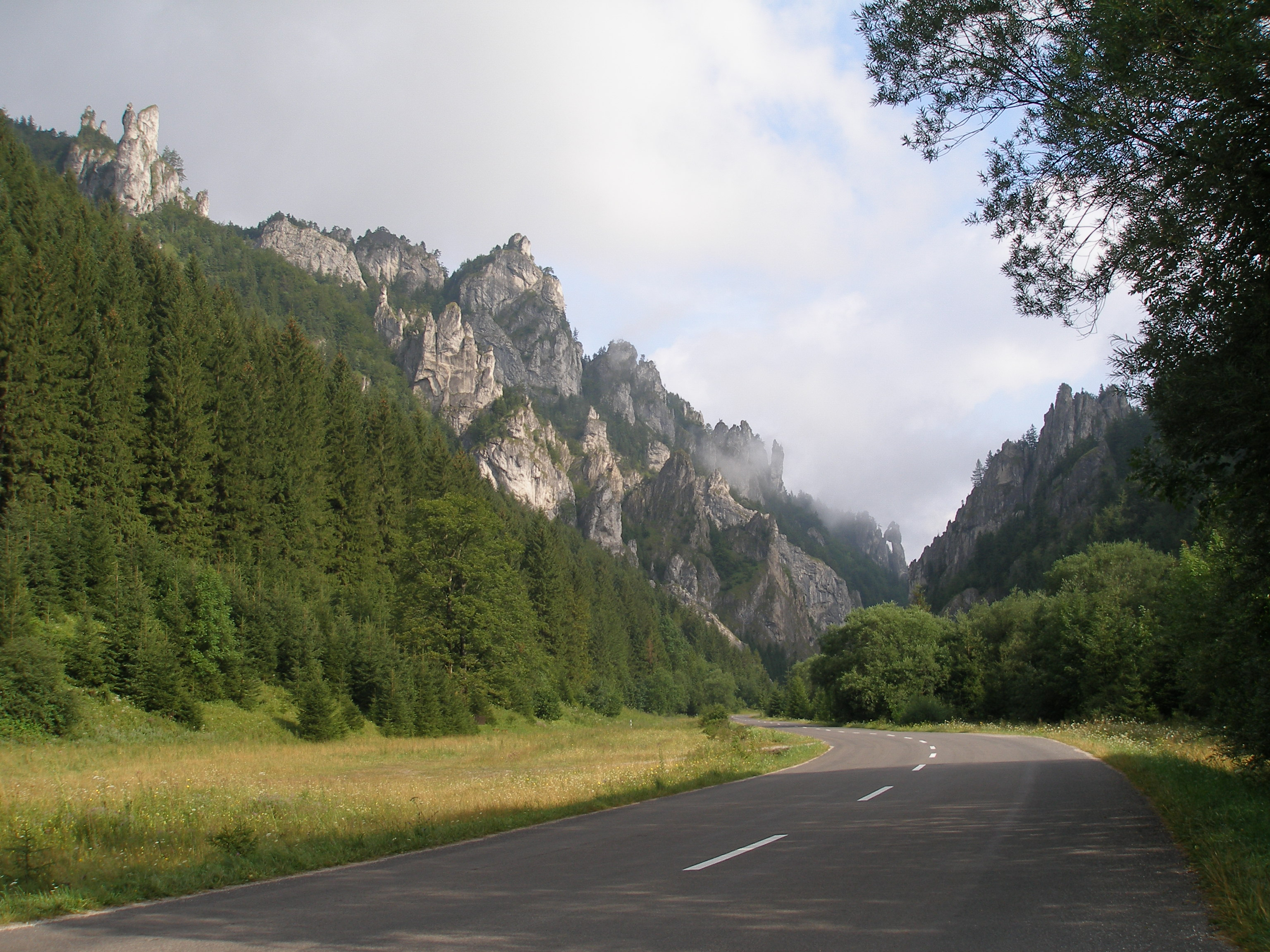
Vrátna dolina, Slovakia

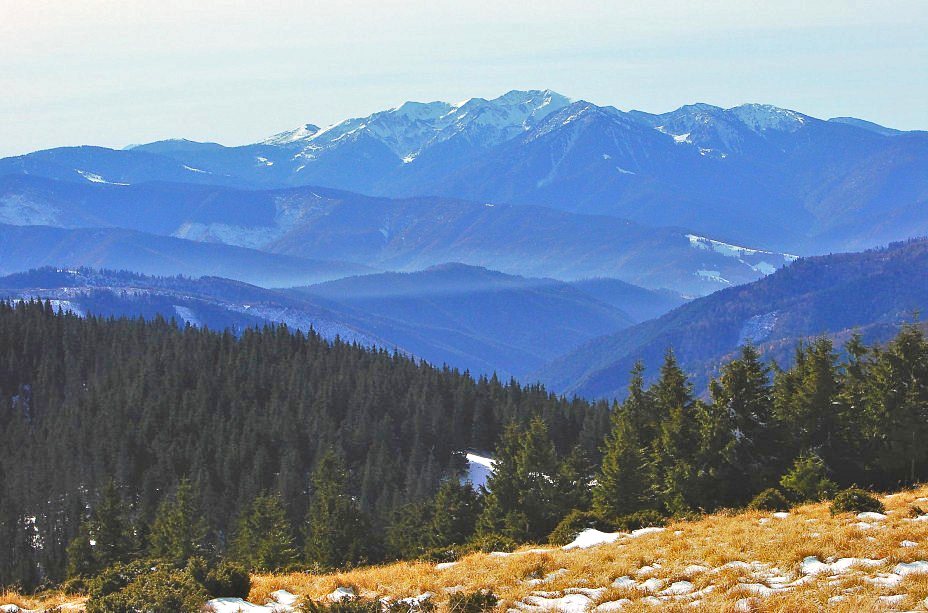
Maramureș. Mountains in the north of Romania and the west of Ukraine

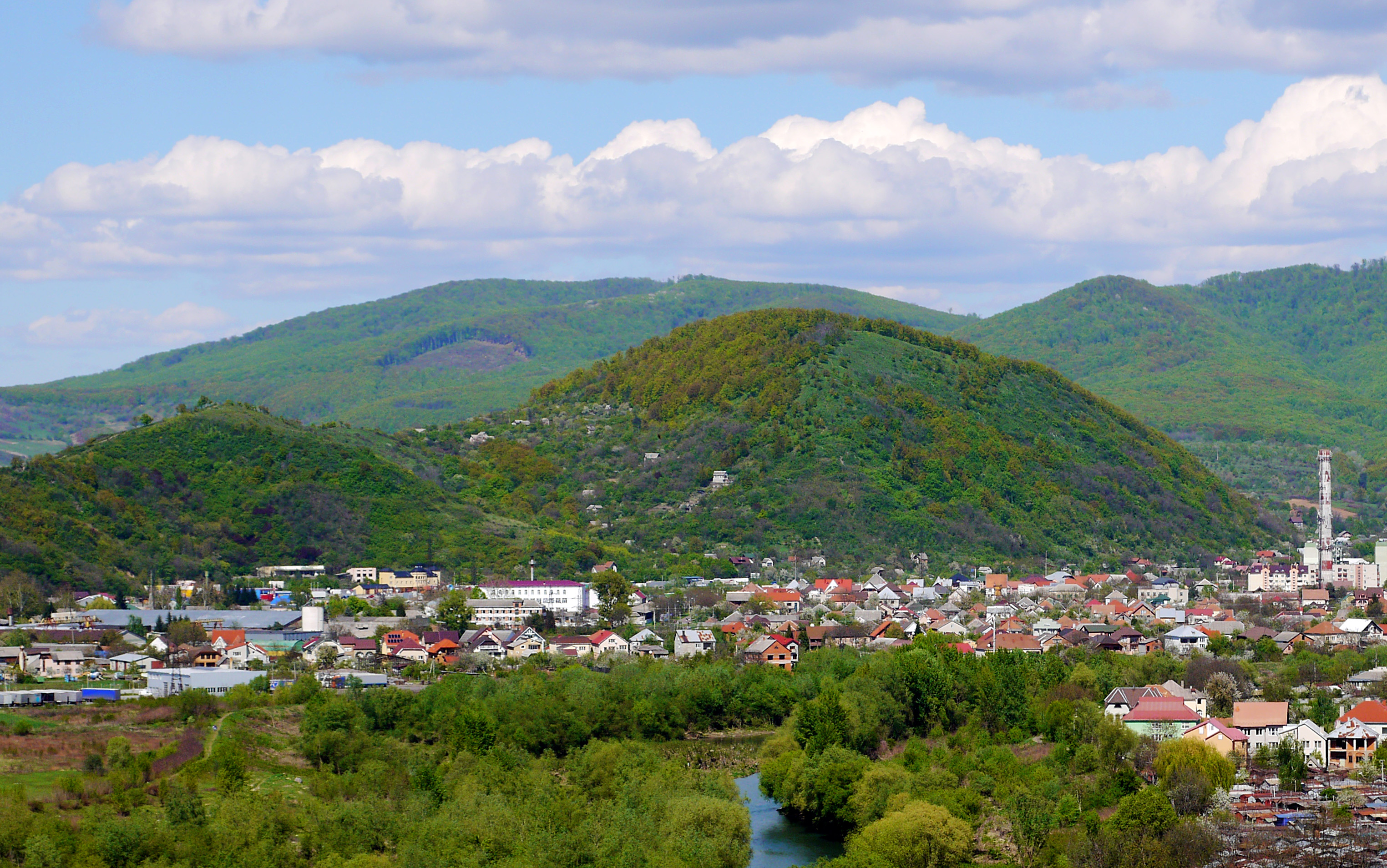
Mukachevo, Western Ukraine

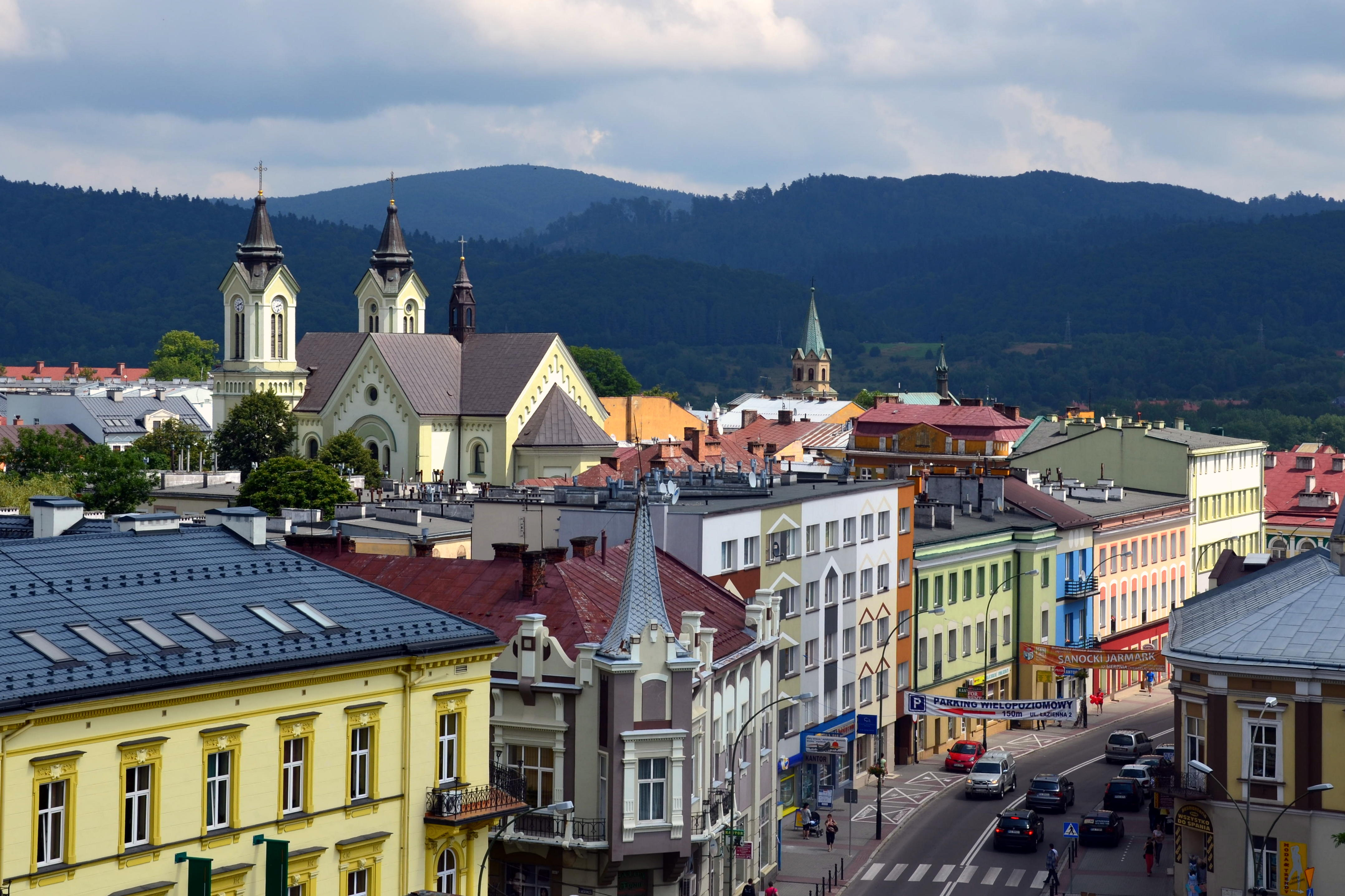
View from Sanok in Poland

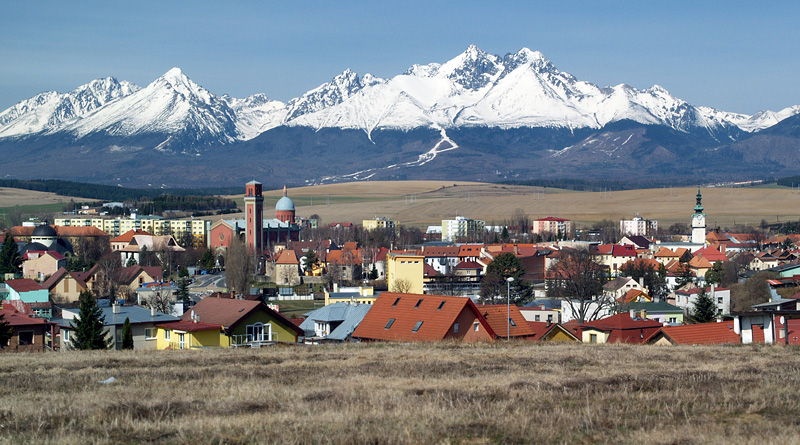
Kežmarok in Slovakia

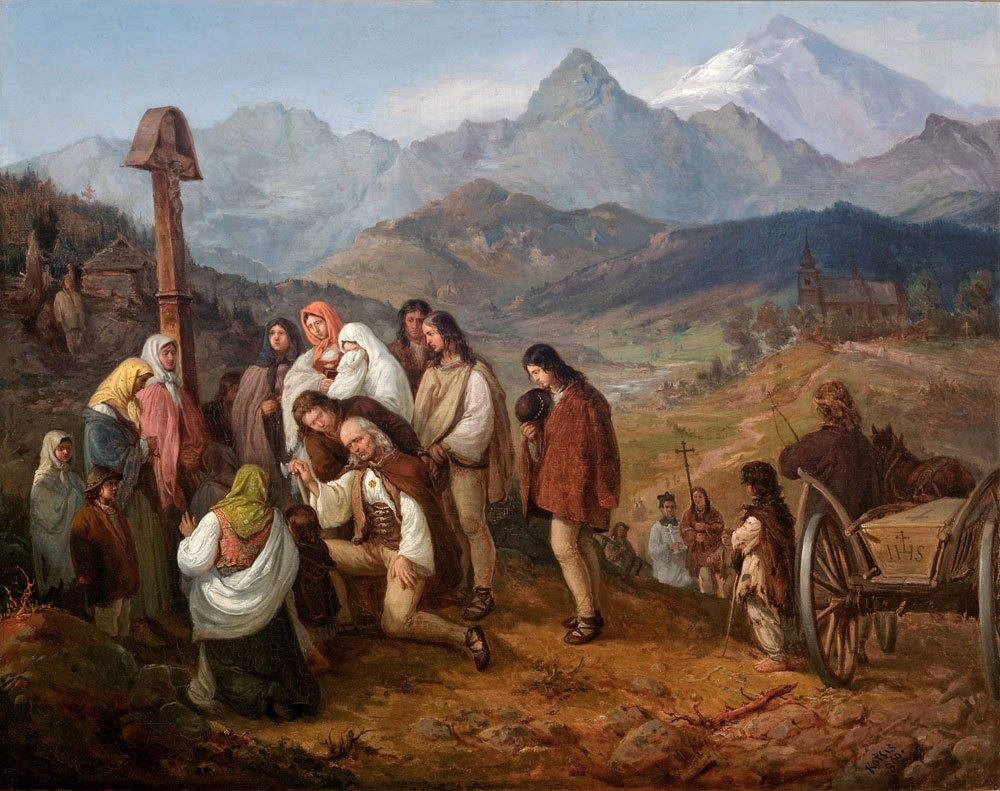
Gorals in the Polish Carpathians

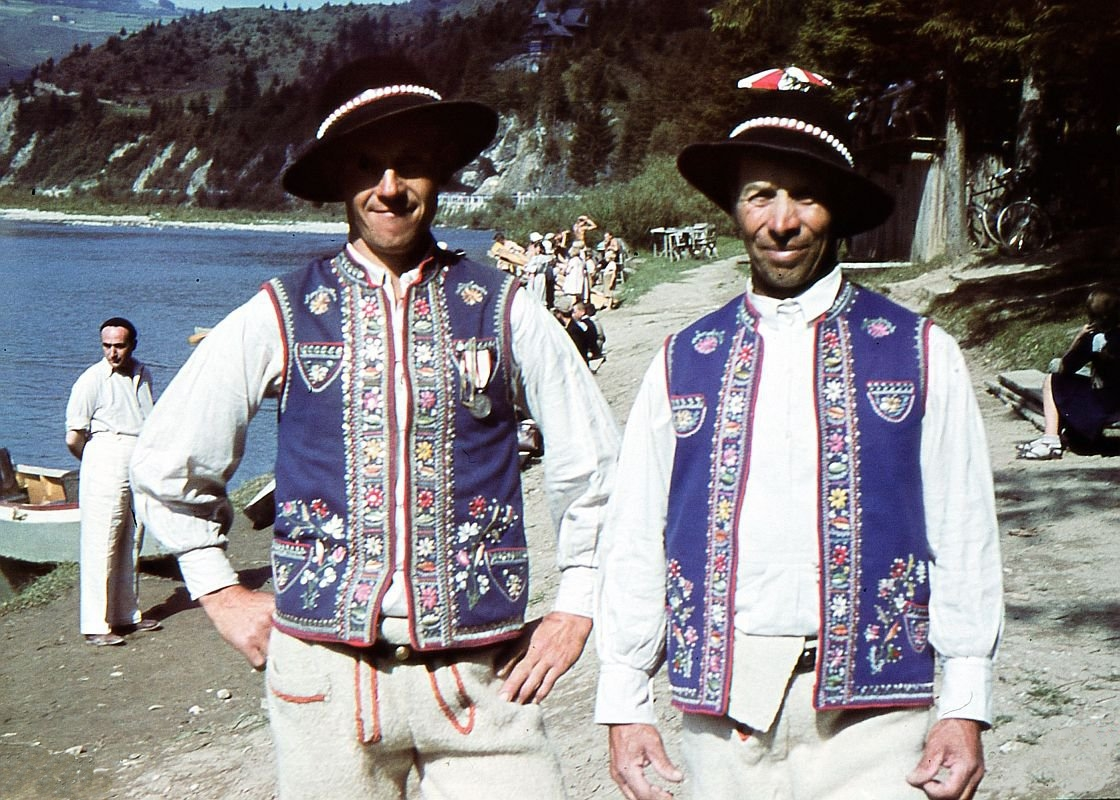
Szczawnica in Poland, Pieniny, 1939

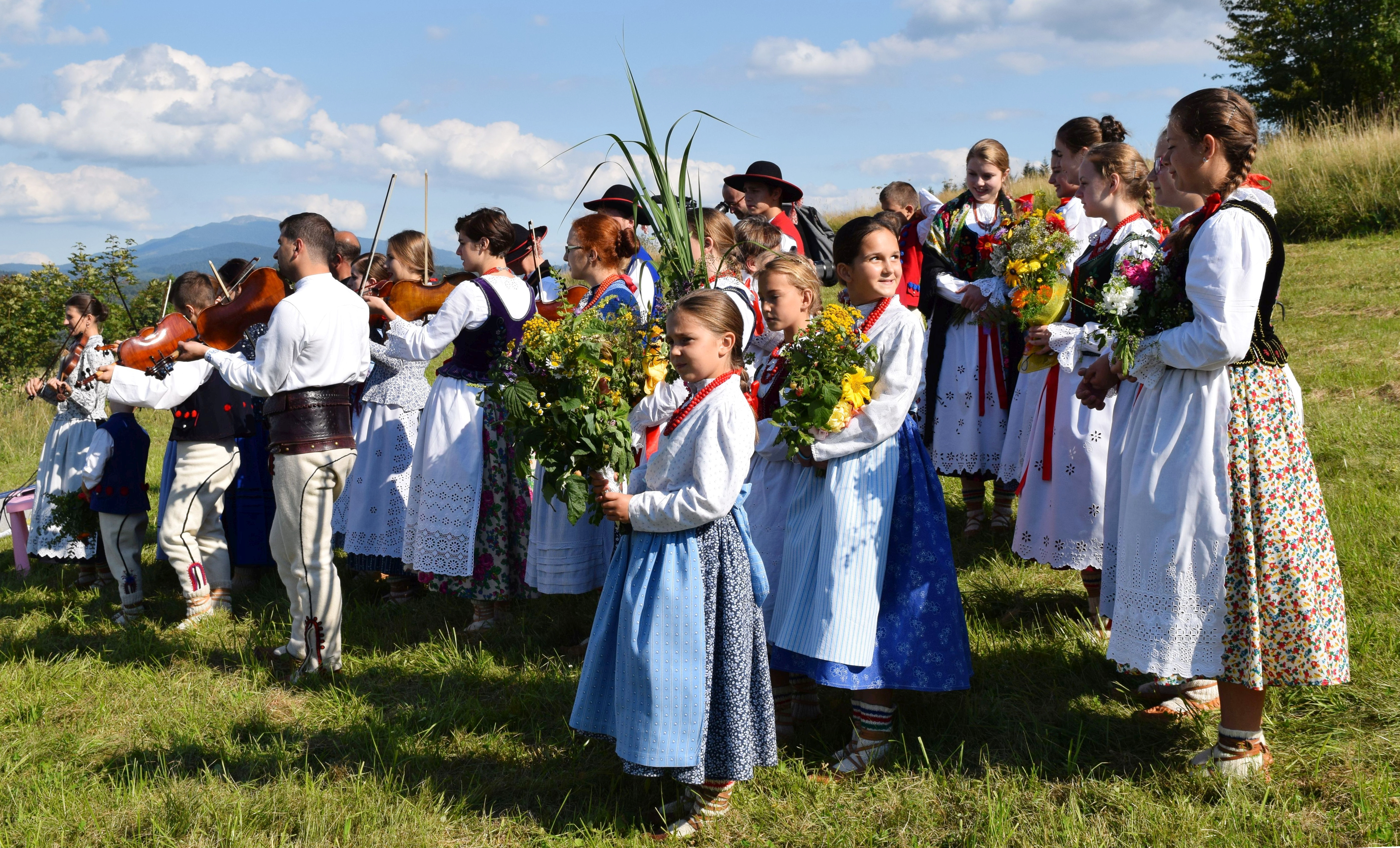
The Feast of the Assumption of Mary in the Polish Carpathians

=== Highest peaks ===
This is an (incomplete) list of the peaks of the Carpathians having summits over 2,500 metres (8,200 ft), with their heights, geologic divisions, and locations.

| Peak | Geologic divisions | Nation (Nations) | County (Counties) | Height (m) | Height (ft) |
|---|---|---|---|---|---|
| Gerlachovský štít | High Tatras | Slovakia | Prešov Region | 2,655 | 8,711 |
| Gerlachovská veža | High Tatras | Slovakia | Prešov Region | 2,642 | 8,668 |
| Lomnický štít | High Tatras | Slovakia | Prešov Region | 2,633 | 8,638 |
| Ľadový štít | High Tatras | Slovakia | Prešov Region | 2,627 | 8,619 |
| Pyšný štít | High Tatras | Slovakia | Prešov Region | 2,623 | 8,606 |
| Zadný Gerlach | High Tatras | Slovakia | Prešov Region | 2,616 | 8,583 |
| Lavínový štít | High Tatras | Slovakia | Prešov Region | 2,606 | 8,550 |
| Malý Ľadový štít | High Tatras | Slovakia | Prešov Region | 2,602 | 8,537 |
| Kotlový štít | High Tatras | Slovakia | Prešov Region | 2,601 | 8,533 |
| Lavínová veža | High Tatras | Slovakia | Prešov Region | 2,600 | 8,500 |
| Malý Pyšný štít | High Tatras | Slovakia | Prešov Region | 2,591 | 8,501 |
| Veľká Litvorová veža | High Tatras | Slovakia | Prešov Region | 2,581 | 8,468 |
| Strapatá veža | High Tatras | Slovakia | Prešov Region | 2,565 | 8,415 |
| Kežmarský štít | High Tatras | Slovakia | Prešov Region | 2,556 | 8,386 |
| Vysoká | High Tatras | Slovakia | Prešov Region | 2,547 | 8,356 |
| Moldoveanu | Făgăraș Mountains | Romania | Argeș | 2,544 | 8,346 |
| Negoiu | Făgăraș Mountains | Romania | Sibiu | 2,535 | 8,317 |
| Viștea Mare | Făgăraș Mountains | Romania | Brașov | 2,527 | 8,291 |
| Parângu Mare | Parâng Mountains | Romania | Alba, Gorj, Hunedoara | 2,519 | 8,264 |
| Lespezi | Făgăraș Mountains | Romania | Sibiu | 2,517 | 8,258 |
| Peleaga | Retezat Mountains | Romania | Hunedoara | 2,509 | 8,232 |
| Păpușa | Retezat Mountains | Romania | Hunedoara | 2,508 | 8,228 |
| Vânătoarea lui Buteanu | Făgăraș Mountains | Romania | Argeș | 2,507 | 8,225 |
| Omu (mountain) | Bucegi Mountains | Romania | Prahova, Brașov, Dâmbovița | 2,514 | 8,248 |
| Cornul Călțunului | Făgăraș Mountains | Romania | Sibiu | 2,505 | 8,219 |
| Ocolit (Bucura) | Bucegi Mountains | Romania | Prahova, Brașov, Dâmbovița | 2,503 | 8,212 |
| Rysy | High Tatras | Poland, Slovakia | Lesser Poland Voivodeship, Prešov Region | 2,503 | 8,212 |
| Dara | Făgăraș Mountains | Romania | Sibiu | 2,500 | 8,200 |

=== Highest peaks by country ===
This is a list of the highest national peaks of the Carpathians, their heights, geologic divisions, and locations.

| Peak | Geologic divisions | Nation (Nations) | County (Counties) | Height (m) | Height (ft) |
|---|---|---|---|---|---|
| Gerlachovský štít | High Tatras | Slovakia | Prešov Region | 2,655 | 8,711 |
| Moldoveanu | Făgăraș Mountains | Romania | Argeș | 2,544 | 8,346 |
| Rysy | High Tatras | Poland | Tatra County | 2,499 | 8,199 |
| Hoverla | Eastern Beskids (Chornohora) | Ukraine | Nadvirna Raion, Rakhiv Raion | 2,061 | 6,762 |
| Rtanj | Serbian Carpathians | Serbia | Zaječar District | 1,565 | 5,135 |
| Lysá hora | Moravian-Silesian Beskids | Czech Republic | Moravian-Silesian Region | 1,323 | 4,341 |
| Kékes | Mátra-Slanec Area (Mátra) | Hungary | Heves County | 1,014 | 3,327 |
| Hundsheimer Berg | Hundsheimer Berge | Austria | Niederösterreich | 481 | 1,578 |

=== Cities and towns ===
The table and the list may contain some localities near the Carpathians, not only in these mountains.

Largest cities. Data based on their articles. Highest elevation if available (otherwise might be the average elevation).
| City | Country | Population | Highest elevation [m] | Latitude | Longitude |
|---|---|---|---|---|---|
| Kraków | Poland | 804,237 | 383 | 50°03′41″N | 19°56′14″E |
| Banská Bystrica | Slovakia | 74,590 | 368 | 48°44′07″N | 19°08′43″E |
| Bratislava | Slovakia | 475,503 | 514 | 48°08′38″N | 17°06′35″E |
| Cluj-Napoca | Romania | 286,598 | 340 | 46°46′N | 23°35′E |
| Chernivtsi | Ukraine | 264,298 | 248 | 48°18′0″N | 25°56′0″E |
| Brașov | Romania | 237,589 | 538 | 45°40′N | 25°37′E |
| Košice | Slovakia | 225,044 | 206 | 48°43′N | 21°15′E |
| Ivano-Frankivsk | Ukraine | 238,196 | 260 | 48°55′22″N | 24°42′38″E |
| Oradea | Romania | 183,105 | 142 | 47°04′20″N | 21°55′16″E |
| Bielsko-Biała | Poland | 165,127 | 1,117 | 49°49′21″N | 19°2′40″E |
| Miskolc | Hungary | 143,502 | 945 | 48°06′15″N | 20°47′30″E |
| Sibiu | Romania | 134,309 | 415 | 45°47′34″N | 24°09′07″E |
| Târgu Mureș | Romania | 116,033 | 320 | 46°32′44″N | 24°33′45″E |
| Baia Mare | Romania | 108,759 | 228 | 47°39′24″N | 23°34′19″E |
| Uzhhorod | Ukraine | 115,449 | 169 | 48°37′26″N | 22°17′42″E |
| Tarnów | Poland | 105,922 | 384 | 50°00′45″N | 20°59′19″E |
| Râmnicu Vâlcea | Romania | 93,151 | 250 | 45°6′17″N | 24°22′32″E |
| Prešov | Slovakia | 82,927 | 296 | 49°00′06″N | 21°14′22″E |
| Mukachevo | Ukraine | 85,569 | 125 | 48°27′00″N | 22°45′00″E |
| Drohobych | Ukraine | 73,682 | 371 | 49°21′00″N | 23°30′00″E |

Smaller cities and towns:

- Piatra Neamț (Romania)
- Nowy Sącz (Poland)
- Suceava (Romania)
- Vršac (Serbia)
- Târgu Jiu (Romania)
- Drobeta-Turnu Severin (Romania)
- Reșița (Romania)
- Žilina (Slovakia)
- Bistrița (Romania)
- Zvolen (Slovakia)
- Deva (Romania)
- Zlín (Czech Republic)
- Hunedoara (Romania)
- Martin (Slovakia)
- Zalău (Romania)
- Przemyśl (Poland)
- Krosno (Poland)
- Sanok (Poland)
- Alba Iulia (Romania)
- Sfântu Gheorghe (Romania)
- Turda (Romania)
- Mediaș (Romania)
- Poprad (Slovakia)
- Spišská Nová Ves (Slovakia)
- Petroșani (Romania)
- Miercurea Ciuc (Romania)
- Făgăraș (Romania)
- Odorheiu Secuiesc (Romania)
- Boryslav (Ukraine)
- Jasło (Poland)
- Cieszyn (Poland)
- Nowy Targ (Poland)
- Żywiec (Poland)
- Zakopane (Poland)
- Petrila (Romania)
- Cugir (Romania)
- Târgu Neamț (Romania)
- Câmpulung Moldovenesc (Romania)
- Gheorgheni (Romania)
- Rakhiv (Ukraine)
- Vatra Dornei (Romania)
- Rabka-Zdrój (Poland)
- Bor (Serbia)

== See also ==
- Karpatka—A Polish dessert named after the Carpathians
- RMS Carpathia a British ocean liner named after the Carpathians that rescued survivors of the RMS Titanic
- The Living Fire—A Ukrainian documentary film about the life of Carpathian shepherds
- Sudetes—A neighbouring mountain system whose uplift is related to that of the Carpathians
- Illegal logging in Southeast and Eastern Europe
- Tourism in Poland
- Tourism in Romania
- Tourism in Serbia
- Tourism in Slovakia
- Tourism in Ukraine

== Sources ==
- Blazovich, László (1994). "Kárpátok [Carpathians]". In Kristó, Gyula; Engel, Pál; Makk, Ferenc (eds.). Korai magyar történeti lexikon (9–14. század) [Encyclopedia of the Early Hungarian History (9th–14th centuries)] (in Hungarian). Akadémiai Kiadó. p. 332. ISBN 963-05-6722-9.
- Buza, Mircea (2011). "On the origins and historical evolution of toponymy on the territory of Romania" (PDF). Revue Roumaine de Géographie / Romanian Journal of Geography. 55 (1). Institute of Geography, Romanian Academy: 23–36. ISSN 1220-5311. Archived from the original (PDF) on 10 April 2018.
- Moldovanu, Dragoș (2010). "Toponimie de origine Romană în Transilvania și în sud-vestul Moldovei" (PDF). Anuar de Lingvistică și Istorie Literară (in Romanian). XLIX–L. Institute of Geography, Romanian Academy: 17–95. Archived from the original (PDF) on 5 March 2016.
