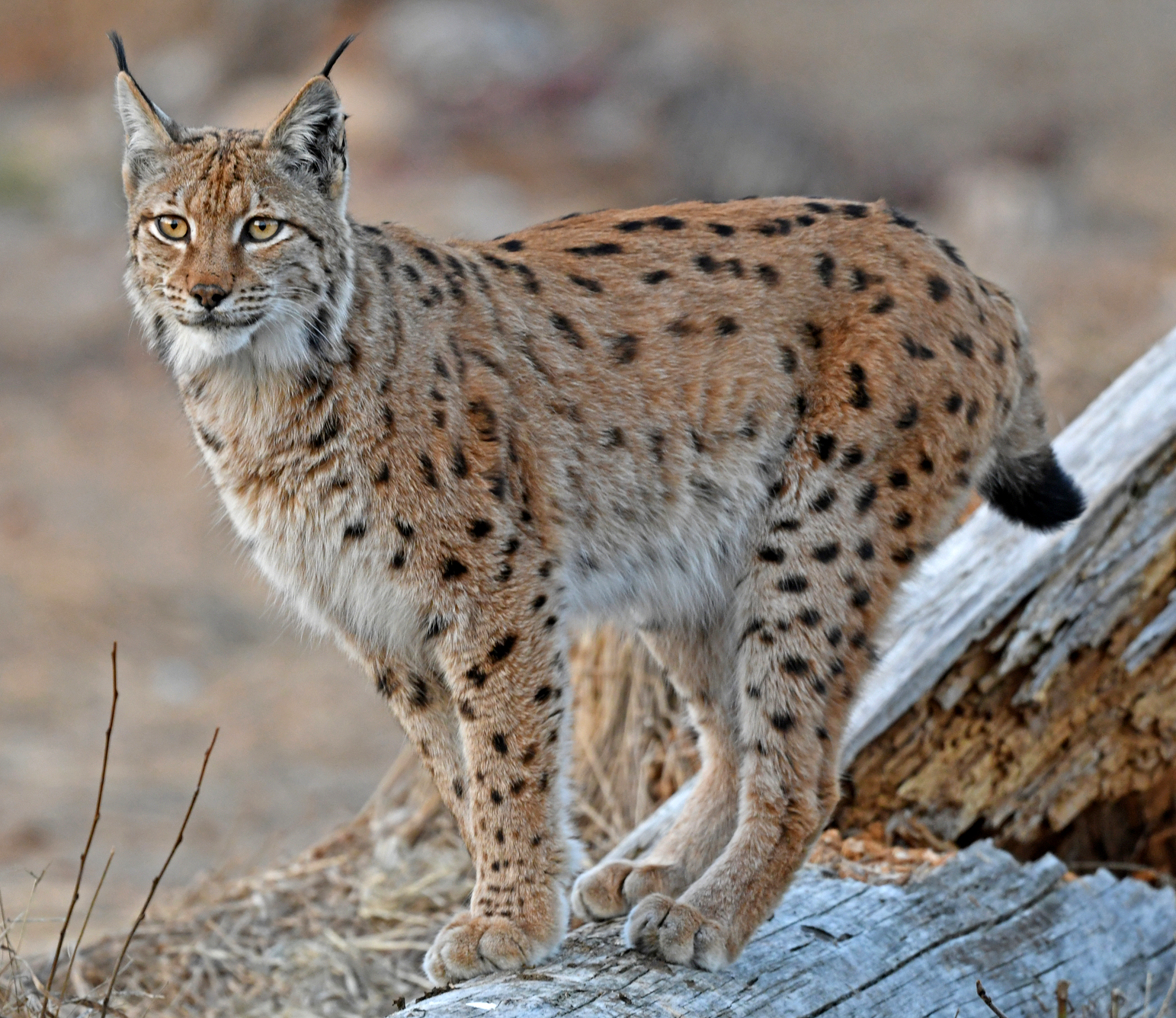
- Carpathian lynx in Bohemian Forest, Germany

Scientific classification
- Kingdom: Animalia
- Phylum: Chordata
- Class: Mammalia
- Order: Carnivora
- Family: Felidae
- Genus: Lynx
- Species: L. lynx
- Subspecies: L. l. carpathicus

Trinomial name
- Lynx lynx carpathicus (Kratochvil & Stollmann, 1963)

= Carpathian lynx =

Subspecies of carnivore

The Carpathian lynx (Lynx lynx carpathicus) is a subspecies of the Eurasian lynx found in the Carpathian Basin of Romania, Northern Italy, Slovakia, Hungary, Ukraine and Bulgaria.

== Description ==
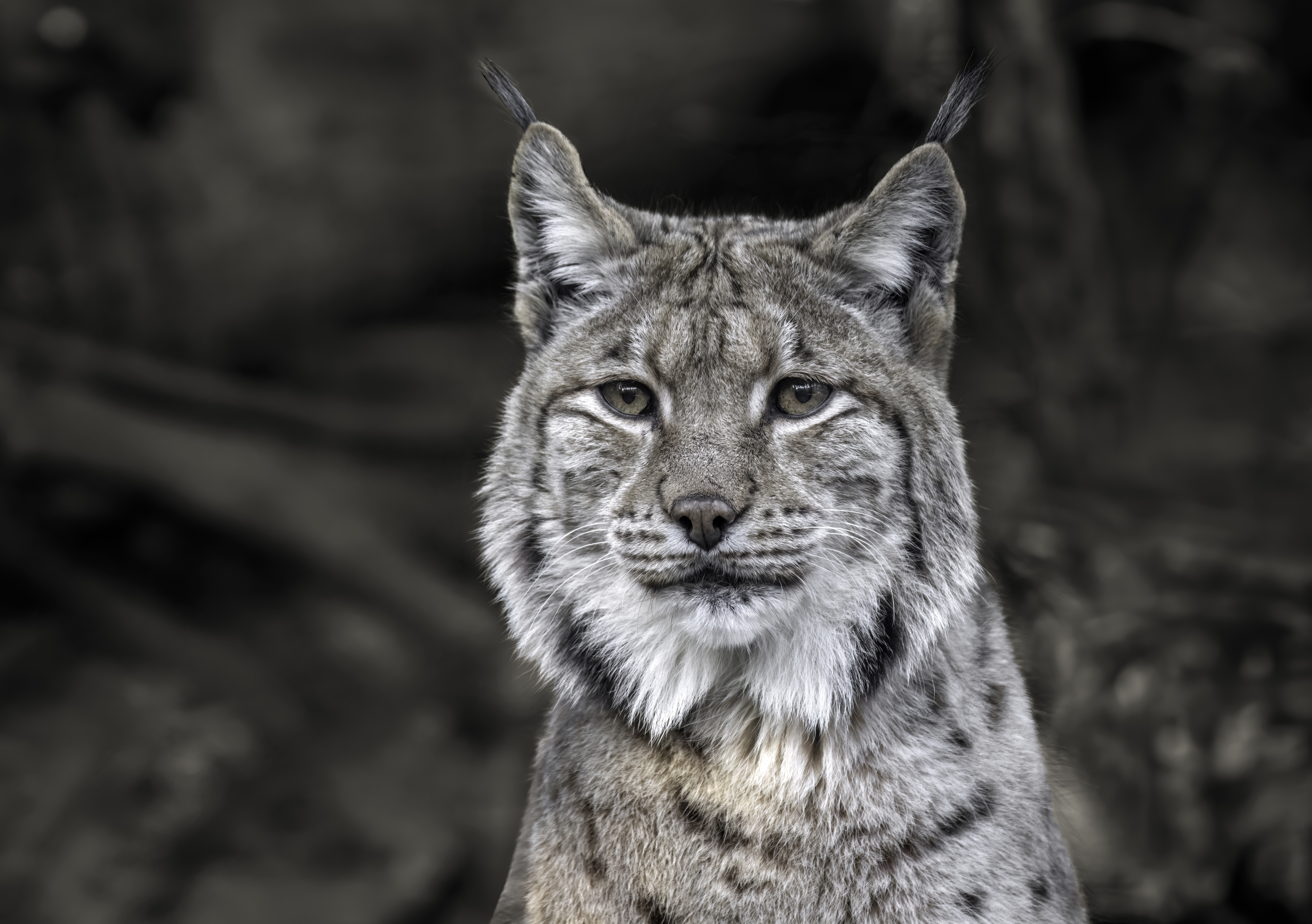
Carpathian lynx at the Alpenzoo,Innsbruck, Austria

The Carpathian lynx is quite large compared to other feline species. They have lengthy legs, large paws, bob tails, cheek hair forming a facial ruff, and tall ears with noticeable black tufts. Like other lynx subspecies, Carpathian lynxes have big, furry paws which hit the ground with a spreading toe movement, allowing them to walk above the snow. Their thick fur protects them from cold during winters. They have soft fur, which has denser amounts of spots than other lynx subspecies. Individual Carpathian lynxes have different patterns of spots, which allows researchers to identify them more easily on camera.

== Distribution and habitat ==
Carpathian lynxes can be found in Northern Italy and the Balkans, particularly in the Carpathian mountain ranges.

== Ecology and behavior ==
Carpathian lynxes are not fast runners compared to other feline species, and instead rely on ambush attacks to kill their prey. They are solitary creatures, avoiding humans and only coming together to breed.

=== Diet ===
Like other feline species, the Carpathian lynx is carnivorous and preys on deer, chamois, and sheep. In times of scarcity, they have been known to feed on smaller creatures, such as mountain hares, European rabbits, grouse, red foxes, and rodents. They hunt at night, and are not often spotted by humans for this reason.

=== Breeding ===
Carpathian lynxes have a gestation period of 63 to 74 days. Their litters have one to four kittens, who weigh 240 to 430 grams (8.5 to 15 oz) at birth and are born blind. The female lynx raises the kittens by herself, and the male does not play a part in their parenting. The kittens remain with their mother for 10 months.

== Conservation ==
L. l. carpathicus was once common throughout Europe, but is now extinct in some areas. In contrast to the expanding populations of many large carnivores in Europe, the Carpathian lynx population in the Western Carpathians appears unable to spread beyond the western boundaries of its current range, at the Czech–Slovak border. Persistent low density, high turnover of residents, and female philopatry may be responsible for hindering its range expansion, but stressors such as poaching and increasing landscape fragmentation in the Western Carpathians have exacerbated this issue. In addition, due to reintroduction in the 1970s, there is an endangered population in the territories of Croatia, Slovenia and Bosnia. Its main habitat, the Carpathian Mountains, are a popular eco-tourist destination. Illegal logging is widespread in the area as well, due to the existing laws not having enough funding to be enforced.
