= Ľadový štít =

Mountain in High Tatras, Slovakia

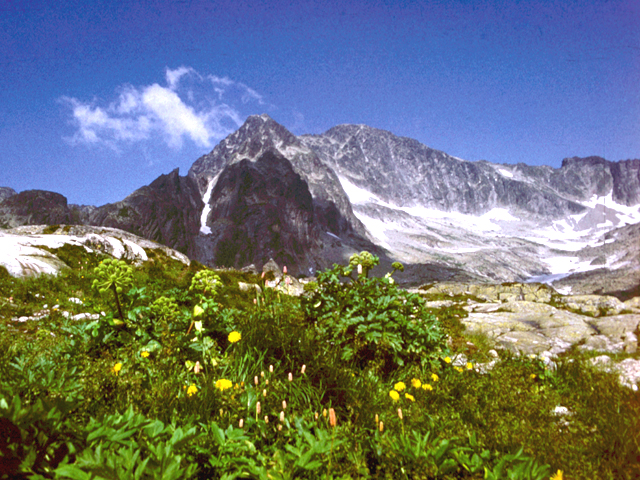

Highest point
- Elevation: 2,627.6 m (8,621 ft)
- Prominence: 274 m (899 ft)
- Coordinates: 49°11′56″N 20°10′56″E

Geography
- Location within Slovakia
- Location: Slovakia
- Parent range: Tatra Mountains

Ľadový štít (translated into English as Ice Peak; Hungarian: Jég-völgyi-csúcs, literally, Ice Valley Peak) is a mountain peak in the High Tatras, Slovakia. At an altitude of 2,627.6 metres (8,621 ft), it is the third highest of the Tatra Mountains, in Slovakia, and in the whole 1,500 km (930 mi) long Carpathian mountain chain, as well as in northern and eastern Central Europe.

== History ==
The first confirmed ascent was made by 1843 John Ball, Wilhelm Richter, Carl Ritter, a Polish philologist, a Hungarian landscape painter and three Polish mountain guides. In 1843, the first ascent was recorded, via Suchý žlab (Dry Couloir).

== Mountaineering ==
The most popular climbing routes:

Normal route. As first men on the top. Scale UIAA I.

Ľadový koň (Ice ridge). North ridge from Tery hut to Ľadová priehyba (Ice pass) and on the top. Scale UIAA II.

Grósz route. The left side of southeast wall. Scale UIAA III.

Brnčal pillar. The central southeast wall. Scale UIAA IV.
