= Popradské pleso =

Mountain lake in Slovakia

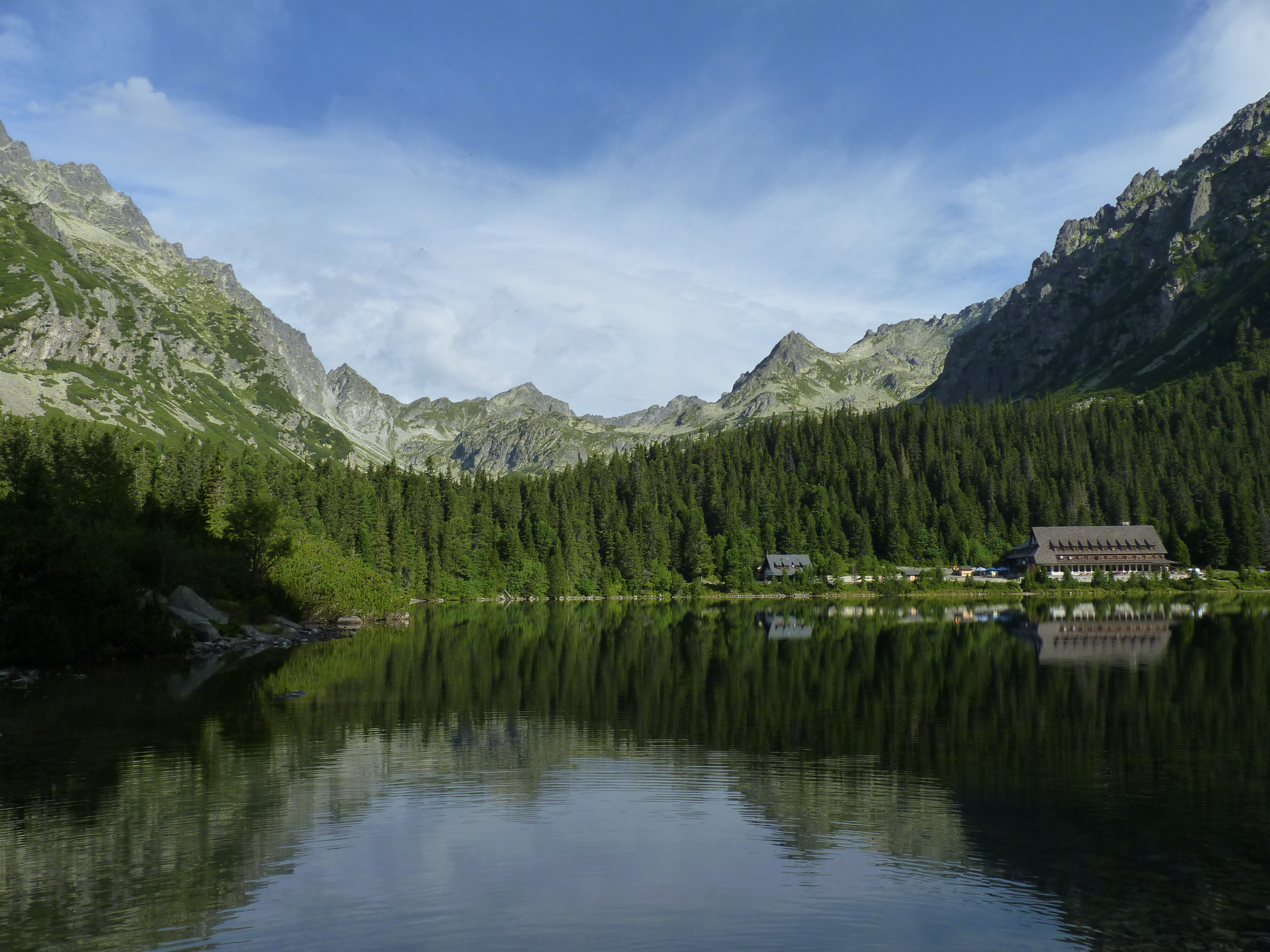

- Location within Slovakia
- Location: High Tatras, Slovakia
- Coordinates: 49.1531°N 20.0803°E
- Type: Moraine-dammed
- Primary inflows: Underground
- Surface elevation: 1,494 m (4,902 ft)

Popradské pleso (once called Rybie pleso) is a mountain lake of glacial origin located in the High Tatras, Slovakia. It is situated right on the Tatranská magistrála hiking path, at an altitude of 1,494 metres (4,902 ft).

Popradské pleso is one of the most visited spots in High Tatras and a starting point for many popular hikes including to Rysy and Kôprovský štít. Near to the lake, there is Symbolic Cemetery, built in a memory of the victims of the High Tatras.
