= Zielony Staw Gąsienicowy =

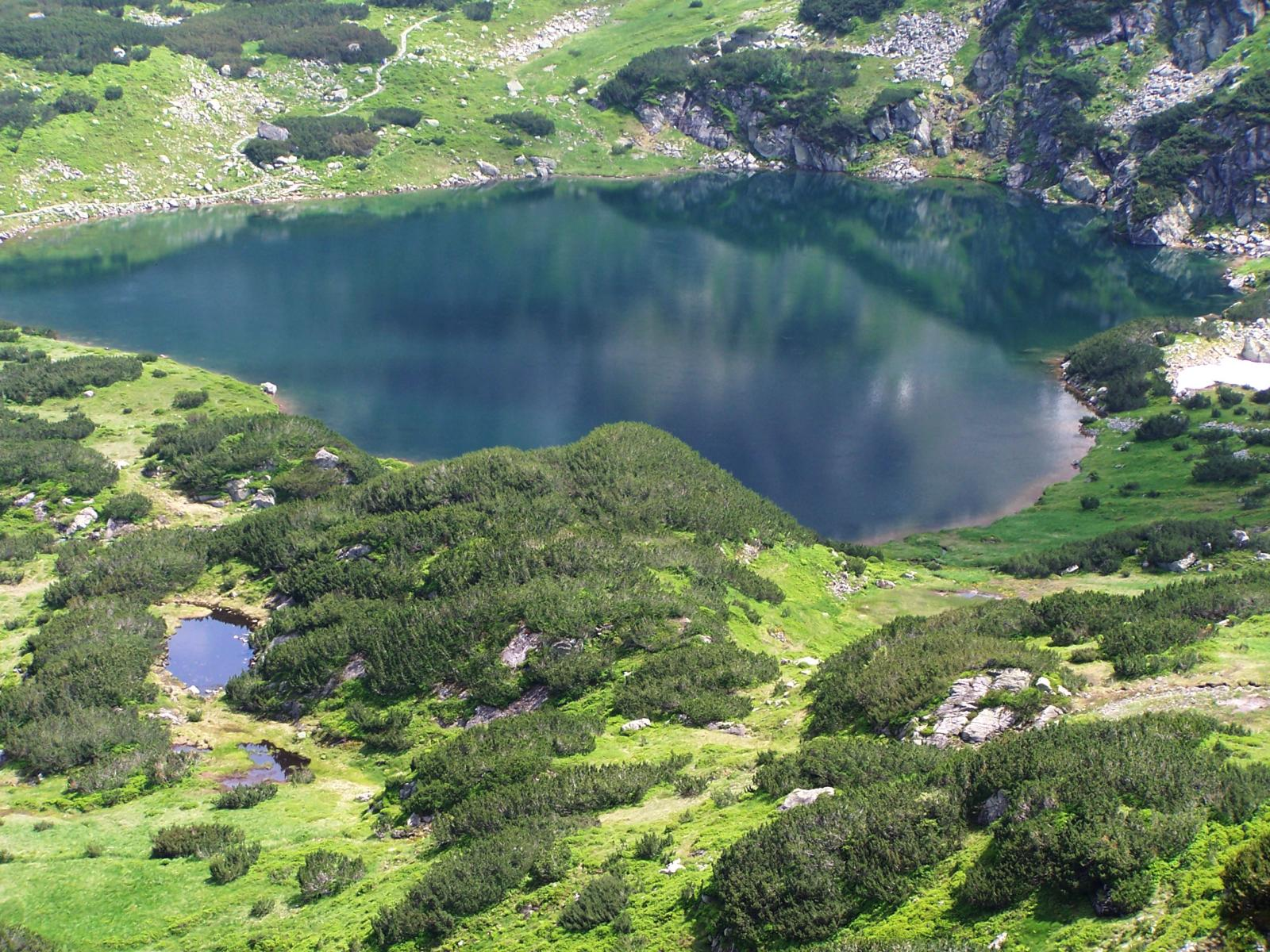
- Zielony Staw Gąsienicowy seen at the bottom of the Stawek Valley.

- Location within Poland
- Coordinates: 49°13′44″N 19°59′59″E
- Type: lake
- Basin countries: Poland
- Max. length: 0.275 km (0.171 mi)
- Max. width: 0.238 km (0.148 mi)
- Surface area: 38.4 ha (95 acres)
- Max. depth: 15.1 m (50 ft)
- Water volume: 260,500 m^{3} (211.2 acre⋅ft)
- Surface elevation: 1,672 m (5,486 ft)

Zielony Staw Gąsienicowy (Polish: Zielony Staw Gąsienicowy) is a tarn in Poland, part of the Gąsienicowe Ponds in the High Tatras. The lake is located at an elevation of 1,672 metres (5,486 ft) in a corrie of the Skrajna pyramidal peak. The tarn was formerly named Suczy Staw. Zielony Staw Gąsienicowy is the largest lake in the Zielona Gąsienicowa Valley.
