= High Tatras =

Mountain range along the border of Slovakia and Poland

- Vysoké Tatry; Tatry Wysokie
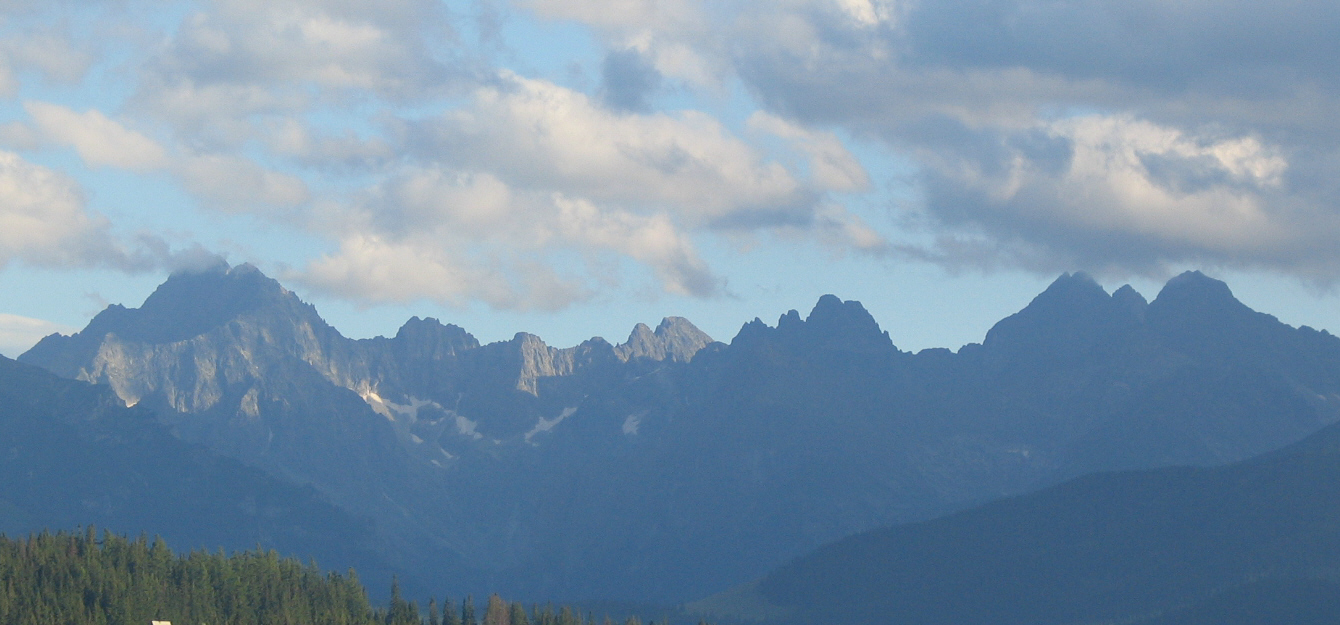
- Panorama of High Tatras. Peaks, from left to right: Gerlachovský štít, Batizovský štít, Kačací štít, Končistá, Gánok, Vysoká, and Rysy

Highest point
- Peak: Gerlachovský štít, Slovakia
- Elevation: 2,655 m (8,711 ft)
- Coordinates: 49°10′N 20°08′E

Geography
- Location within Slovakia Location within Poland
- Countries: Slovakia; Poland
- States: Prešov Region; Lesser Poland Voivodeship
- Regions: Tatra National Park—Tatranský národný park (Slovakia); Tatra National Park—Tatrzański Park Narodowy (Poland)
- Parent range: Eastern Tatras

The High Tatras or High Tatra Mountains (Slovak: Vysoké Tatry; Polish: Tatry Wysokie; Rusyn: Высокы Татры, Vŷsokŷ Tatrŷ; German: Hohe Tatra; Hungarian: Magas-Tátra), are a mountain range along the border of northern Slovakia in the Prešov Region, and southern Poland in the Lesser Poland Voivodeship. They are a range of the Tatra Mountains chain.

== Description ==
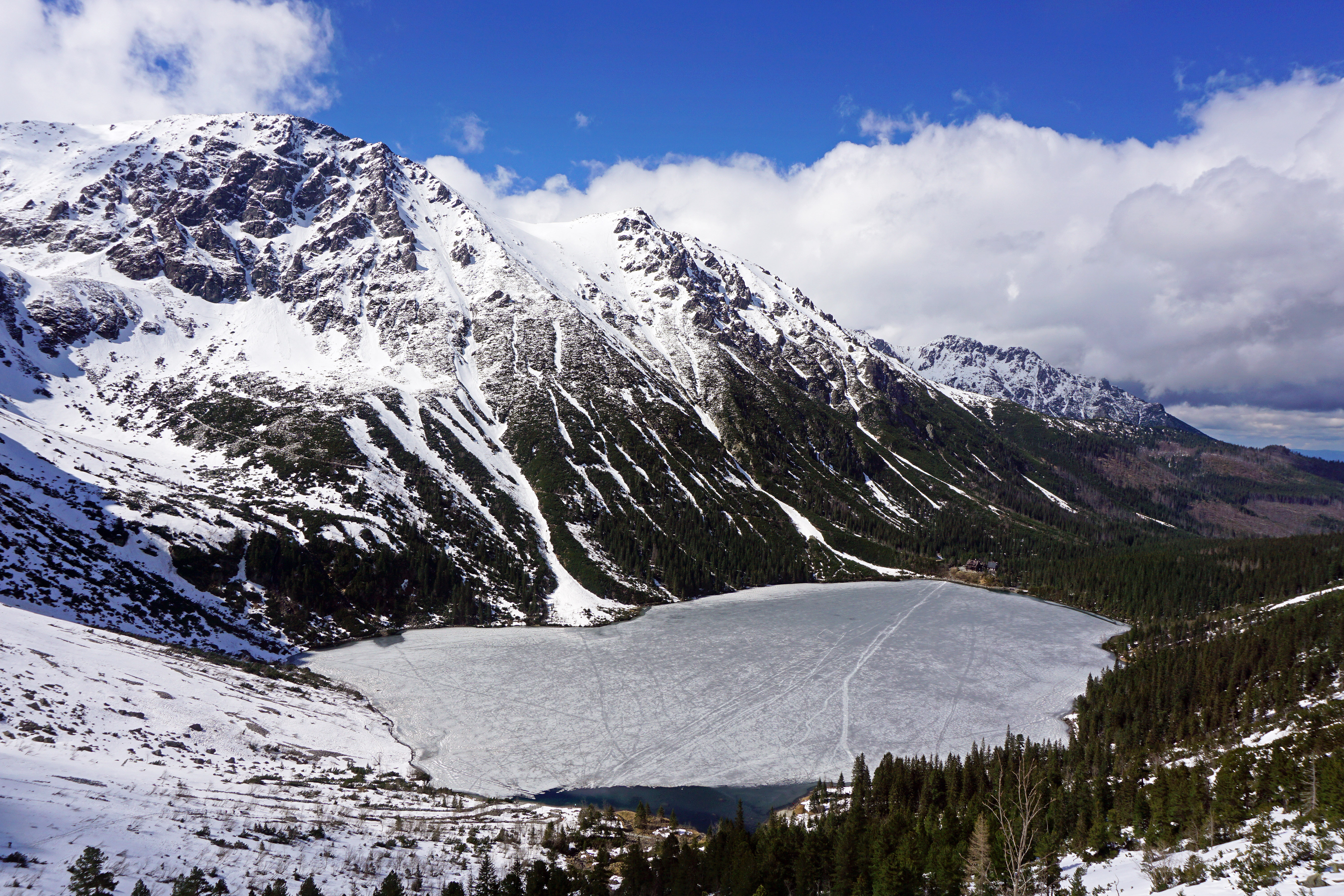
Morskie Oko ("Sea Eye"), the largest lake in the Tatra mountains, is found at an elevation of 1,395m and is surrounded by peaks that rise about 1,000m above it.

The mountain range borders the Belianske Tatras to the east, the Podtatranská kotlina to the south, and the Western Tatras to the west. Most of the range, and all the highest peaks, are in Slovakia. The highest peak is Gerlachovský štít, at 2,655 metres (8,711 ft).

=== Biogeography ===
The High Tatras, having 29 peaks over 2,500 metres (8,200 ft) AMSL are, with the Southern Carpathians, the only mountain ranges with an alpine character and habitats in the entire 1,200 kilometres (750 mi) length of the Carpathian Mountains system. The first European cross-border national park, Tatra National Park, was founded here with Tatra National Park (Tatranský národný park) in Slovakia in 1948, and Tatra National Park (Tatrzański Park Narodowy) in Poland in 1954. The contiguous parks protect UNESCO's trans-border Tatra biosphere reserve.

Fauna

Many rare and endemic animals and plant species are native to the High Tatras. They include the Tatras' endemic goat-antelope and critically endangered species, the Tatra chamois (Rupicapra rupicapra tatrica). Predators include Eurasian brown bear, Eurasian lynx, marten, wolf and fox. The Alpine marmot is common in the range.

Flora

Flora of the High Tatras includes: the endemic Tatra scurvy-grass (Cochlearia tatrae), yellow mountain saxifrage (Saxifraga aizoides), ground covering net-leaved willow (Salix reticulata), Norway spruce (Picea abies), Swiss pine (Pinus cembra), and European larch (Larix decidua).

== Peaks ==
=== Highest peaks ===
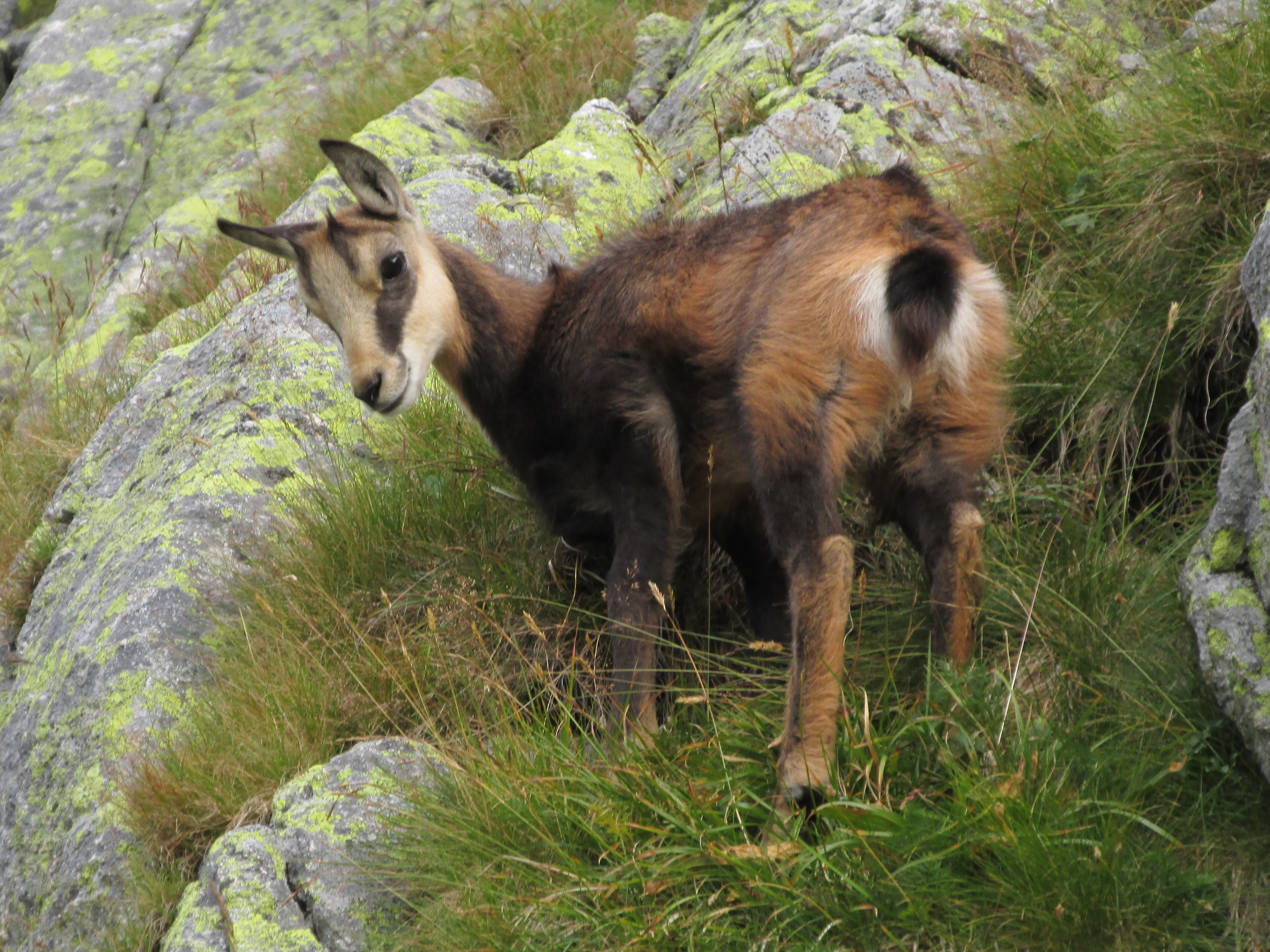
A young Tatra chamois

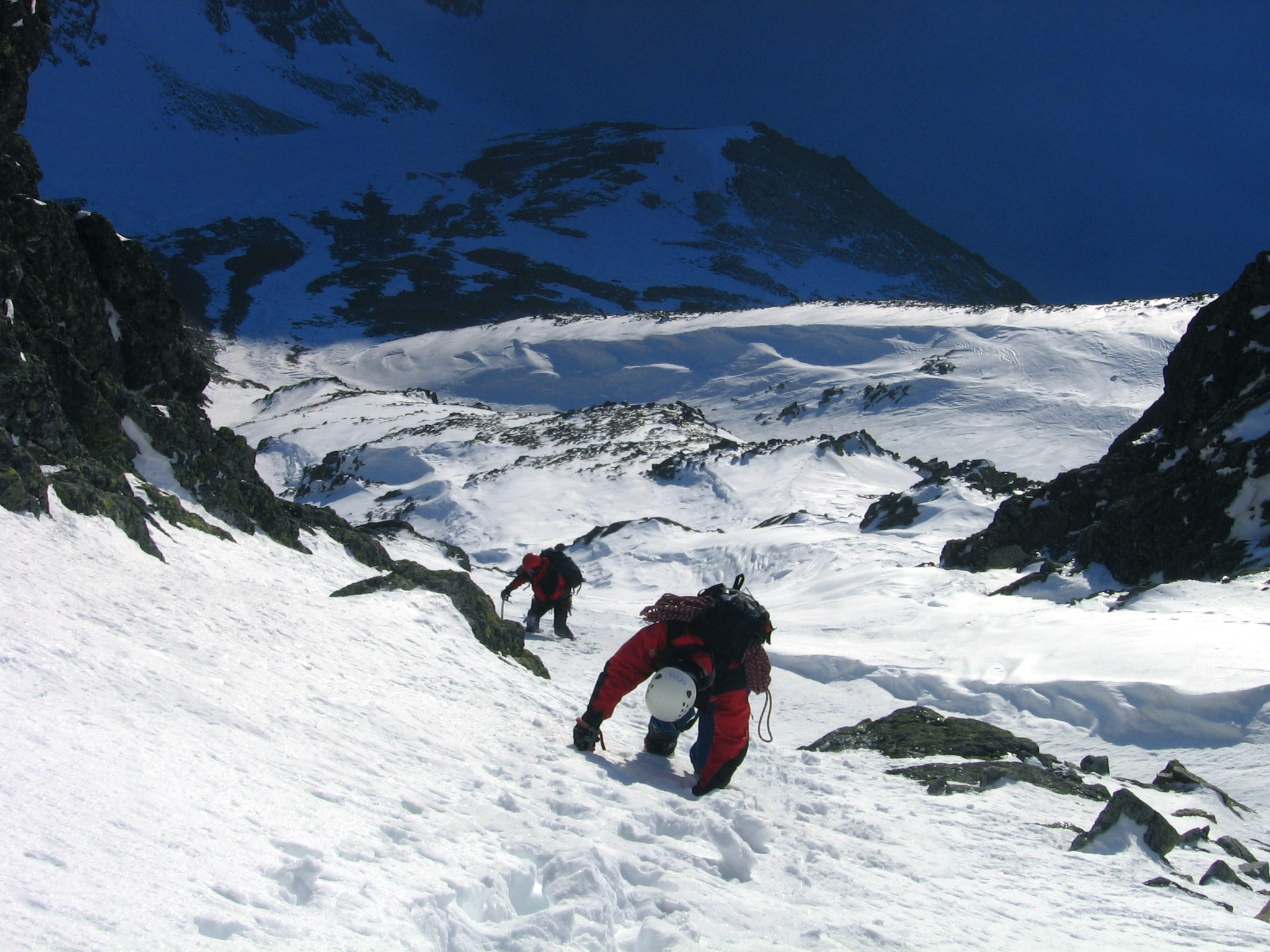
The alpine character of the High Tatras attracts mountaineers.

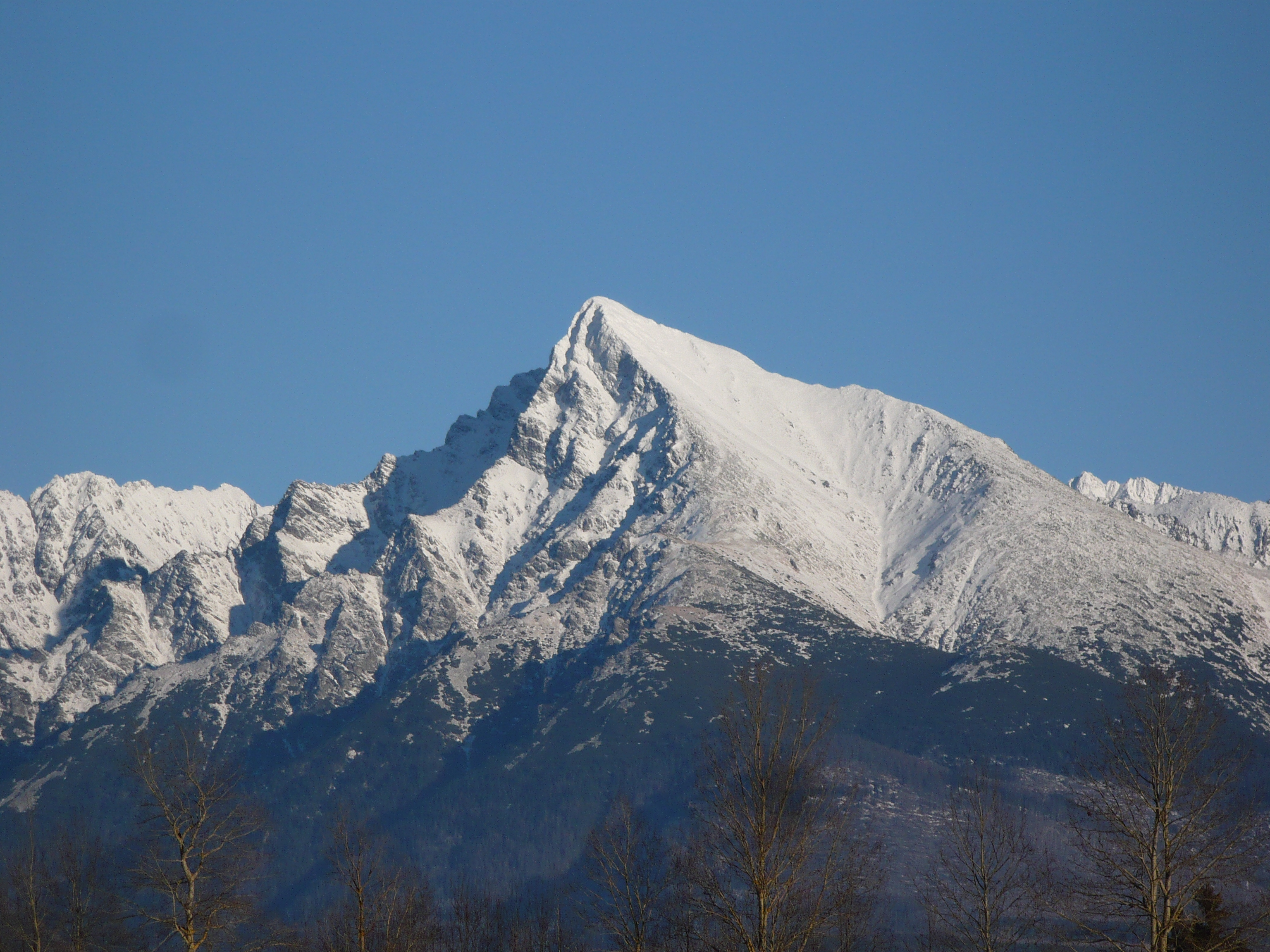
Kriváň (2,495 metres), considered to be the symbol of Slovakia

The 15 highest peaks of the High Tatras—all located in Slovakia—are:

Peak	Elevation (m|ft)	
Gerlachovský štít	around 2,655	8,711
Gerlachovská veža	2,642	8,668
Lomnický štít	2,634	8,638
Ľadový štít	2,627	8,619
Pyšný štít	2,623	8,605
Zadný Gerlach	2,616	8,583
Lavínový štít	2,606	8,550
Malý Ľadový štít	2,602	8,537
Kotlový štít	2,601	8,533
Lavínová veža	2,600	8,530
Malý Pyšný štít	2,591	8,501
Veľká Litvorová veža	2,581	8 468
Strapatá veža	2,565	8,415
Kežmarský štít	2,556	8,386
Vysoká	2,547	8,356

=== Other notable peaks ===
- Kriváň, 2494 meters, also called Slovakia's "most beautiful mountain"
- Rysy, the popular Polish−Slovak summit border crossing. Rysy has three peaks: the middle at 2,503 meters; the north-western at 2,499 meters; and the south-eastern at 2,473 meters. The north-western peak is the highest point of Poland.
- Slavkovský štít, 2452 meters tall, within the Tatra National Park, Slovakia

== Mountain lakes ==
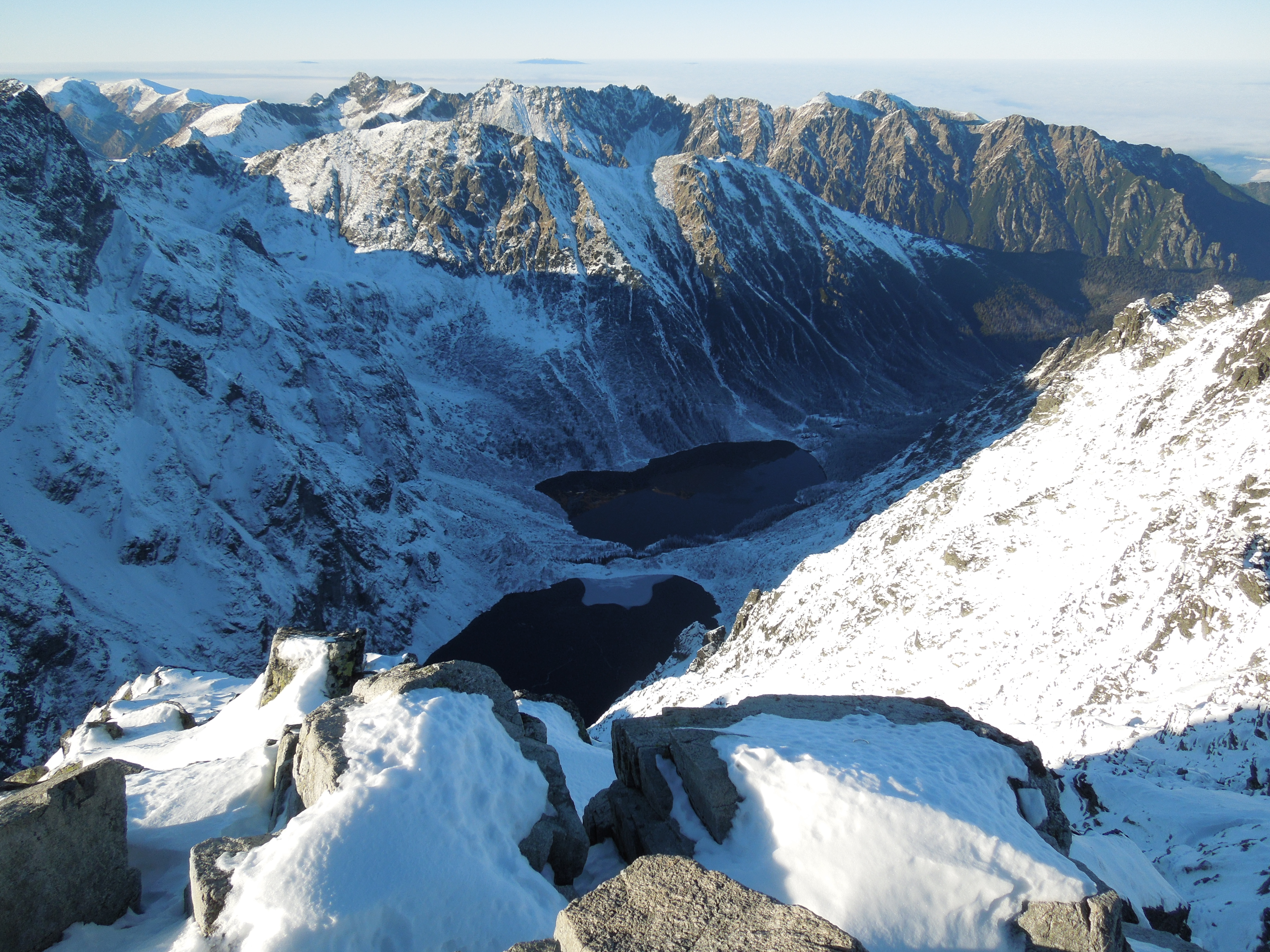
Mountain lakes of Czarny Staw pod Rysami and Morskie Oko seen from Rysy.

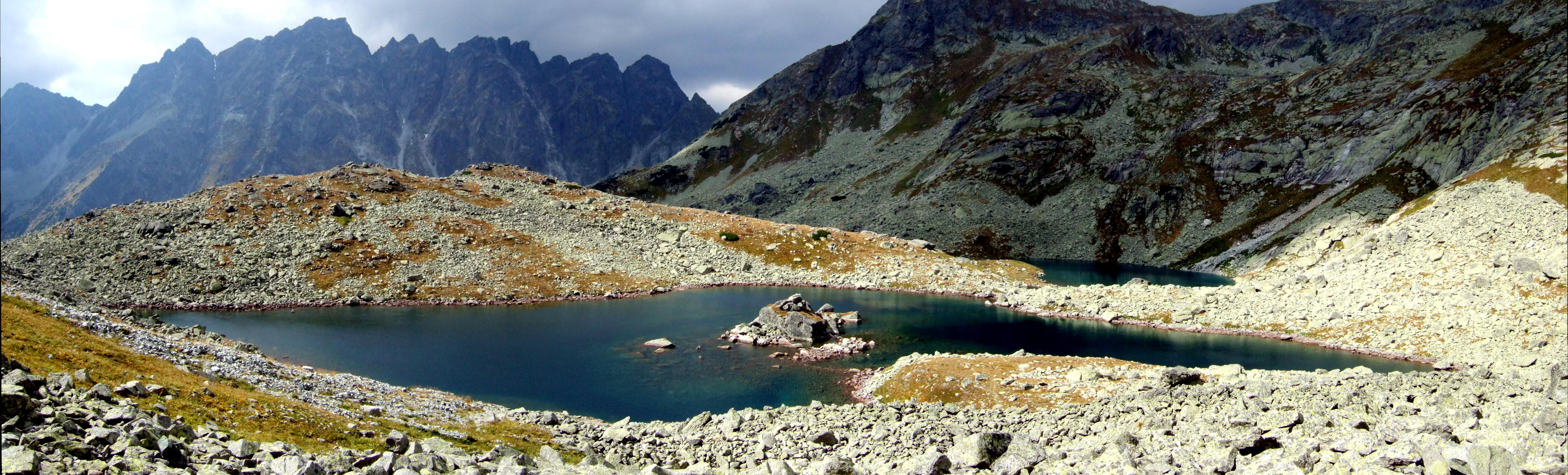
Veľké Žabie pleso (Mengusovské) lake in Žabia Valley

=== Major lakes ===
- Slovak lakes
  - Štrbské pleso - 1,347 m, 20 m deep.
  - Popradské pleso - 1,494 m, 17 m deep.
  - Veľké Hincovo pleso - 1,945 m, 54 m deep.
- Polish lakes
  - Morskie Oko - 1,395 m, 51 m deep.
  - Czarny Staw pod Rysami - 1,583 m, 76 m deep.
  - Wielki Staw Polski - 1,664 m, 79 m deep.

=== Other lakes ===
- Slovak lakes
  - Zmrzlé pleso
  - Ťažké pleso
  - Ľadové pleso
  - Batizovské pleso
  - Veľké Spišské pleso - 2,019 m, 10 m deep.
  - Veľké Žabie pleso (Mengusovské) - 1,921 m, 7 m deep.
  - Vyšné Bielovodské Žabie pleso - 1,699 m, 25 m deep.
  - Nižné Bielovodské Žabie pleso - 1,675 m, 21 m deep.
- Polish lakes
  - Kurtkowiec Lake - 1,686 m, 5 m deep.
  - Czarny Staw Gąsienicowy - 1,624 m, 51 m deep.
  - Zielony Staw Gąsienicowy - 1,672 m, 15 m deep.

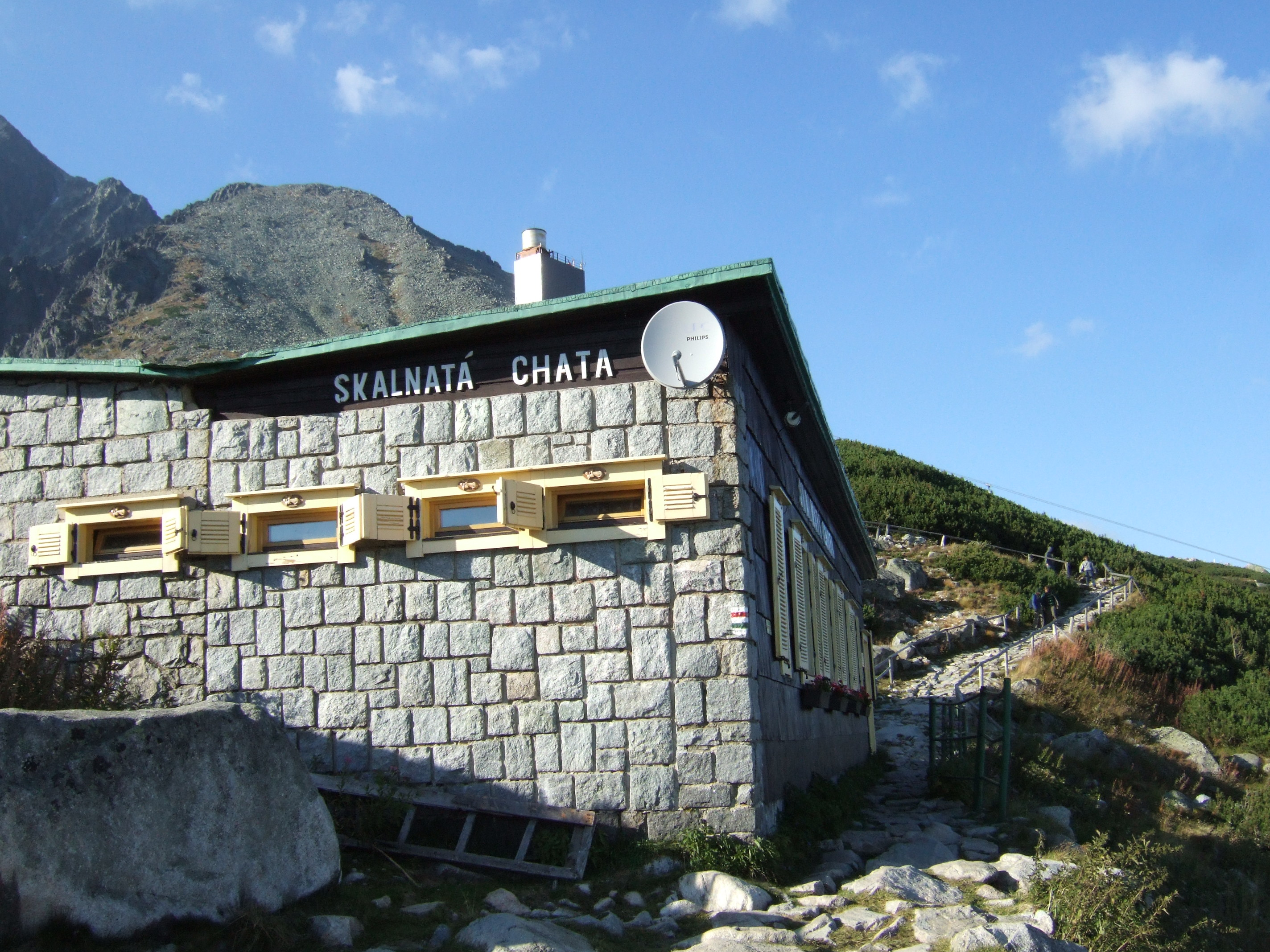
Mountain huts are common in the High Tatras, this one is halfway up Lomnický štít.

== Transport ==
- By TEŽ
  - Line 183: from: Štrbské Pleso - to: Poprad-Tatry
  - Line 184: from: Starý Smokovec - to: Tatranská Lomnica
- By OŽ
  - Line 182: from: Štrbské Pleso - to: Štrba
- By ŽSR
  - Line 185: from: Tatranská Lomnica - to: Studený Potok or from: Poprad-Tatry - to: Plaveč
- By PKP
  - Line 99 from: Chabówka to Zakopane

== Culture ==
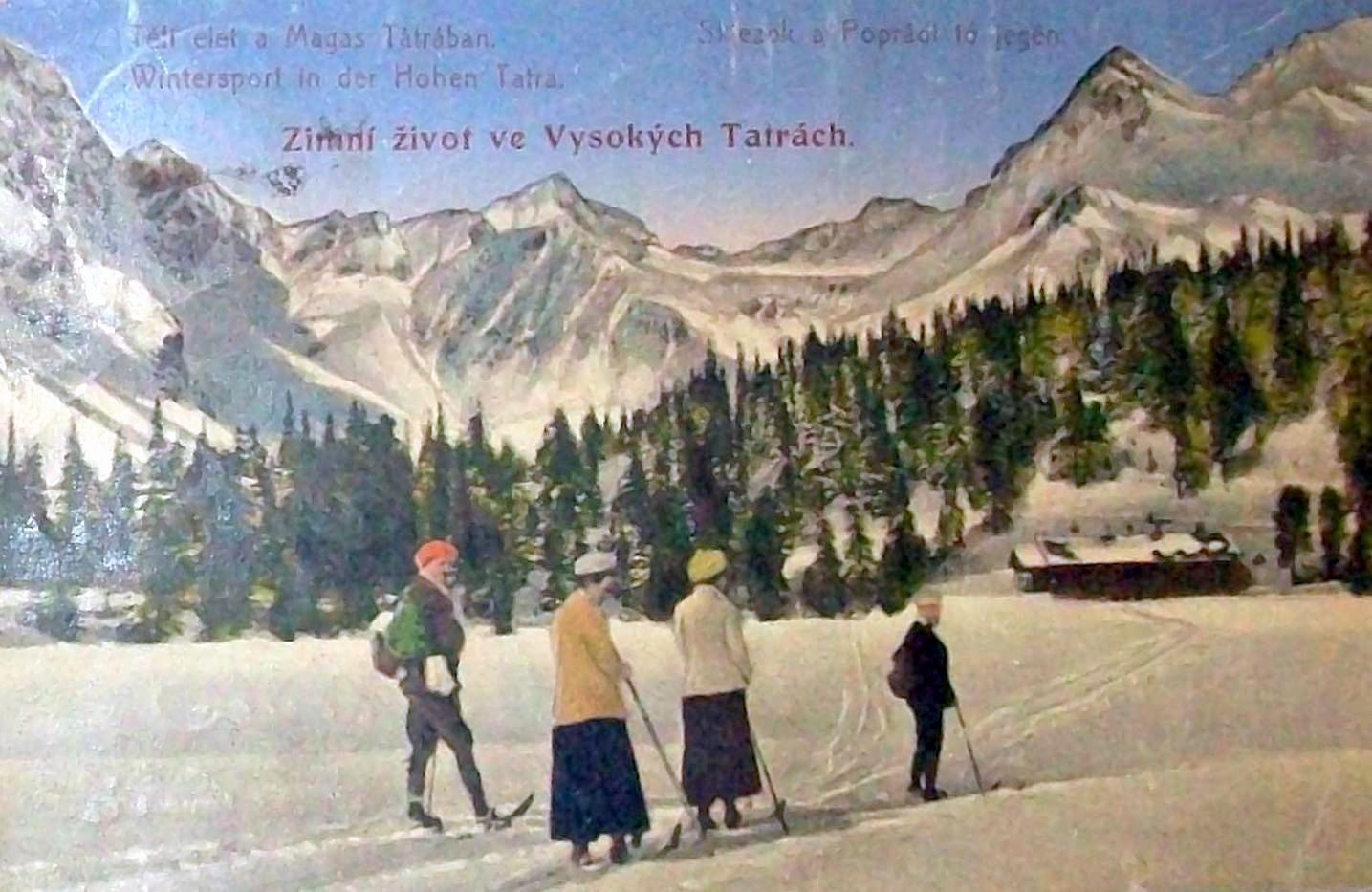
1922 postcard of tourists in the High Tatras.

The area is well known for winter sports. Ski resorts include Štrbské pleso, Starý Smokovec and Tatranská Lomnica in Slovakia, and Zakopane in Poland. The town of Poprad is the gateway to the Slovak Tatra resorts.

People

The Górale people ("highlanders"), a group of indigenous people with a distinctive traditional culture, are of the High Tatras and other mountain ranges and valleys in the Tatra Mountains region.

Ludwig Greiner identified Gerlachovský štít (Gerlachovský Peak) (2,665 metres (8,743 ft)) as the highest summit of the Tatra Mountains, and the entire Carpathian Mountains system. It is also the highest point of Slovakia.

Places and services

- Vysoké Tatry (town)
- Orla Perć — notable tourist mountain path/trail
- Siklawa Falls — highest waterfall in Poland
- Mickiewicz Falls
- Black Lake Falls
- Tatra Volunteer Search and Rescue (Poland)
- Mountain Rescue Service (Slovakia)

== See also ==
- Tatra National Park, Poland
- Tatra National Park, Slovakia
- Tourism in Poland
- Tourism in Slovakia
- 1989 Tatry - named after High Tatras
