= Gerlachovská veža =

Mountain in Slovakia

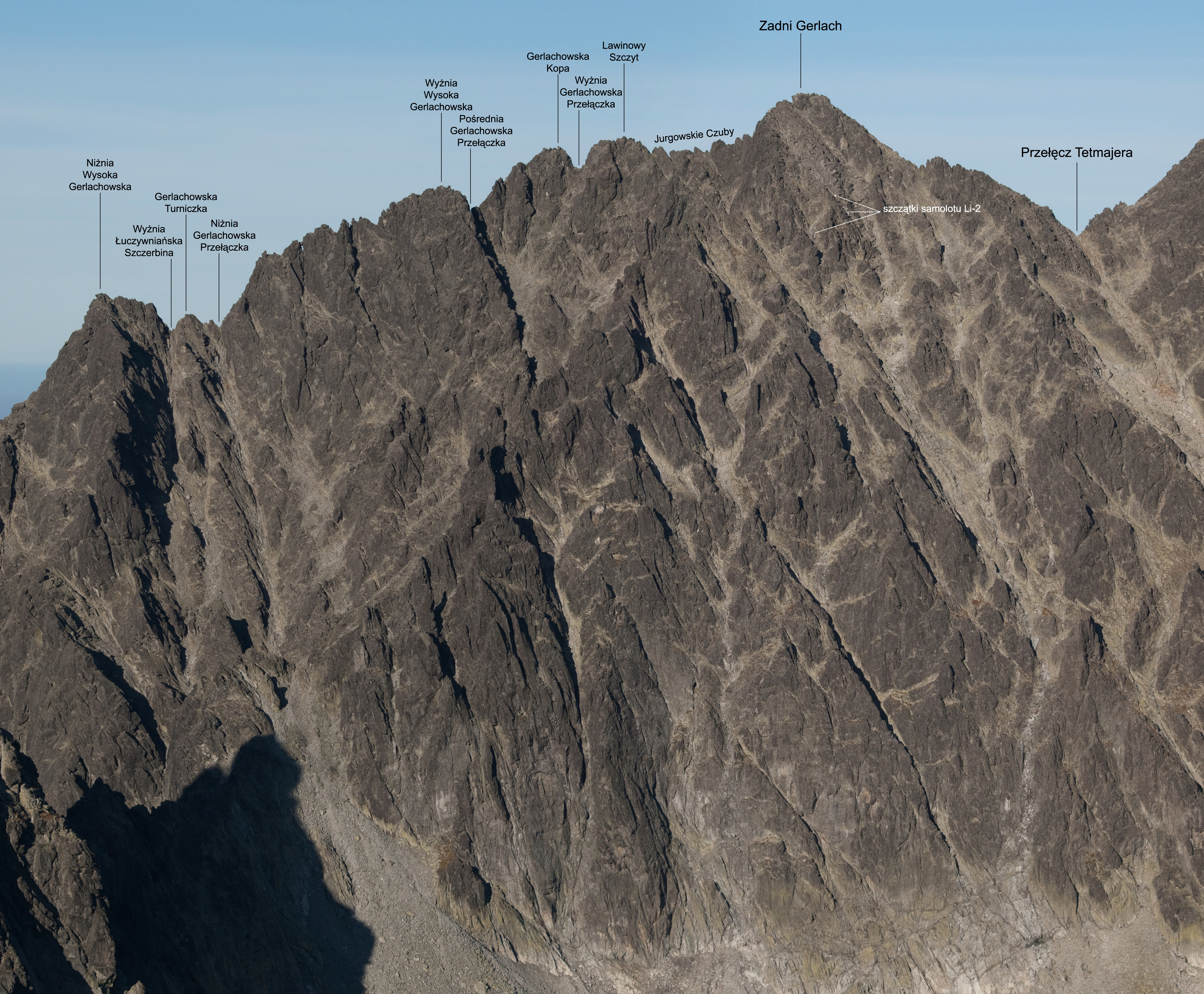
- Gerlachovská veža labelled as one of the peaks

Highest point
- Elevation: 2,642 m (8,668 ft)
- Coordinates: 49°10′08″N 20°07′49″E

Naming
- Language of name: Slovak

Geography
- Location within Slovakia
- Location: Poprad, Prešov, Slovakia
- Parent range: High Tatras

Climbing
- First ascent: 5 August 1905 by G. Horváth and Johann Hunsdorfer Senior
- Easiest route: Scramble

Gerlachovská veža is a mountain in the Northern ridge Zadni Gerlach in the main ridge of the Slovak High Tatras. From Veľká Litvorová veža it is separated by Nižná Gerlachovská lávka, and from the Malá Litvorová veža the mountain is bounded by Vyšná Lučivnianska lávka. At the top of the mountain there are no marked trails for tourists, only Taterniks are able to gain access to the top of the peak.

In the direction of the Velická Valley, the mountain falls to the ridge. Towards to the Kačacia Valley the mountain forms a spectacular rib shaped rock when joining the valley.
