= Illegal logging in Southeast and Eastern Europe =

Illegal logging in Southeast and Eastern Europe is destroying largely untouched forests in Romania, Bulgaria, in the Balkans and in Western Ukraine.

== Background and Development ==
During the transformation of Eastern Europe and parts of North Asia into free market economies space for illegal activities was created. On top of that, the Balkan Wars led to the collapse of national institutions and control authorities in many Balkan countries. Finally, low salaries for civil servants that were barely enough to meet everyday needs encouraged Corruption in many countries.

When adapting the national laws to the new market-economic conditions the contradictions inherent in the system became clear: engaging in forestry violated the nature protection laws. According to a 2008 analysis by the World Wildlife Fund (WWF), in some cases legal violations were unavoidable even when there was no criminal intent. The WWF demanded contradiction-free laws for forest management.

== Romania ==
During the transformation of Romania to a market economy many forested areas were returned to their private owners. Many private owners illegally clear-cut parts of their land holdings. Forested areas cover around 30 percent of Romania of which almost 10 percent are plantations. As a European Union member, the country is bound to the EU Timber Regulation which came into force in March 2013.

The chance of avoiding prosecution for illegal logging is at 90 percent according to a spokesman of WWF in Bukarest.

During a stocktaking by Romanian authorities in 2019, they estimated that every year 38 million cubic meters of timber are logged in the country – 20 million of those illegally. According to Greenpeace, no later than the year 2022 the monitoring of Romanian forests has improved because satellite images were used for monitoring. In the preceding years several foresters had been murdered in Romania. In September 2022 criminal prosecutors cracked down on illegal logging, money laundering, embezzlement and tax evasion across the country. From 2020 to 2022 the legal export of green biomass from Romania doubled.

== Initiatives and NGOs ==
The "Organized Crime and Corruption Reporting Project" (OCCRP) is an network of institutions and journalists that investigate in the Caucasus, Central Asia and Central America. The network investigated extensive facts around the topic which led to a documentary. The undercover investigations for "Clear Cut Crimes" of 2016 show the entanglements between Romanian politicians and the Austrian timber merchant HS Timber Group and their CEO Gerald Schweighofer with the mafia-like structures of the illegal timber trade. The film also shows the local citizen's militia "The Cossacks" in Western Ukraine which resists illegal logging.
