= Tatra National Park, Poland =

National park in Poland

Tatra National Park
- Tatrzański Park Narodowy (TPN)
- IUCN category II (national park)
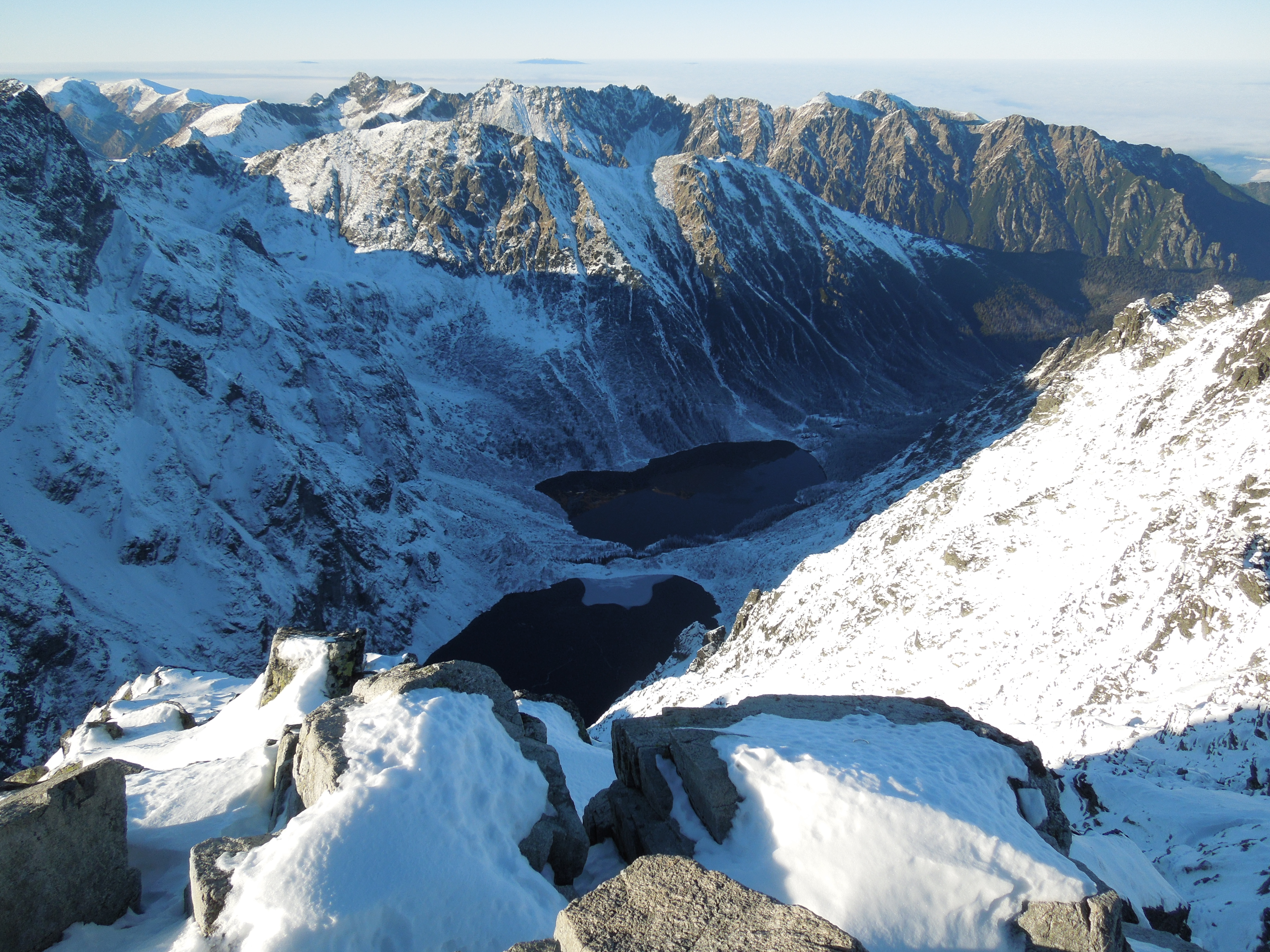
- Mountain lakes of Czarny Staw pod Rysami and Morskie Oko seen from Poland's highest point, the north-western summit of Rysy, 2,499 metres (8,199 ft) in elevation. Park logo with the Tatra chamois

- Location within Lesser Poland Voivodeship Location within Poland
- Location: Tatra Mountains, southern Poland
- Nearest city: Zakopane
- Coordinates: 49°14′39″N 19°57′20″E
- Area: 211.64 km^{2} (81.71 sq mi)(81.71 mi^{2})
- Established: 1954
- Governing body: Ministry of the Environment
- Website: Official website

Ramsar Wetland
- Official name: Glacial lakes in the Tatra National Park
- Designated: 11 December 2017
- Reference no.: 2340

Ramsar Wetland
- Official name: Peat bogs in the Tatra National Park
- Designated: 11 December 2017
- Reference no.: 2341

Tatra National Park (Polish: Tatrzański Park Narodowy; abbr. TPN) is a national park located in the Tatra Mountains in Tatra County, in the Lesser Poland Voivodeship in central-southern Poland. The park is headquartered in the town of Zakopane.

The Tatra Mountains form a natural border between Poland to the north and Slovakia to the south, and the two countries have cooperated since the early 20th century on efforts to protect the area. Slovakia created an adjoining national park, and UNESCO later designated the area a transboundary biosphere reserve.

In the TPN, in the accessible areas, you can practice hiking, scrambling, climbing, ice climbing, and skiing.

== Park history ==
The first calls for protection of the Tatras came at the end of the 19th century. In 1925, the first efforts to create a national park, in cooperation with Czechoslovakia, took place. The park was formally created in 1937, on an area that belonged to the state forest authority. In 1947, a separate administrative unit, Tatra Park, was created.

In 1954, by decision of the Polish Government, Tatra National Park was created. It was established originally over an area of 215.56 km^{2} (83.23 sq mi), but it is currently slightly smaller, at 211.64 km^{2} (81.71 sq mi). Of this, 151.91 km^{2} (58.65 sq mi) is forest and the remainder mainly meadows. Strictly protected zones account for 115.14 km^{2} (44.46 sq mi), of which 61.49 km^{2} (23.74 sq mi) are forest ecosystems.

In 1992, the Polish and Slovak national parks in the Tatras were jointly designated a transboundary biosphere reserve by UNESCO, under its Man and the Biosphere Programme.

== Geography ==
Mountains

The National Park covers one of the two Alpine mountain ranges in Poland. The Polish Tatra range, which is a part of the Western Carpathian Mountains, is divided into two sections: the High Tatras (Tatry Wysokie) and the Western Tatras (Tatry Zachodnie). The landscape consists of sharp-edged peaks and hollows with numerous rock formations. The highest peak in Poland, Rysy (2,499 metres (8,199 ft) AMSL), is located here.

Caves

There are around 650 caves in the park, of which the Wielka Śnieżna cave system is the longest (23.7 kilometres (14.7 mi)), and the deepest (maximum depth 808 metres (2,651 ft)). Six caves of this system are open to public.

Water

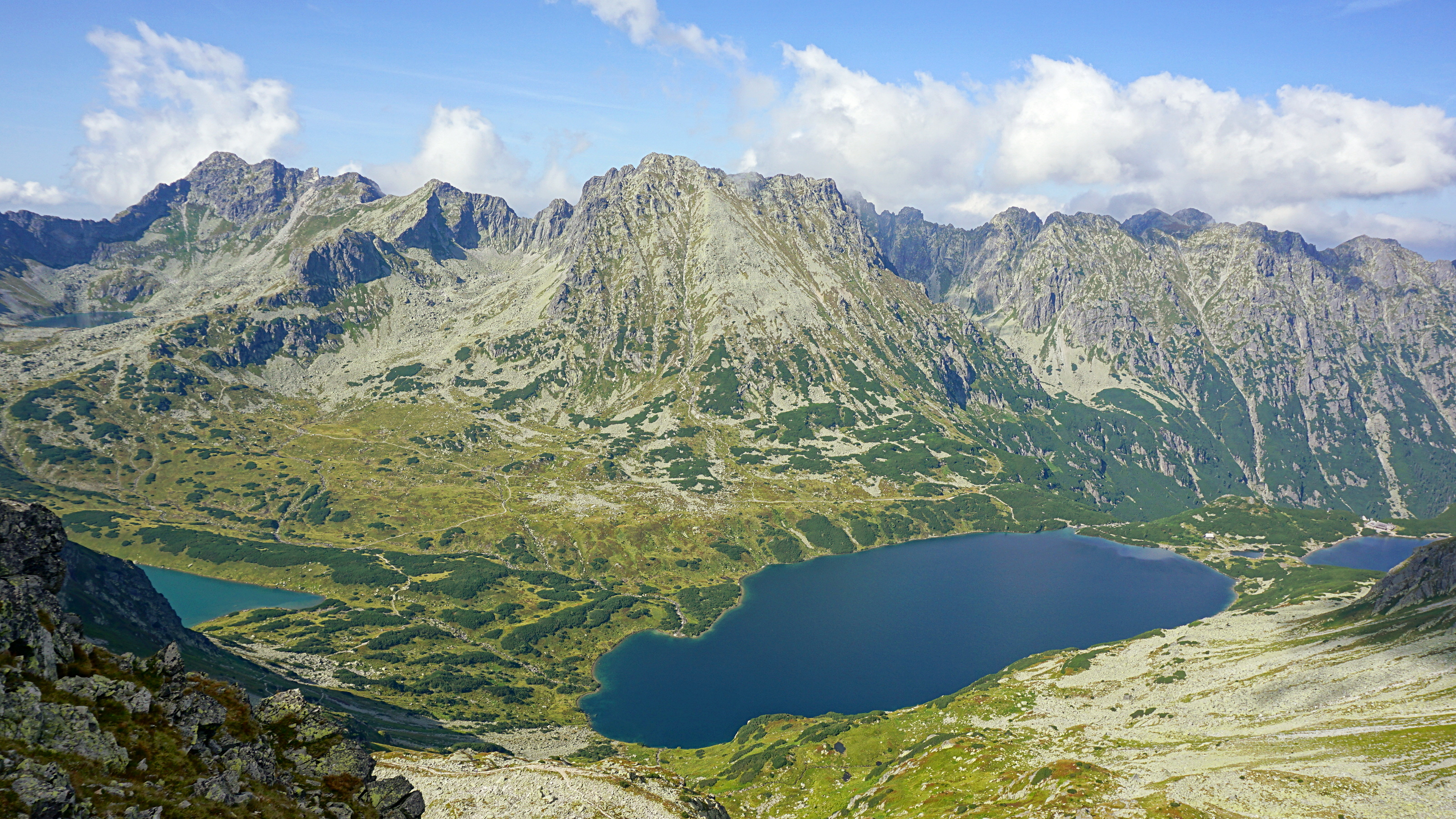
Wielki Staw Polski in the Polish Tatras

There are several streams, the longest stream reaching 20 kilometres (12 mi). Waterfalls, such as Mickiewicz Falls, are popular with tourists. The highest waterfall is Siklawa Falls at 70 metres (230 ft) followed by Black Lake Falls 40 metres (130 ft) and Siklawica Falls 24 metres (79 ft).

The park has over 30 mountain lakes, called staw (Polish: pond). These water bodies are an important part of the High Tatra landscape. The largest lakes are: Morskie Oko with an area of 349,000 m^{2} and maximum depth of 50.8 metres (167 ft)); and Wielki Staw Polski with an area of 344,000 m^{2} and maximum depth of 79.3 metres (260 ft)).

== Biology and ecology ==
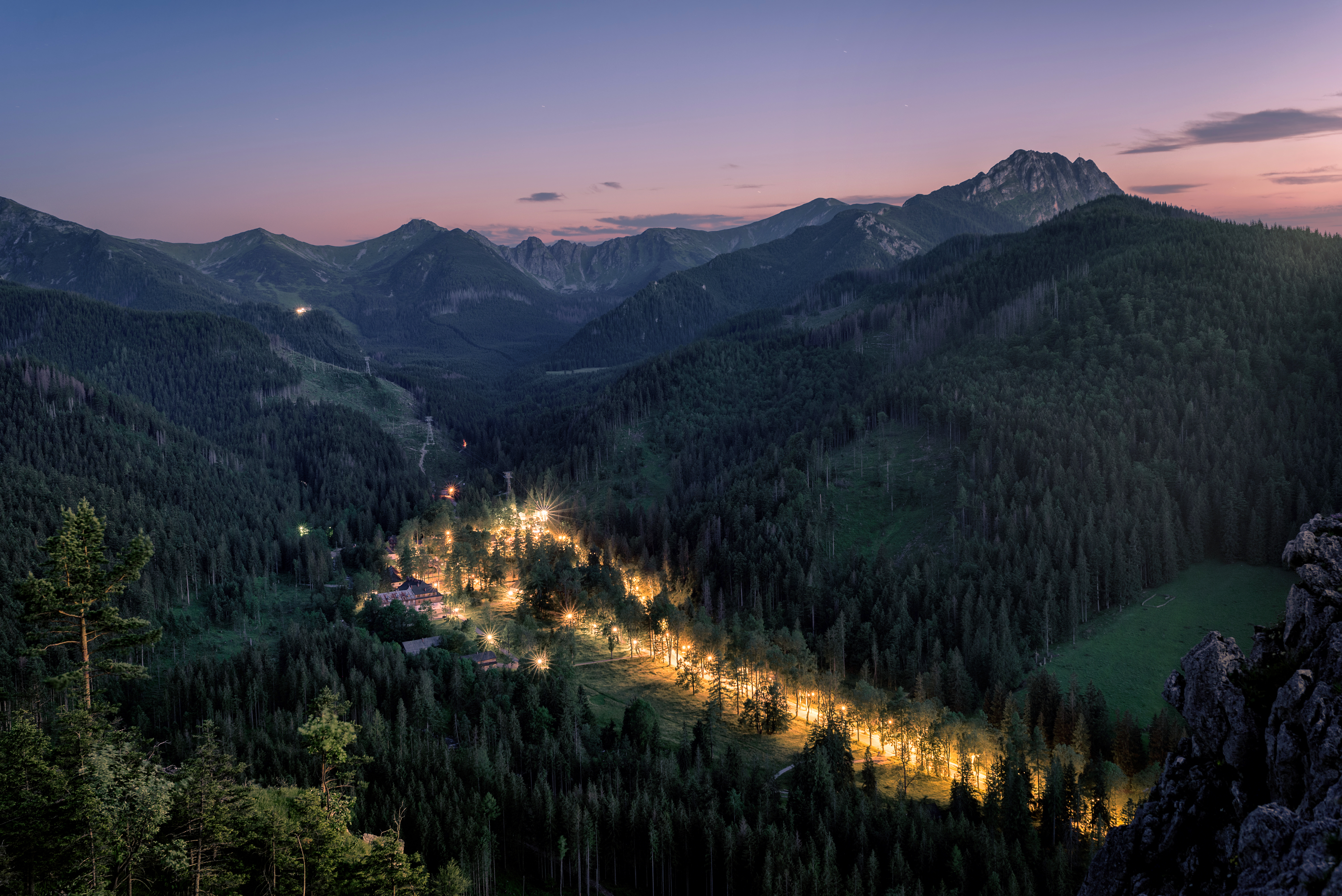
Tatra National Park

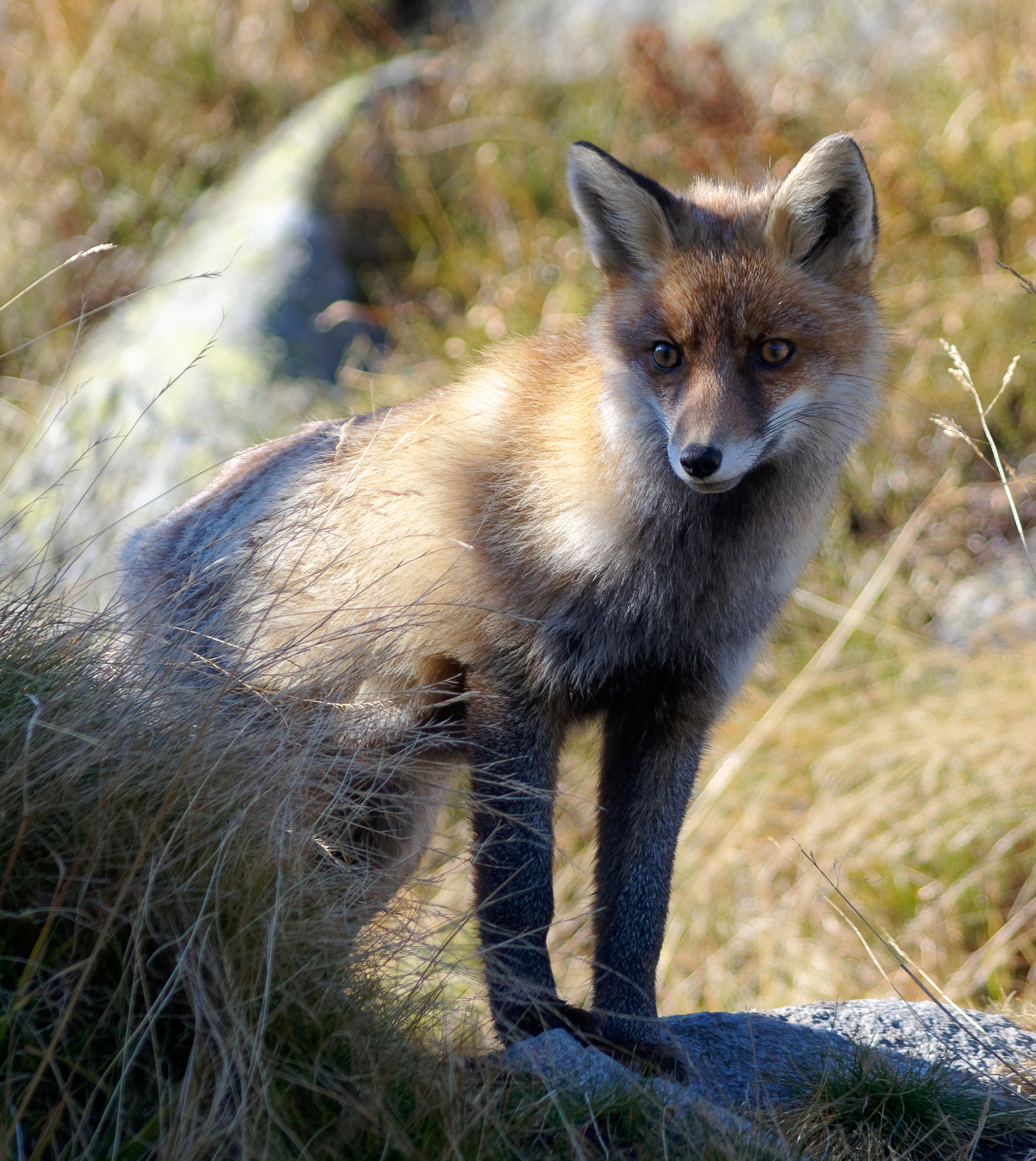
Red Fox in the park

=== Flora ===
Up to 1,250 metres (4,100 ft) there are mainly silver fir (Abies alba) and European beech (Fagus sylvatica) forests. Higher levels, up to 1,550 metres (5,090 ft), are covered with European spruce (Picea abies) forests, which turn into meadows and grasslands at higher elevations up to 1,800 metres (5,900 ft). The highest elevations, above 1,800 metres (5,900 ft), have alpine flora habitats.

Other typical species include Swiss pine (Pinus cembra), edelweiss (Leontopodium alpinum), and stemless carline thistle (Carlina acaulis). Spring in the Kościeliska Valley is notable for the fields of giant crocus (Crocus vernus, syn: Crocus scepusiensis).

=== Fauna ===
The National Park contains several endemic fauna species, and many endangered and protected ones. Animals include: the Tatra chamois and Tatra marmot, protected since the mid-19th century; Eurasian brown bear, Carpathian lynx, Eurasian wolf, Eurasian otter and the lesser spotted eagle.

== Culture ==
=== The Górale ===
The Podhale region of the Tatras is home to the Górales or the Goral (highland) people. Distinctive elements of their culture include the Podhale dialect (language), music, and traditional artisan customs such as clothes, wooden vernacular architecture, cheesemaking, and craft works. The historic Górale culture was traditionally passed on in oral stories.

=== Environment ===
The area of the Tatra Mountains was exploited by human activities in the past. During summer, domestic animals such as goats, sheep, and cows were pastured on the meadows, which contributed to soil erosion. In the 18th and 19th centuries, several mines and ironworks were built here, industries that used substantial harvests of local timber.

Current environmental threats include: the proximity of the fast-developing town of Zakopane; and air pollution from the industrial zones in Kraków, Ostrava, and Orava. Fauna is threatened by poachers and habitat loss.

The high number of tourists is the largest threat to the park's ecosystem currently. Also, the infrastructure, such as hotels and car parks, is not sufficient for the current volume of visitors.

=== Tourism ===
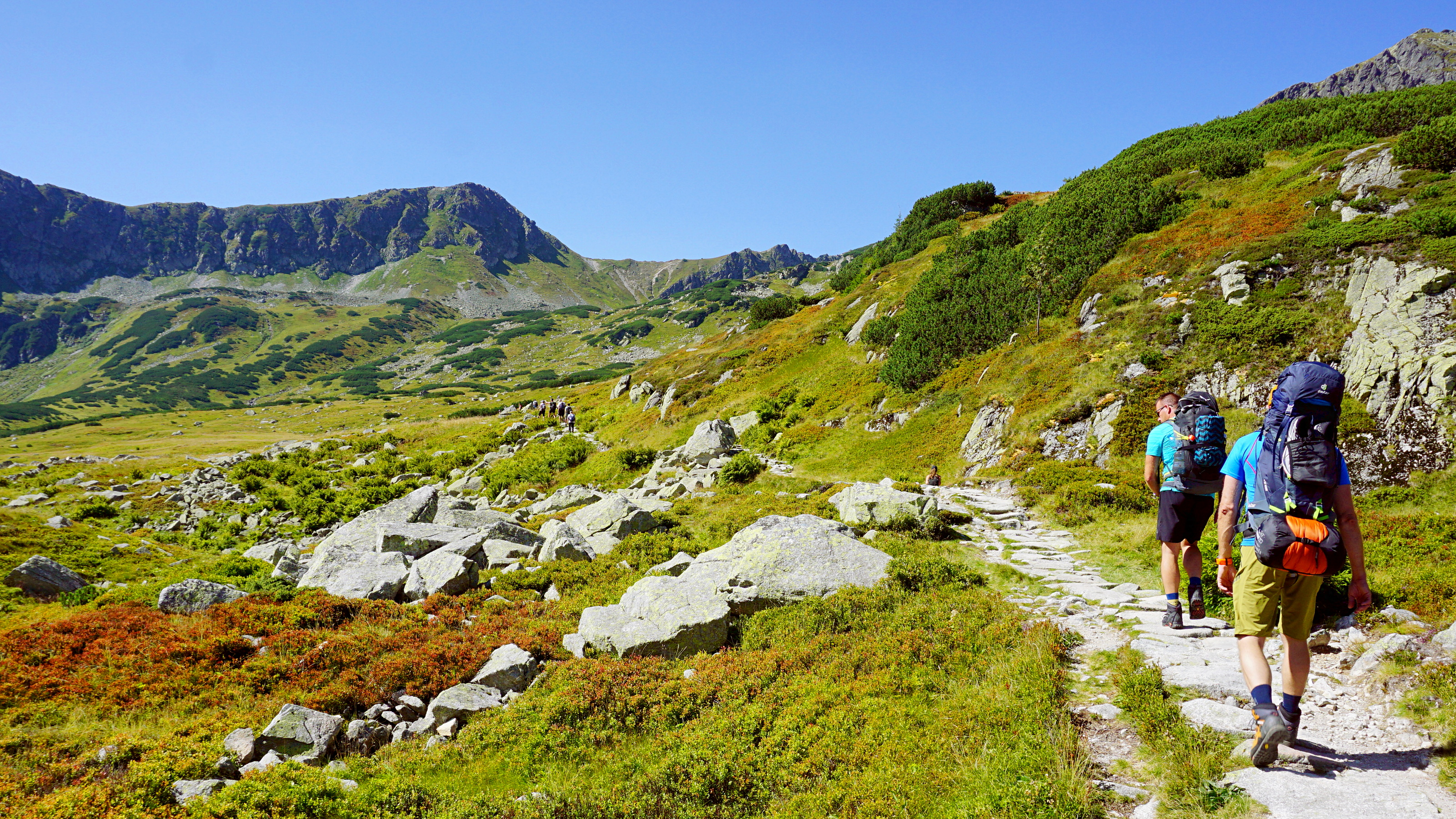
Hiking in the High Tatras

Tourism was first developed in the Tatras in the late 19th century, and continues in the 21st. It is the most visited national park in Poland.

There are more than 270 kilometres (170 mi) of hiking trails in Tatra National Park.

== Gallery ==
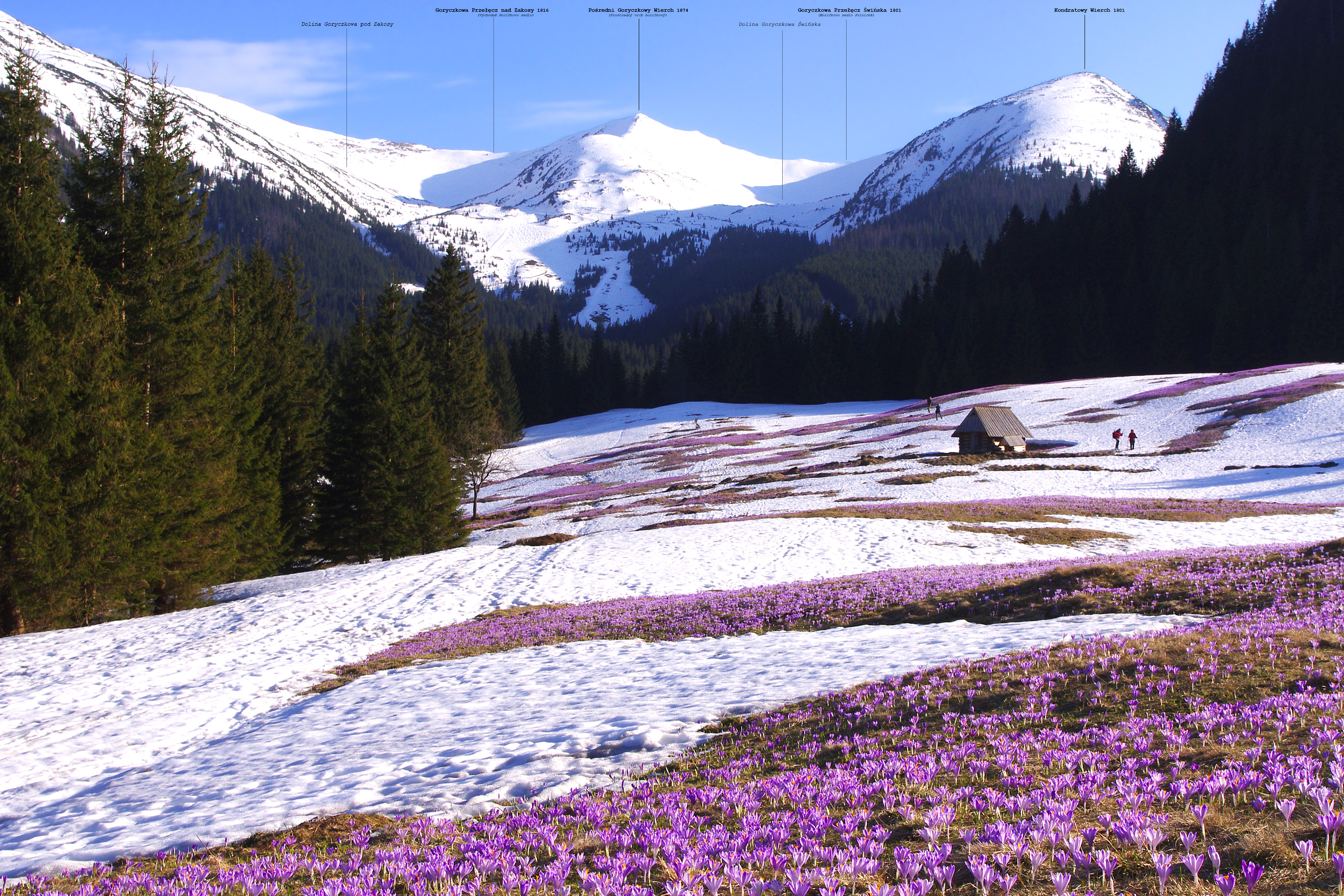
A field of crocuses in the Goryczkowa Valley, Western Tatras

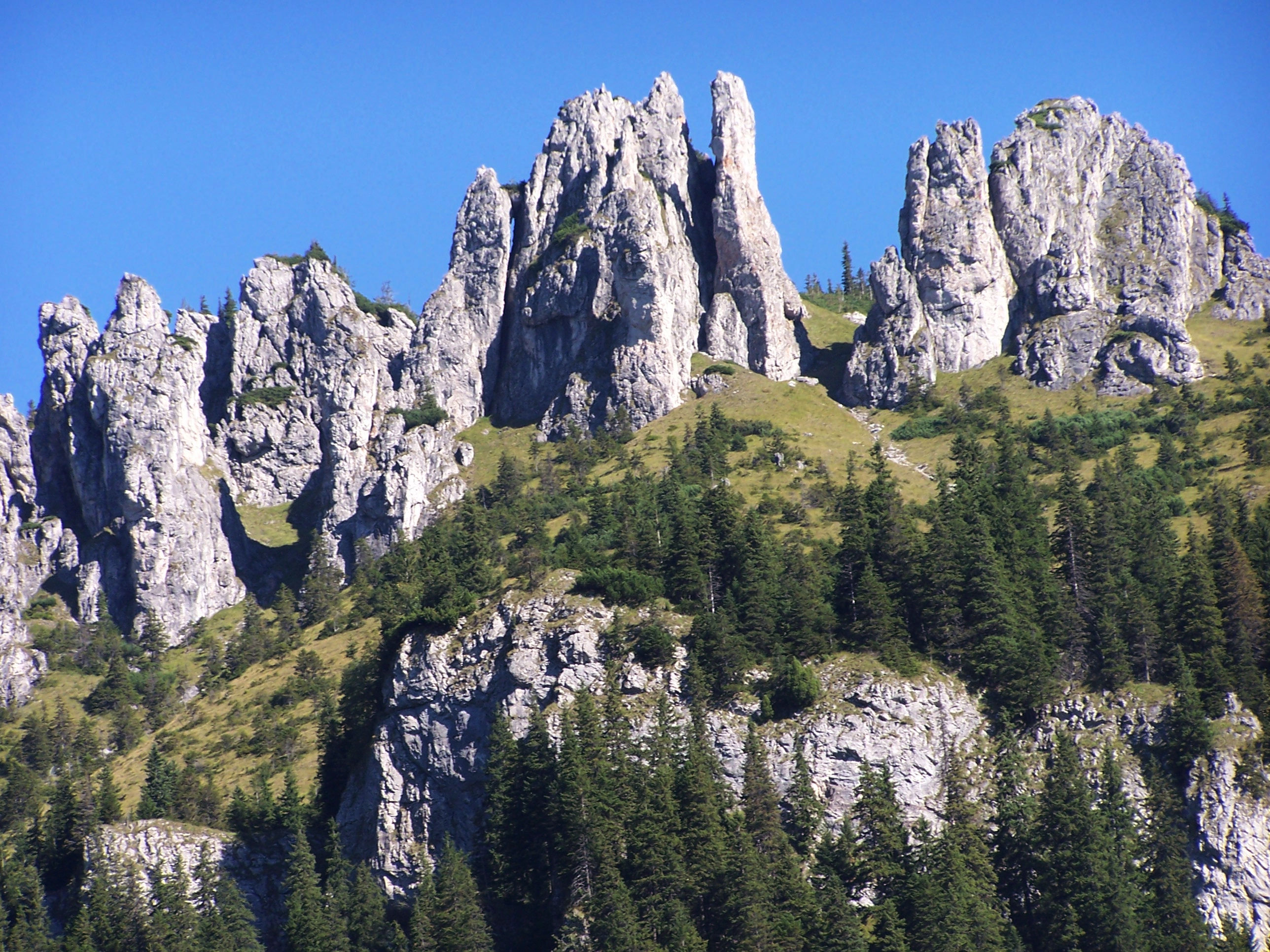
Mnichy Chochołowskie

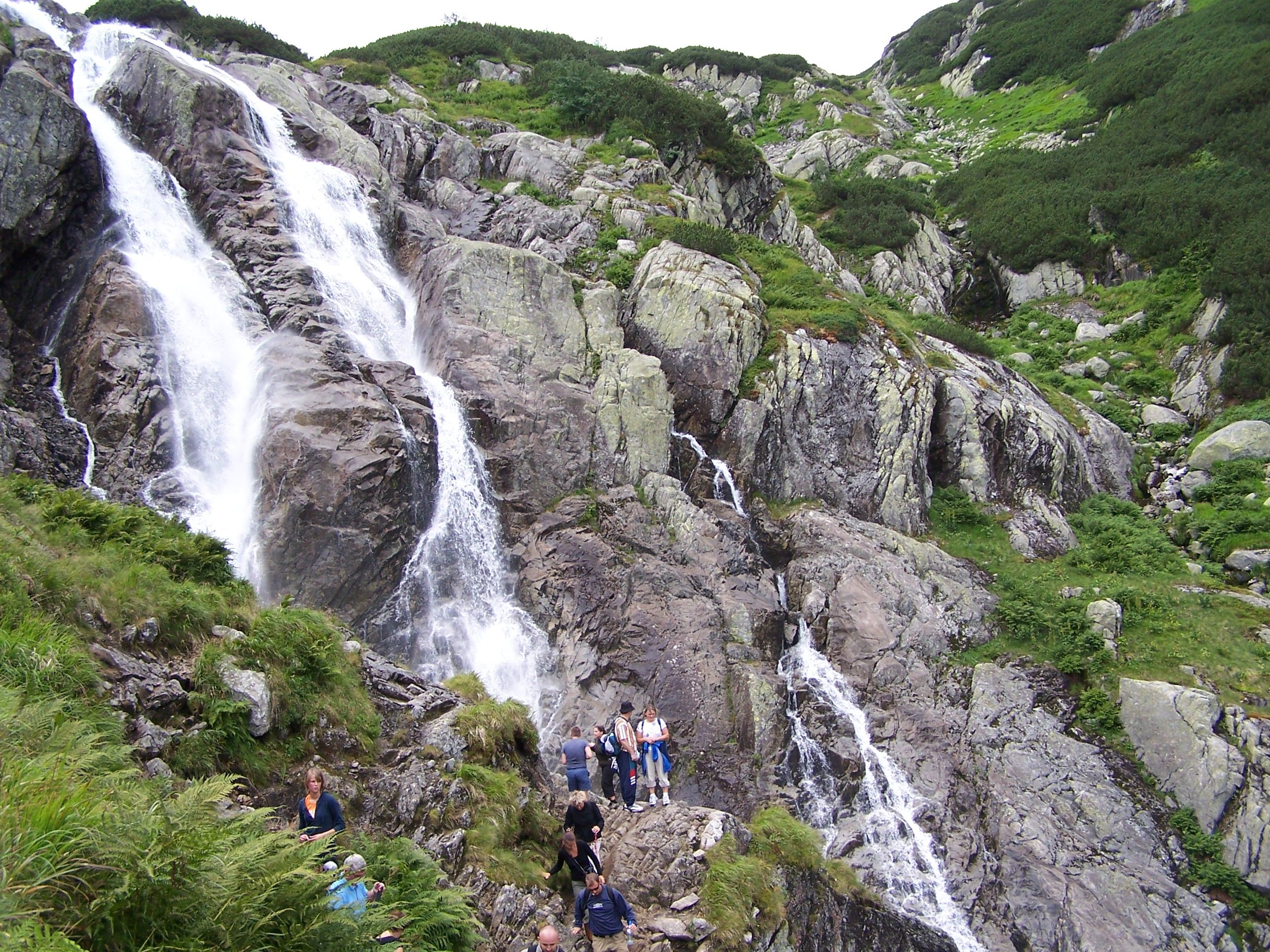
Siklawa Falls

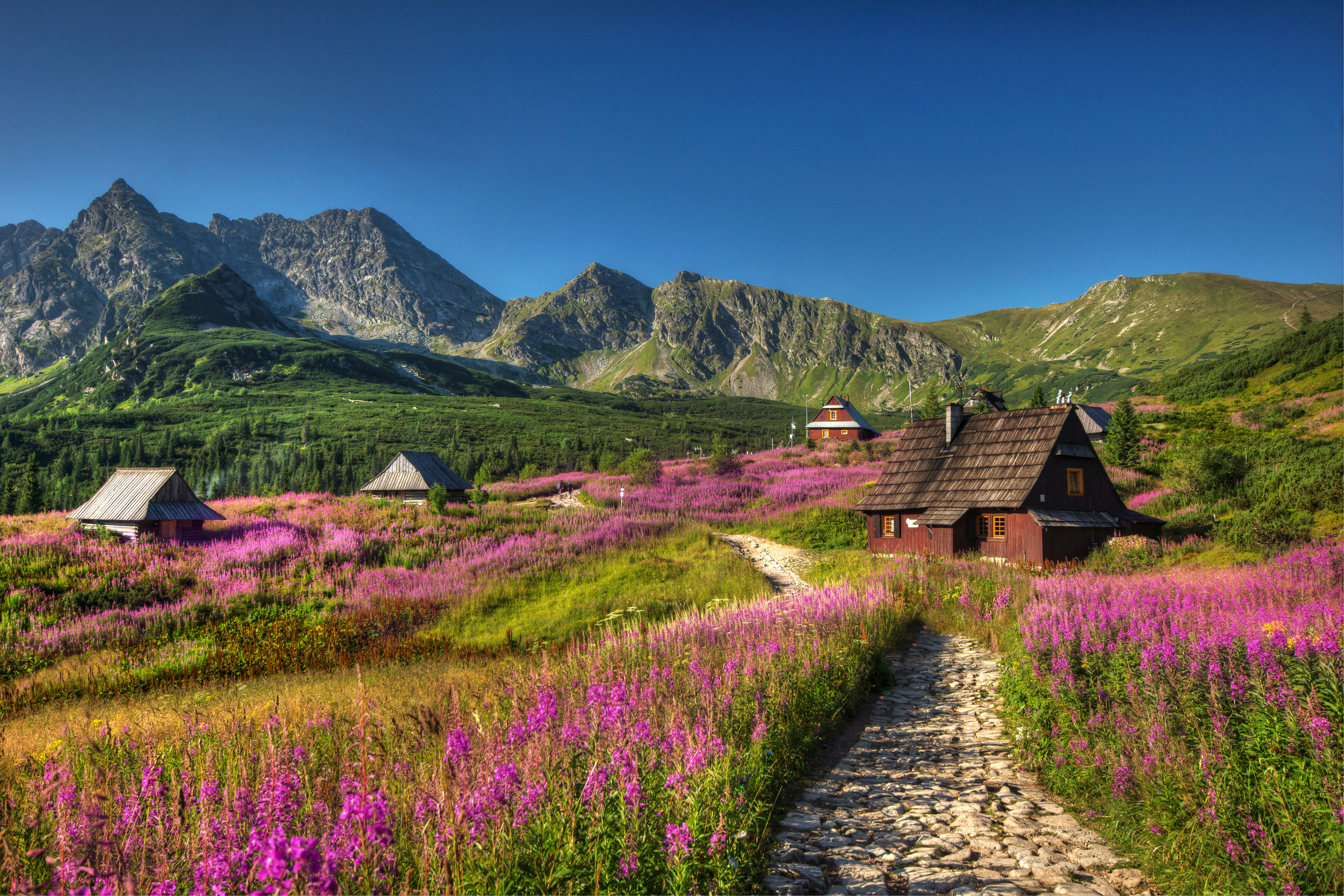
Hala Gąsienicowa

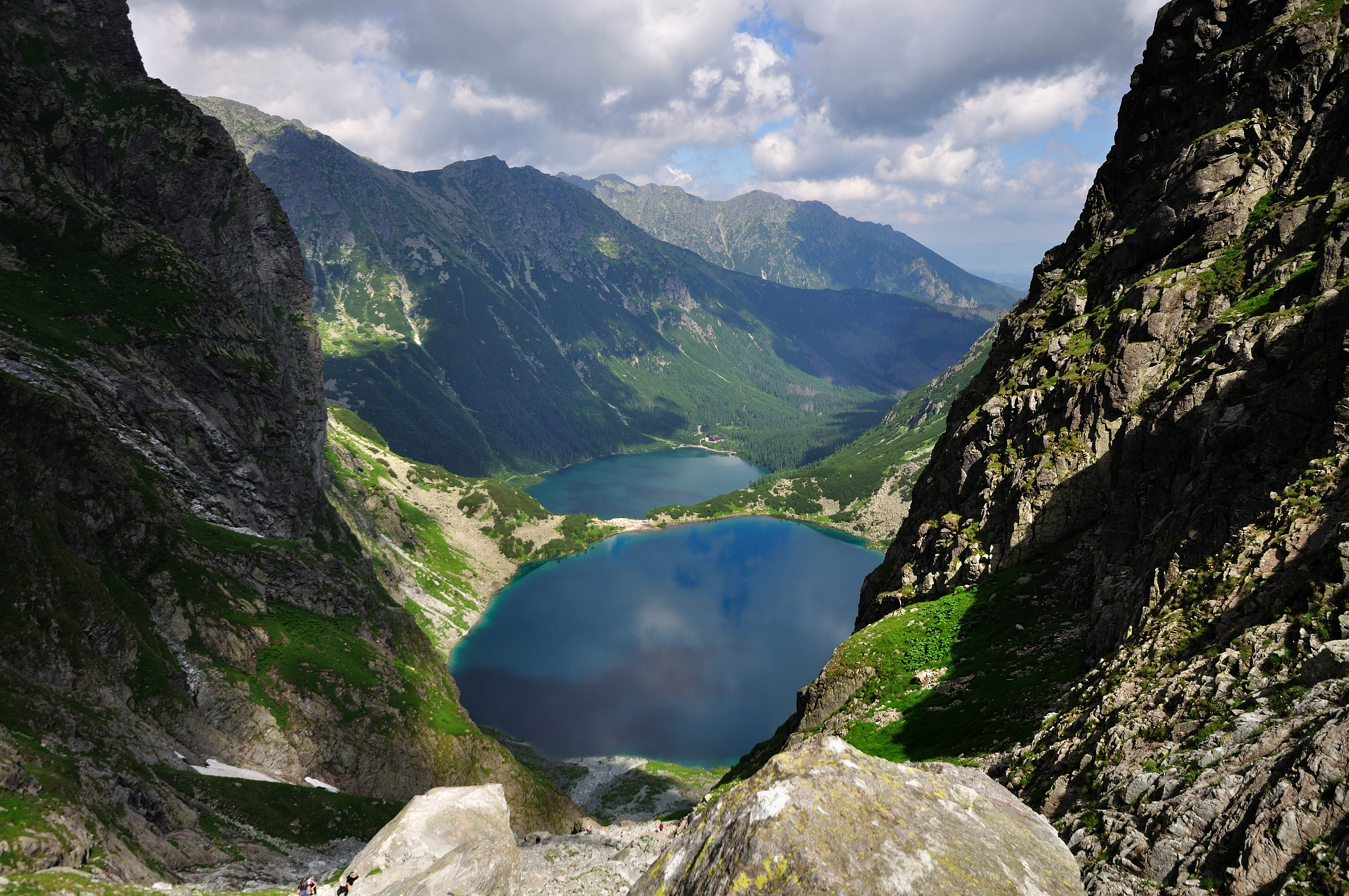
Czarny Staw pod Rysami and Morskie Oko lakes

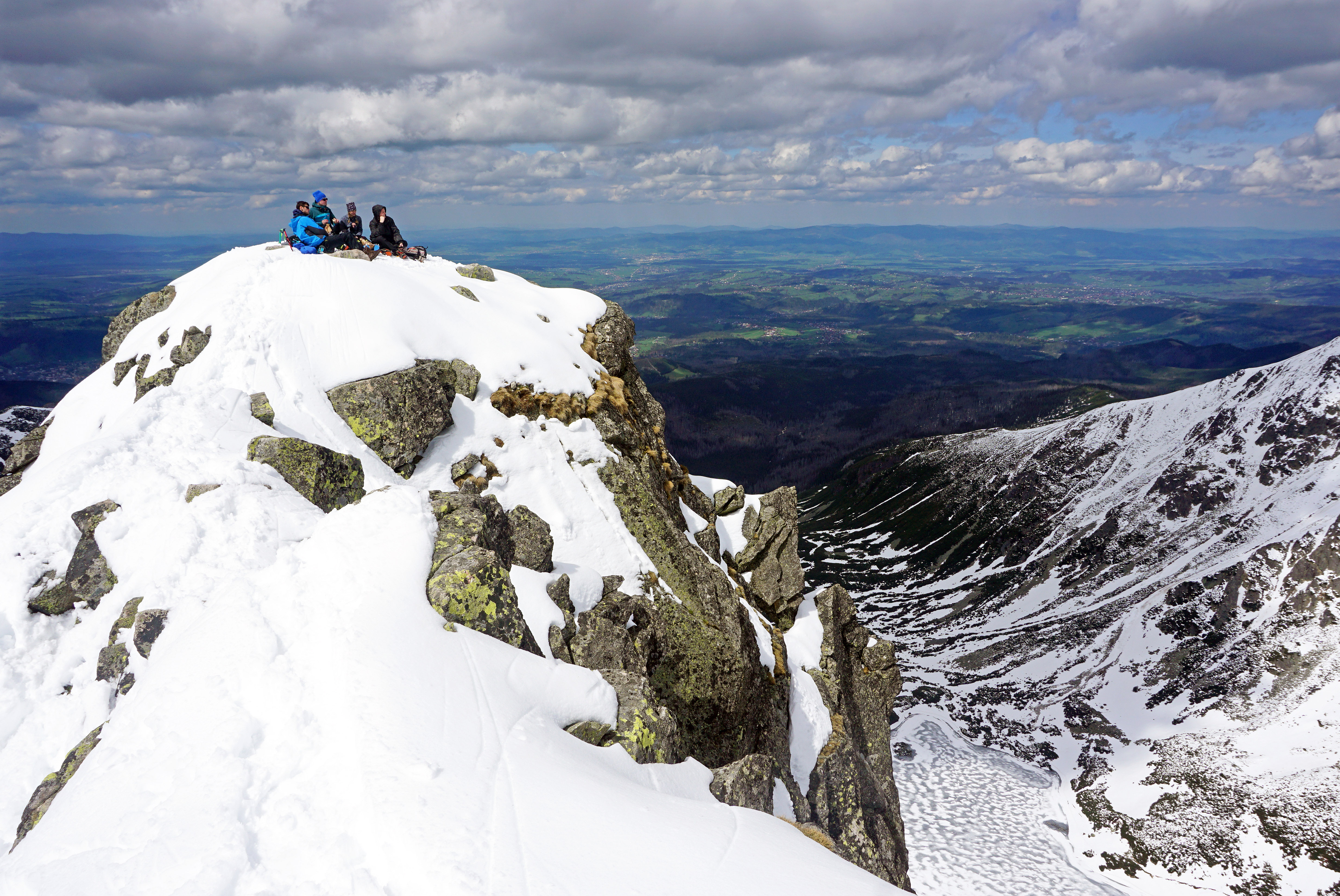
Kościelec, High Tatras

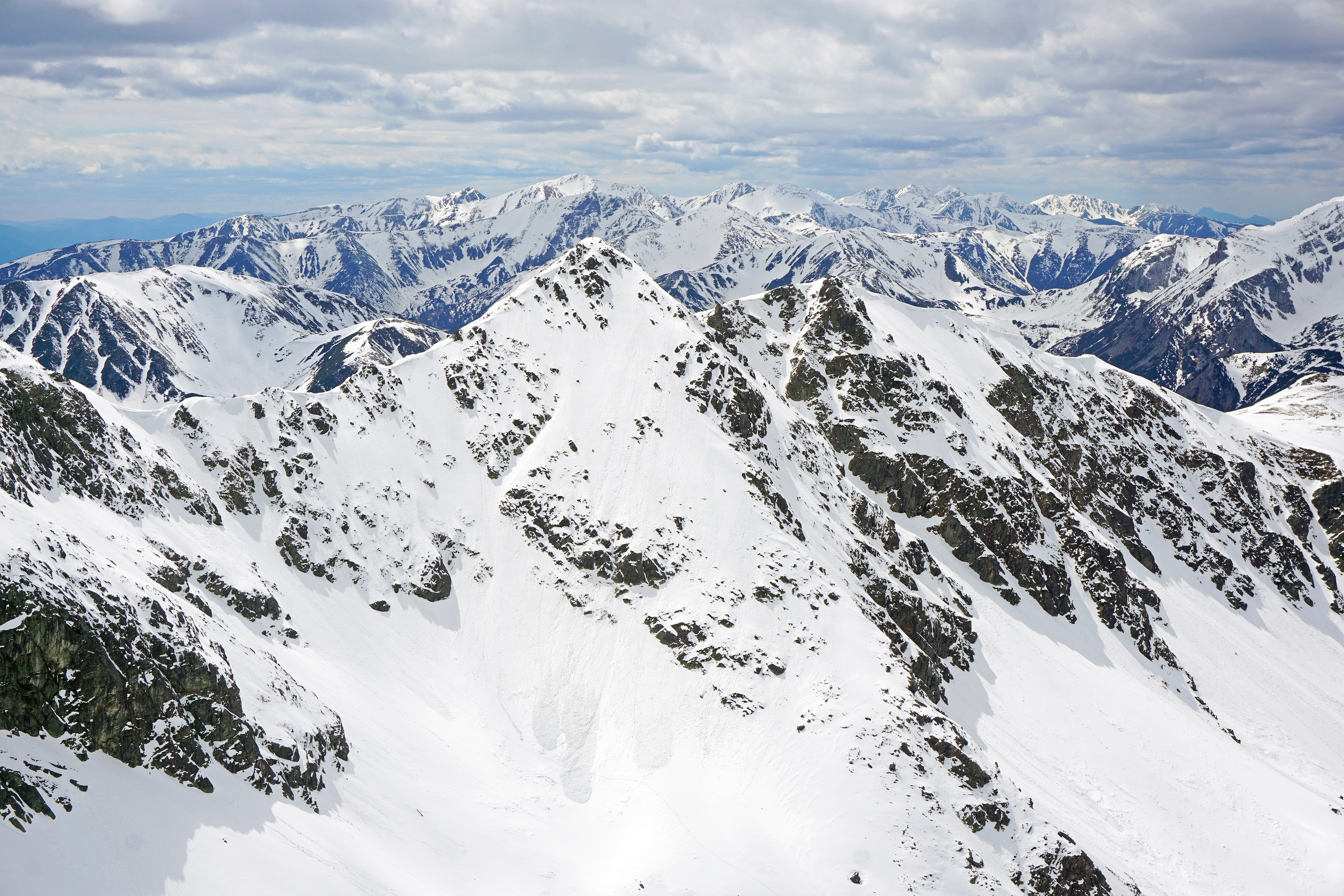
Snow covered Tatras in May 2019

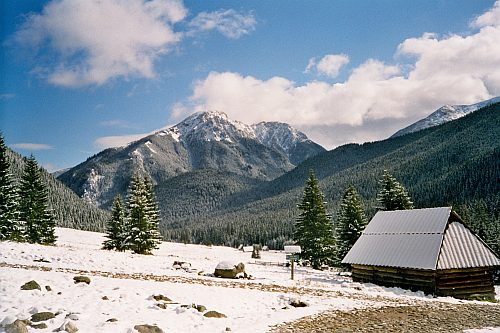
Chochołowska Valley in winter

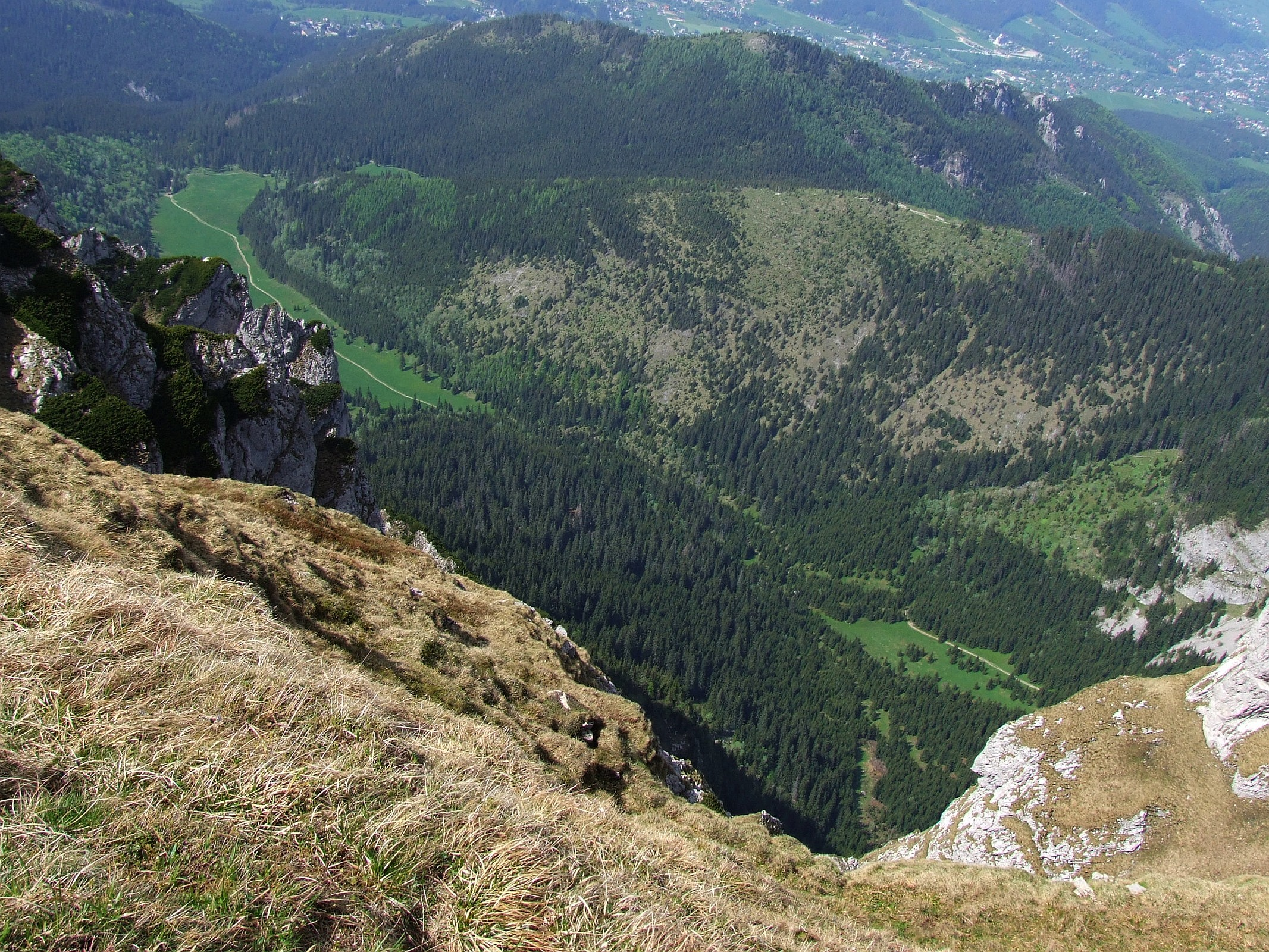
Hala Mała Łąka

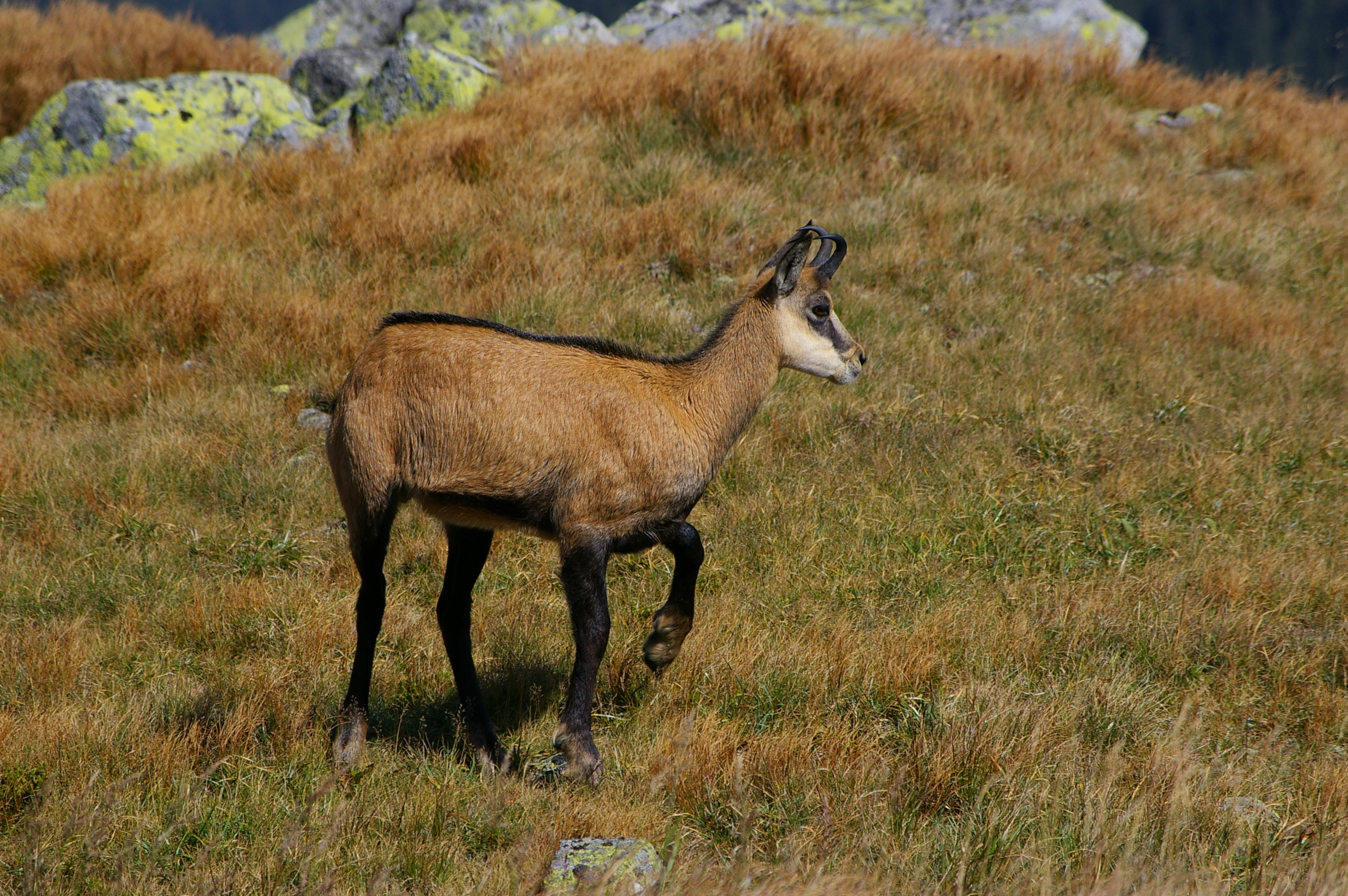
A Tatra chamois

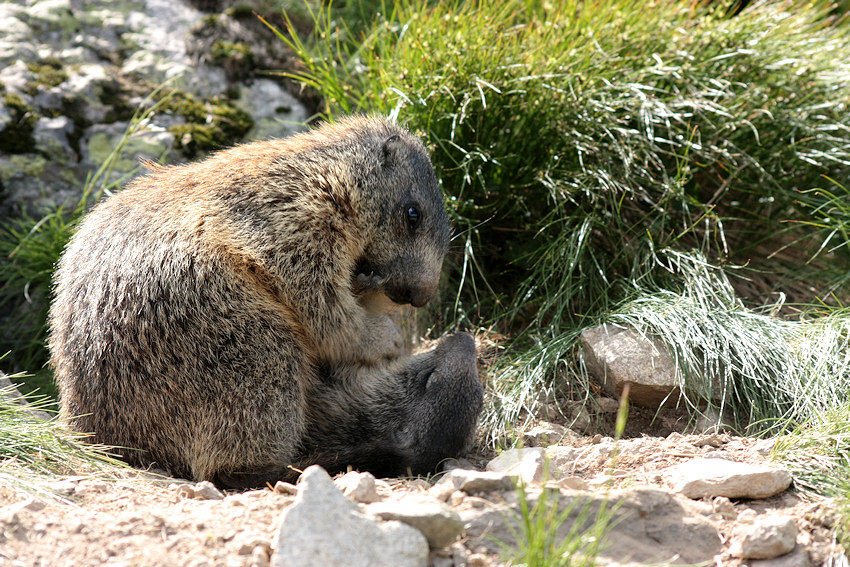
Tatra marmots

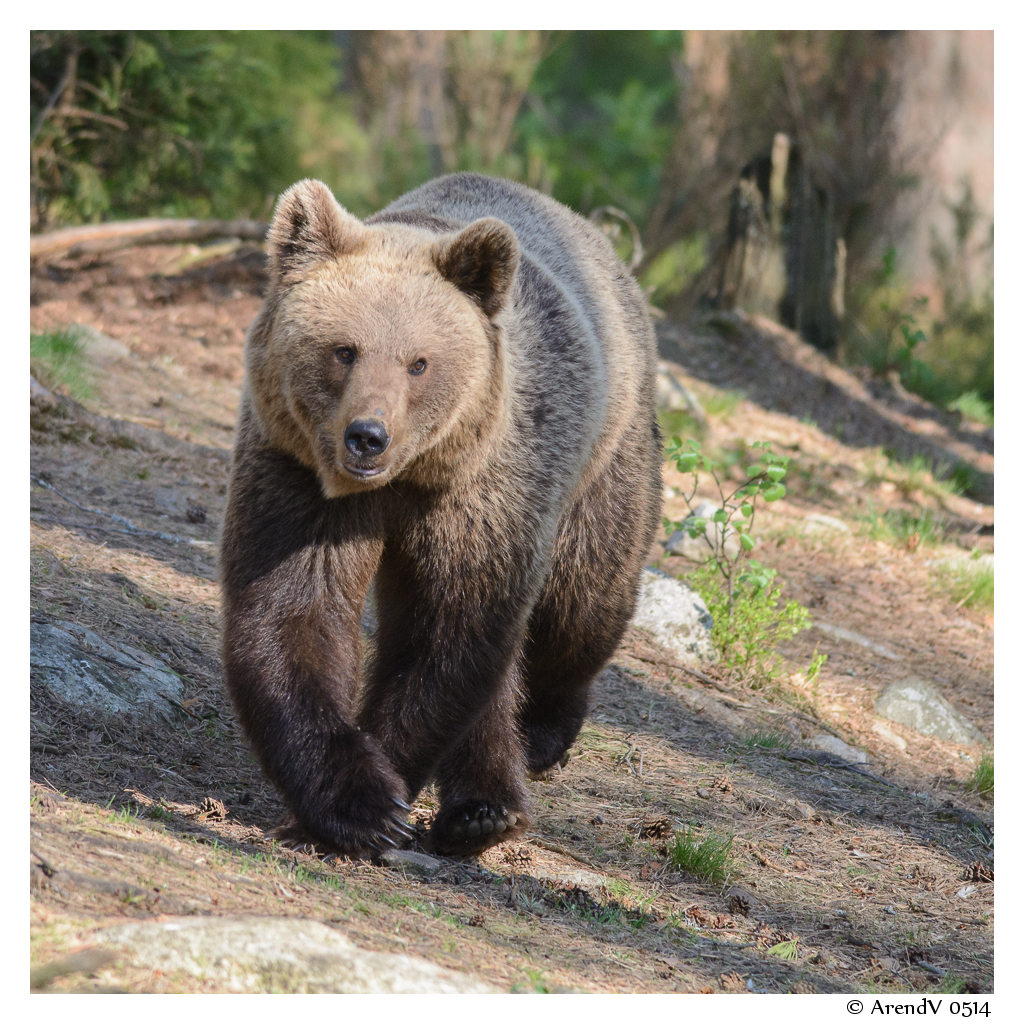
An Eurasian brown bear

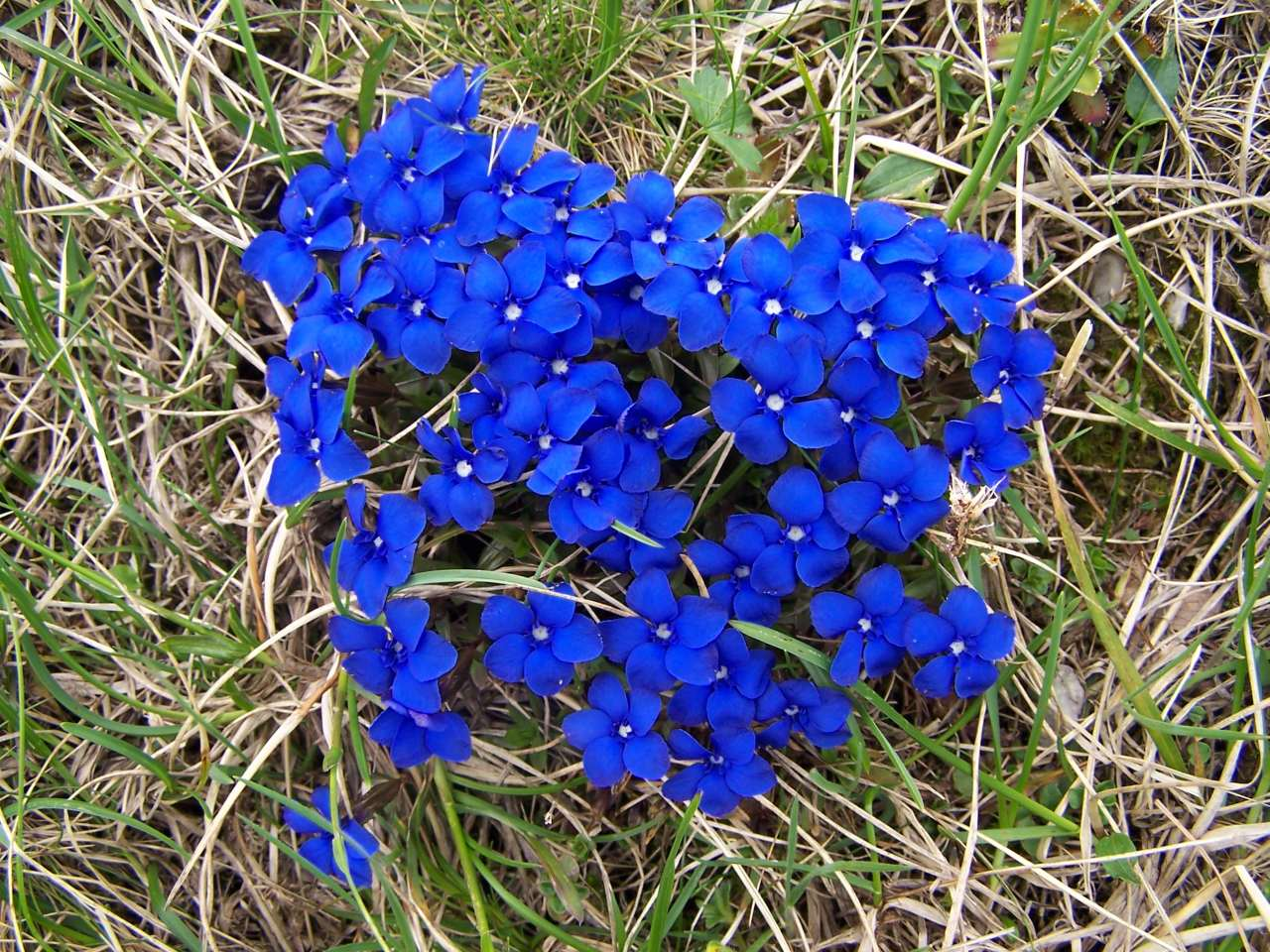
Gentiana verna

== See also ==
- Tatra National Park, Slovakia — biosphere reserve partner.
- Western Carpathians Ranges
- List of national parks of Poland
