= Mickiewicz Falls =

Waterfall in the Tatra National Park, Poland

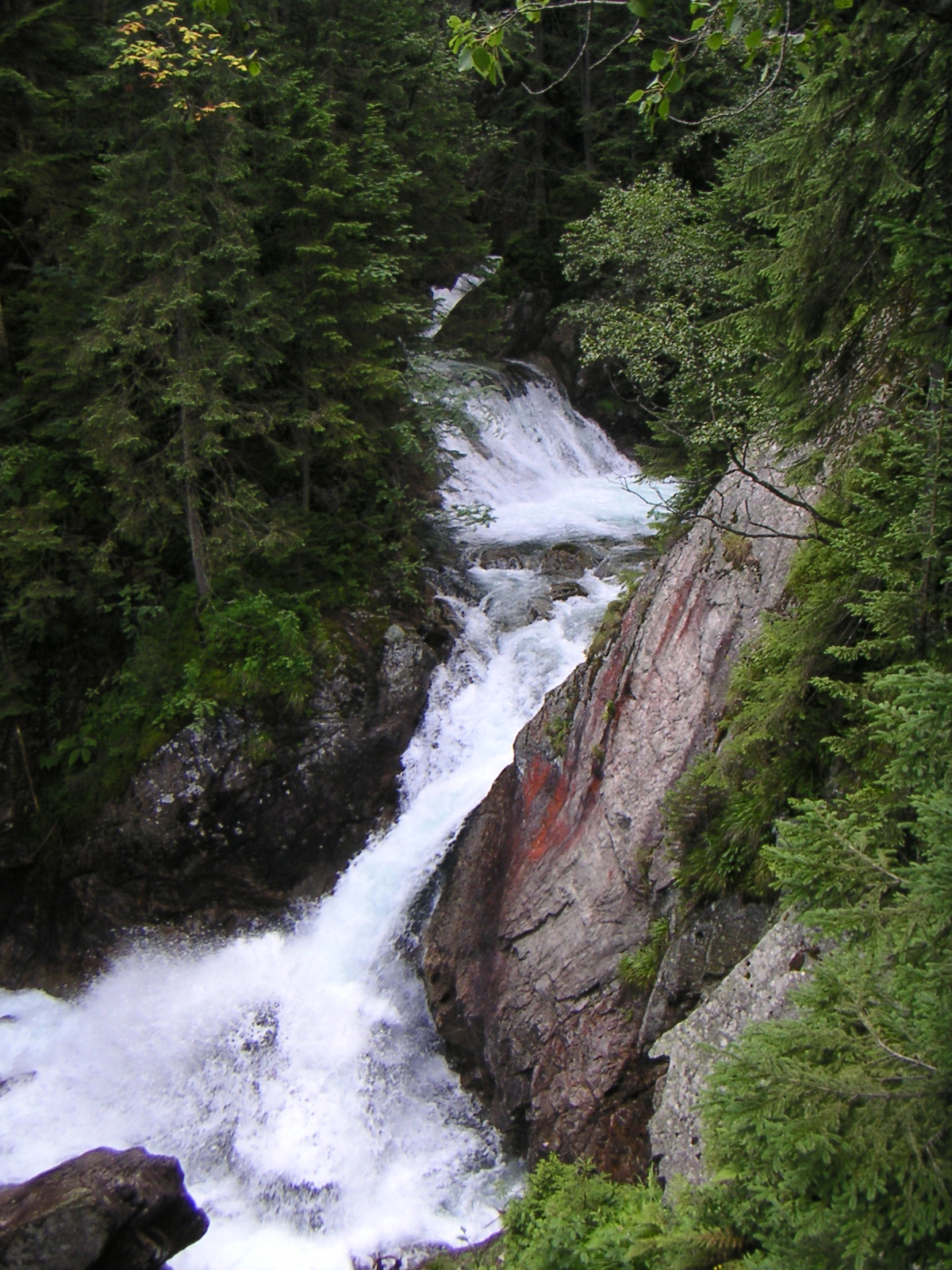
- Mickiewicz Falls in High Tatras.
- Interactive map of Mickiewicz Falls
- Location: Tatra Mountains, Poland
- Coordinates: 49.23416°N 20.08683°E
- Type: Cascade
- Elevation: 1,099 m (3,606 ft)
- Total height: 10 m (33 ft)
- Watercourse: Roztoka

Mickiewicz Falls (pronounced: [mit͡sˈkjɛvit͡ʂ]; Polish: Wodogrzmoty Mickiewicza; Slovak: Mickiewiczove vodopády, German: Mickiewiczfälle; Hungarian: Mickiewicz-vízesések) is a waterfall in the Tatra National Park, Lesser Poland, consisting of three main cascades dropping a total of 10 metres (33 ft).

It lies in the Roztoka Valley on the Roztoka Stream approximately 1 km away from its confluence with the Białka River. It was named in honour of Polish Romanic-era poet and playwright Adam Mickiewicz (1798–1855).

== History ==
The Polish name of the waterfall, Wodogrzmoty, is derived from the words woda (water) and grzmot (thunder). It received such a name due to the loud noise it produces especially after heavy rainfalls. In 1891, the Polish Tatra Society (today known as Polish Tourist and Sightseeing Society, PTTK) officially named the waterfall after Adam Mickiewicz to celebrate the fact that in the previous year the poet's ashes were transferred to the country and laid at the Wawel Cathedral in Kraków. A commemorative plaque on this event was unveiled by the society near the waterfall in the same year. Mickiewicz himself had no connections to the Tatra Mountains or Podhale and had never even visited this region. The only reference to the Tatras in Mickiewicz's works can be found in his 1836 French-language play Les confédérés de Bar.

The first known tourists to have visited the waterfall were Walery Eljasz-Radzikowski together with his mountain guide Maciej Sieczka in 1879. The waterfalls have been accessible to tourists since 1886, when paths leading to them were created. In 1900, a stone bridge was built near the waterfalls on the Oswald Balzer Trail leading to Lake Morskie Oko.

== Description ==
Mickiewicz Falls is located at 1,099 metres (3,606 ft) above sea level in the High Tatras and consists of three main cascades: Upper Cascade (Wyżni Wodogrzmot), Middle Cascade (Pośredni Wodogrzmot) and Lower Cascade (Niżni Wodogrzmot). The falls are on the Roztoka Stream, which flows out of the Valley of the Five Polish Lakes. The cascades measure 10 meters in height.

== See also ==
- Geography of Poland
- List of waterfalls
- Siklawa Falls
