= Black Lake Falls =

Waterfall in the Tatra Mountains, Poland

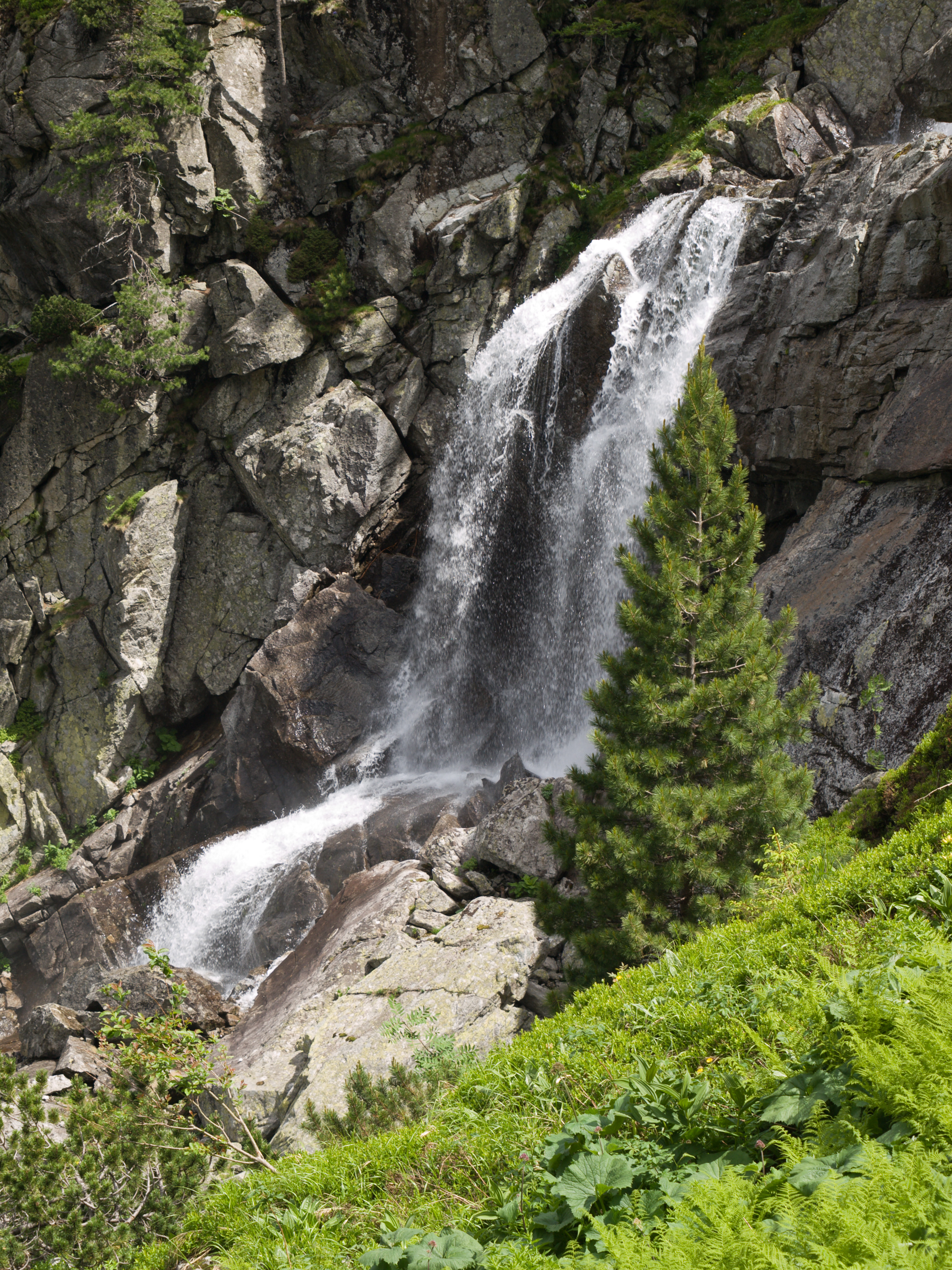
- Upper cascade of the waterfall
- Interactive map of Black Lake Falls
- Location: Tatra Mountains, Poland
- Coordinates: 49.191451°N 20.072805°E
- Type: Cascade
- Elevation: 1,570 m (5,150 ft)
- Total height: 40 m (130 ft)
- Watercourse: Black Lake Stream

Black Lake Falls (Polish: Czarnostawiańska Siklawa) is a waterfall located in the Tatra National Park, High Tatras, Poland, dropping a total of approximately 40 metres (130 ft). The waterfall has been formed on the Black Lake Stream (Polish: Czarnostawiański Potok) in the Rybi Potok Valley and flows out of Lake Czarny Staw pod Rysami located over Lake Morskie Oko. The waterfall falls down in two main cascades, the upper one lies at 1,570 metres (5,150 ft) above sea level while the lower one is at 1,460 metres (4,790 ft).

== See also ==
- Geography of Poland
- List of waterfalls
- Siklawa Falls, highest waterfall in Poland
