= Niżnie Rysy =

Mountain between Poland and Slovakia

- Malé Rysy
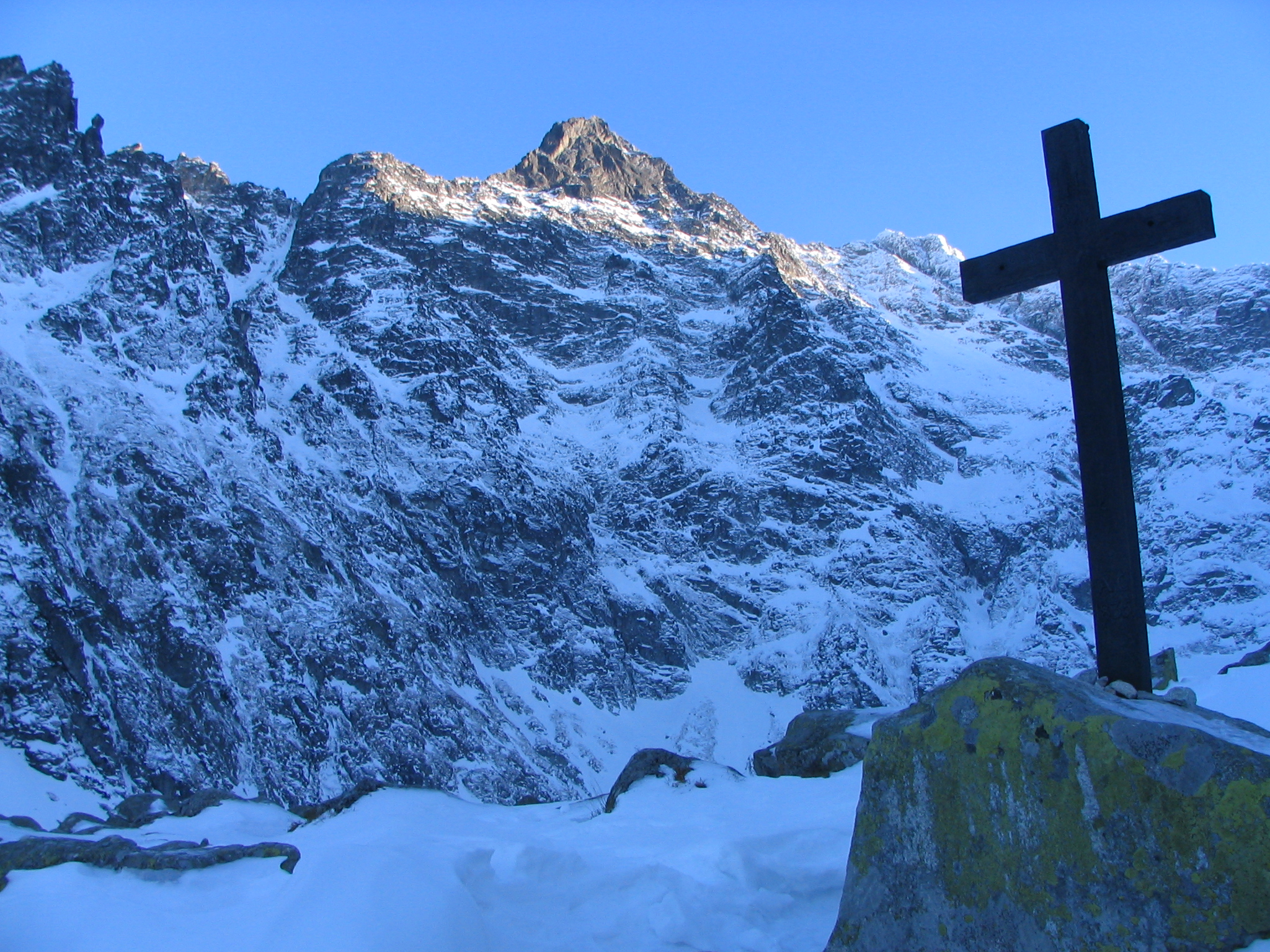
- Niżnie Rysy seen from Czarny Staw

Highest point
- Elevation: 2,430 m (7,970 ft)
- Prominence: 60 m (200 ft)
- Coordinates: 49°10′59″N 20°05′17″E

Geography
- Countries: Poland and Slovakia
- Regions: Lesser Poland and Prešov
- Parent range: High Tatras, Tatra Mountains

Climbing
- First ascent: 1905 by Jakub Bachleda, Janusz Chmielowski and Adam Kroebl

Niżnie Rysy (Slovak: Malé Rysy) is a mountain made up of four granite peaks, the highest of which has an elevation of 2430 meters, making it overall the third highest mountain in Poland. It is situated in the High Tatras mountain range on the border between Poland and Slovakia, immediately north of Rysy.
