= Czarny Staw pod Rysami =

Lake in the Tatra Mountains, southern Poland

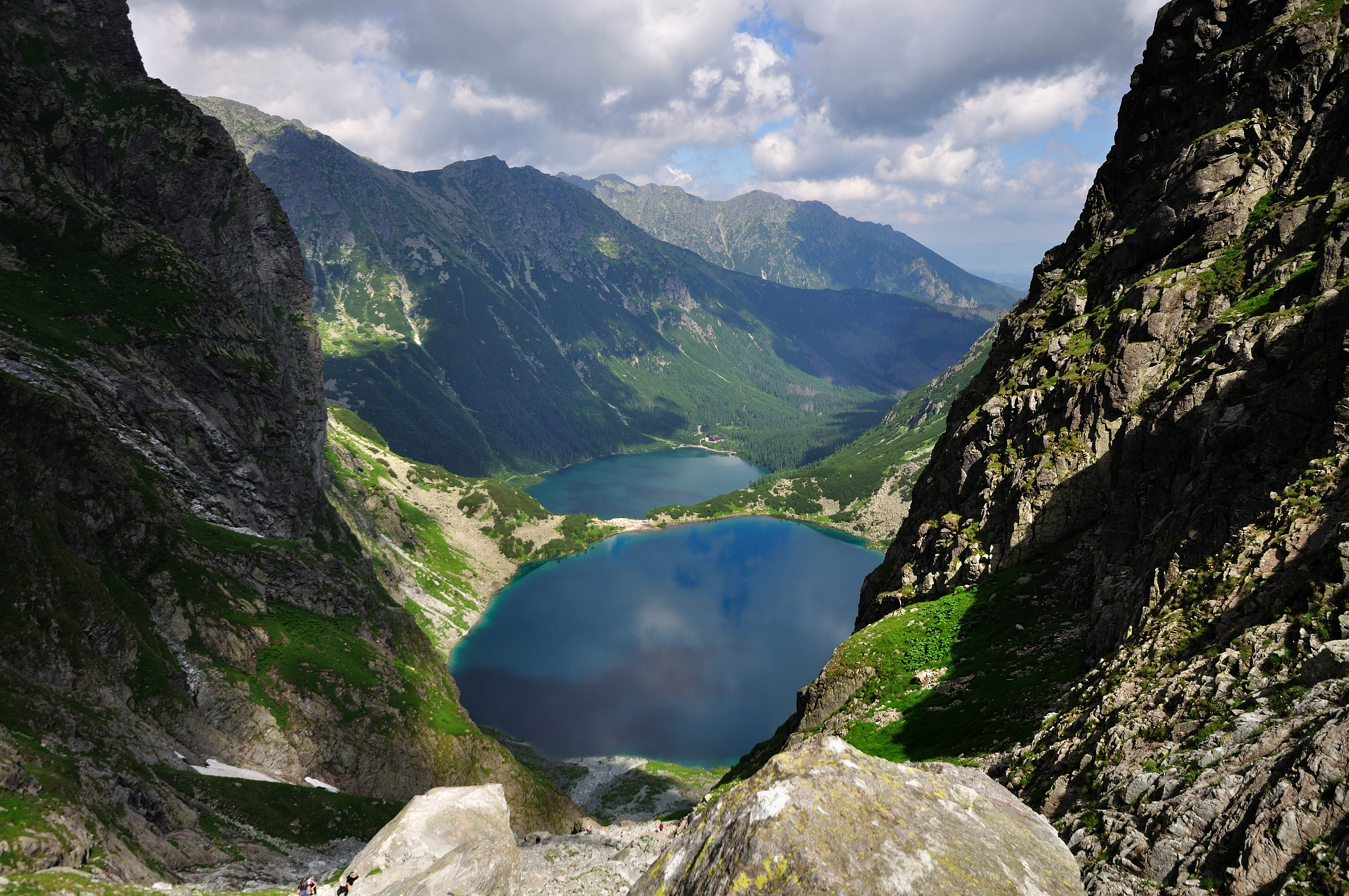
- Czarny Staw pod Rysami and Morskie Oko

- Location within Poland
- Location: Tatra Mountains
- Coordinates: 49°11′18″N 20°4′34″E
- Primary outflows: Morskie Oko
- Basin countries: Poland
- Max. length: 578 m (1,896 ft)
- Max. width: 444 m (1,457 ft)
- Surface area: 20.54 ha (0.0793 sq mi)
- Max. depth: 76 m (249 ft)
- Water volume: 7,761,700 m^{3} (274,100,000 cu ft)m³
- Surface elevation: 1,583 m (5,194 ft)

Czarny Staw pod Rysami, or Black Lake below Mount Rysy in English, is a mountain lake in the Tatra Mountains, Southern Poland. It is located on the Polish side of the highest mountain in Poland; Mount Rysy. At 1,583 m above sea level, it overlooks the nearby lake of Morskie Oko. With a maximum depth of 76 m (249 ft), it's the second deepest Tatra lake after Wielki Staw Polski, and the fourth deepest lake in Poland. A walking path goes around the lake, and leads up to Mount Rysy, or down to Morskie Oko.

== Ascent route ==
To get to Czarny Staw from Morskie Oko you must follow the red trail on the Eastern side of Morskie Oko. Once you have reached about half-way you will see a signpost that has directions on how to get to Czarny Staw. After crossing the rocky inclined path, you will arrive at Czarny Staw. The trip takes about 50 mins going up from Morskie Oko and 40 minutes going back down.

== Topography ==
Czarny Staw, is similar in shape to a circle. It is located at an altitude of 1,583 m, i.e. 188 m higher than Morskie Oko. The area of Czarny Staw is approximately 20.54 ha (0.0793 sq mi), with a maximum depth of 76.4 m and capacity of 7,761,700 m³ of water. The lake is almost completely surrounded by a high ridge consisting of Kazalnica Mięguszowiecka, Mięguszowiecki Szczyt Czarny through to Wołowy Grzbiet, Rysy, Niżnie Rysy, Żabia Grań with Żabi Szczyt Wyżni, Żabi Mnich and Owcze Turniczki. The meltwater of Czarny Staw falls in small cascades down to Morskie Oko, creating a waterfall called Czarnostawiańska Siklawa

== Gallery ==
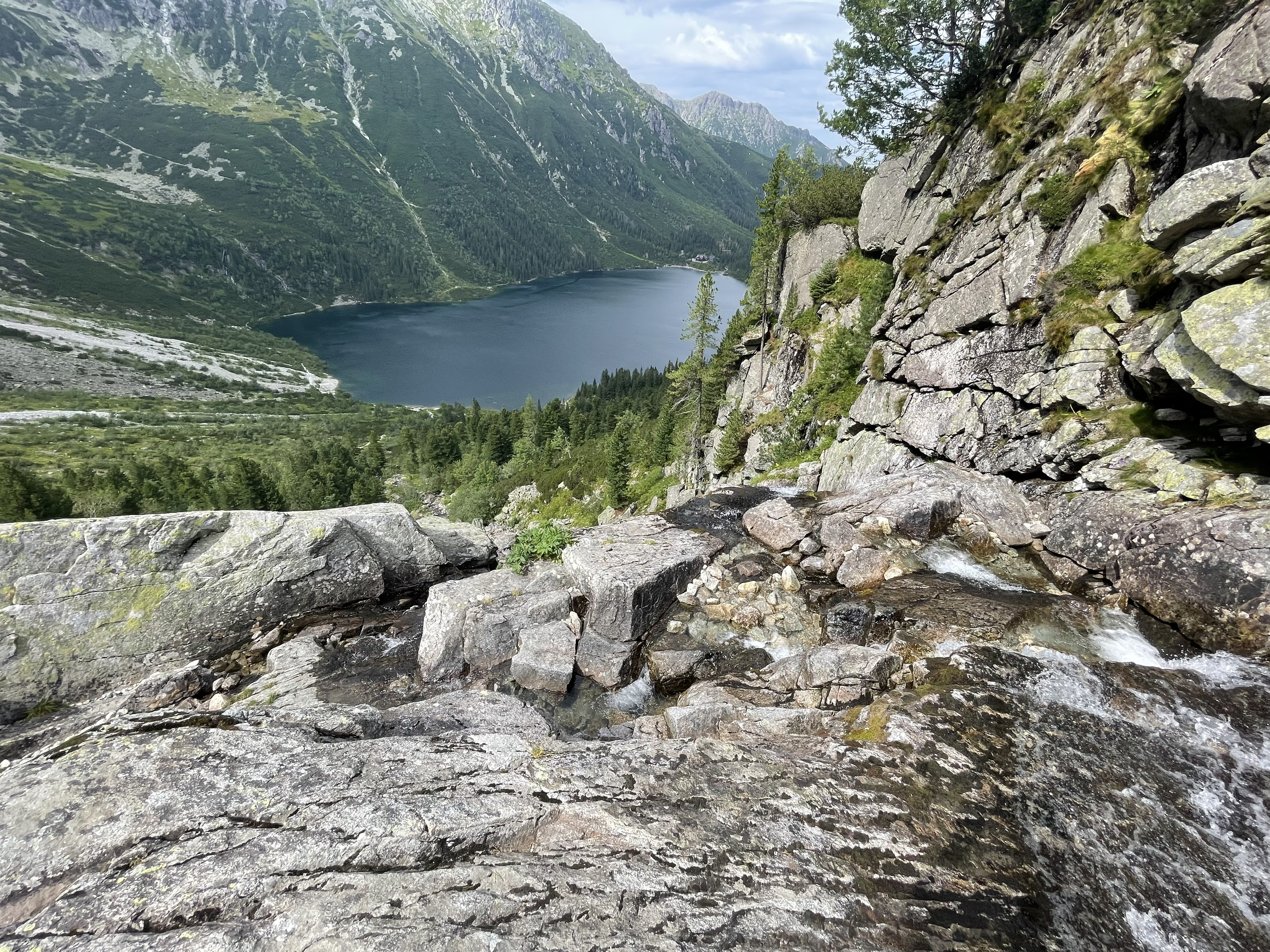
Small cascades from Czarny Staw to Morskie oko

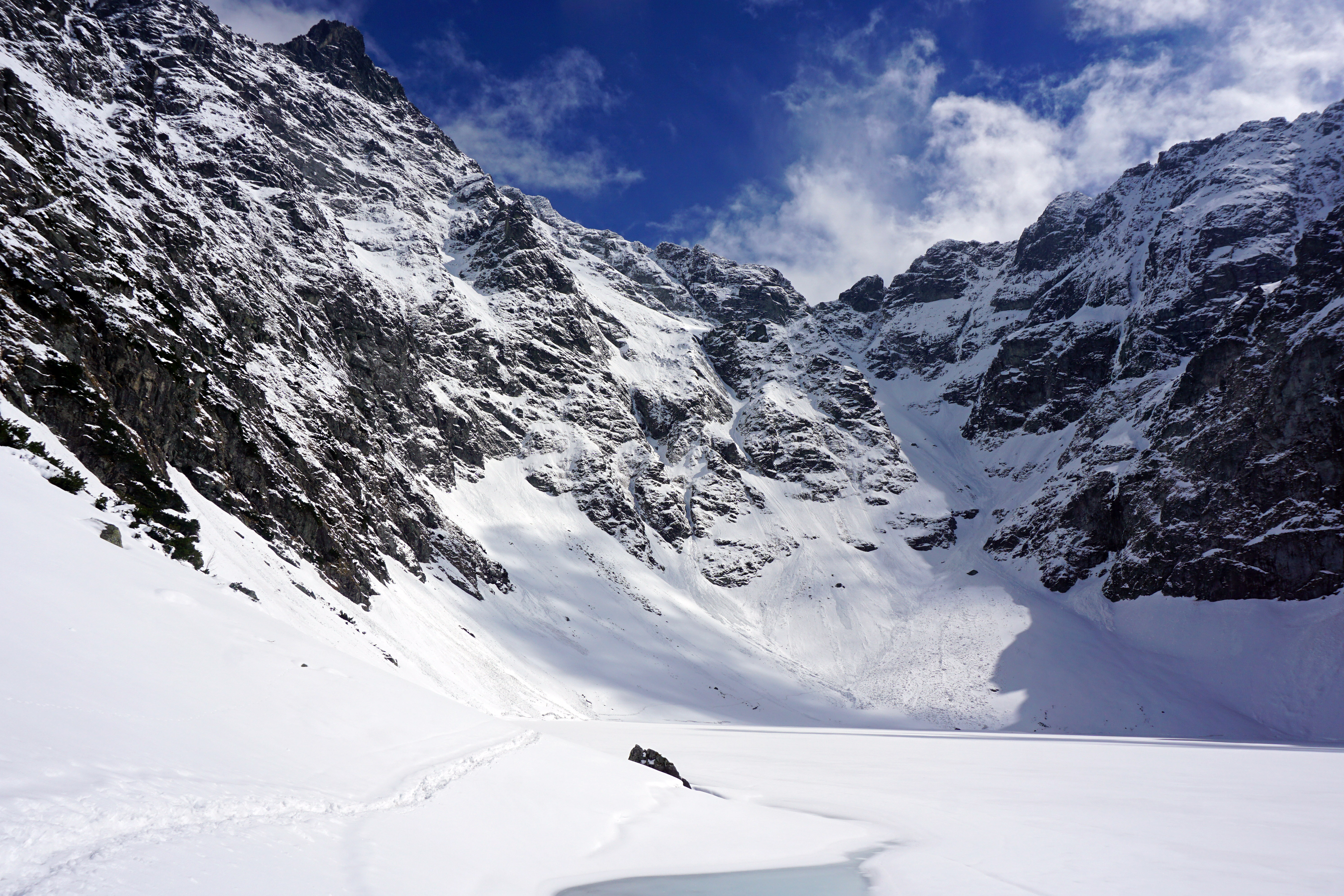
Czarny Staw pod Rysami in May

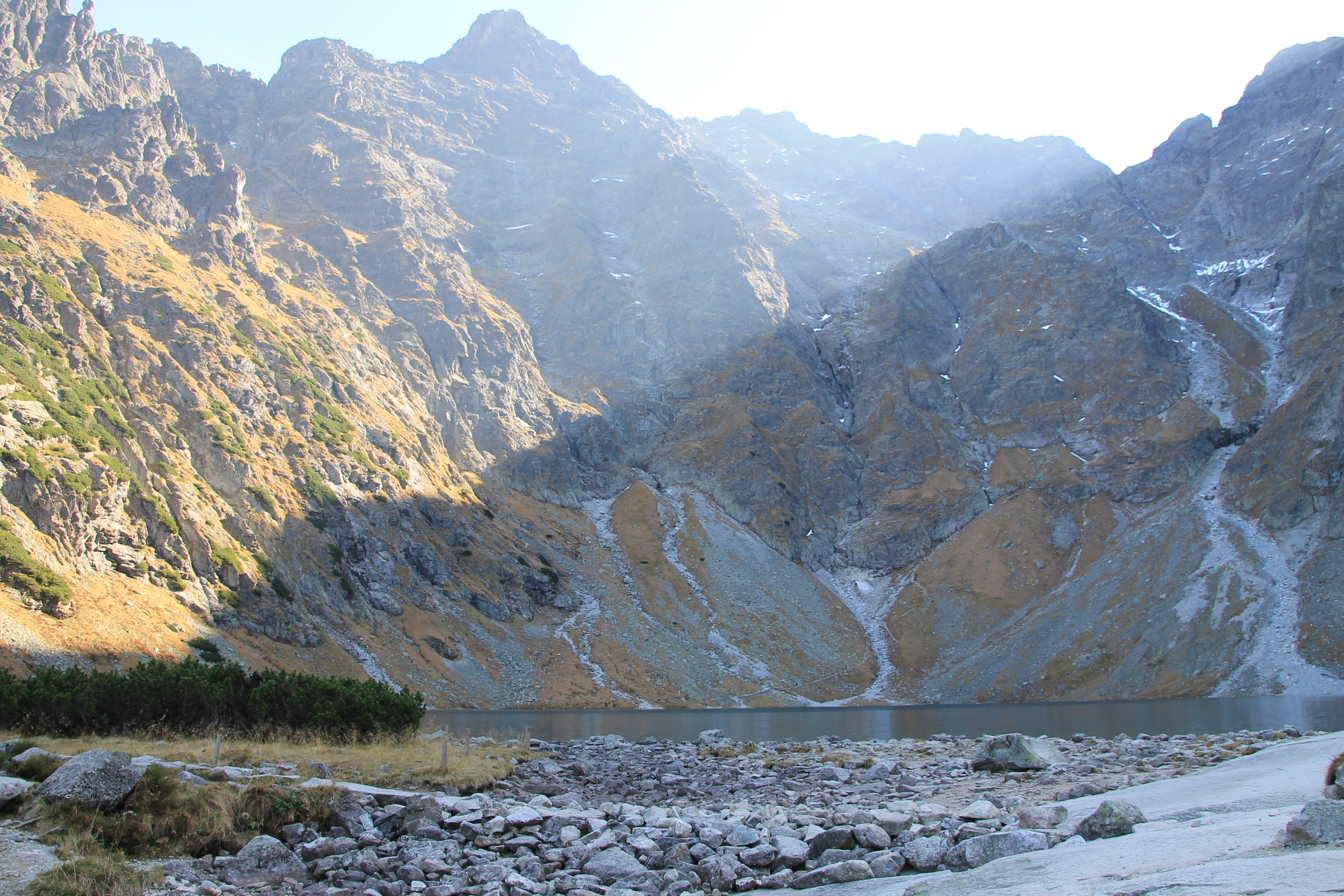
Czarny Staw located below Rysy

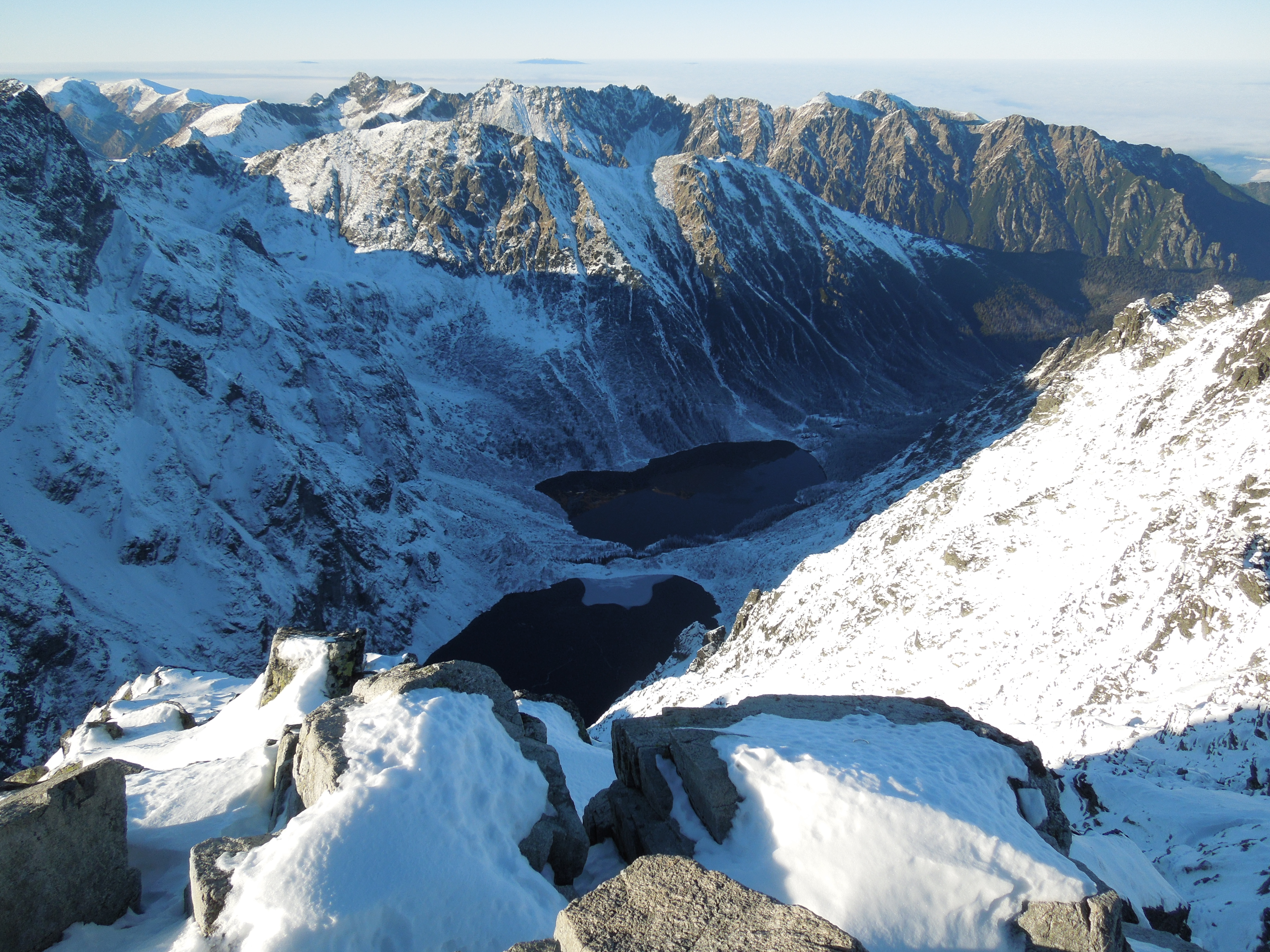
View from Rysy to Czarny Staw pod Rysami and Morskie Oko

== See also ==
- Black Lake Falls
