= Wielki Staw Polski =

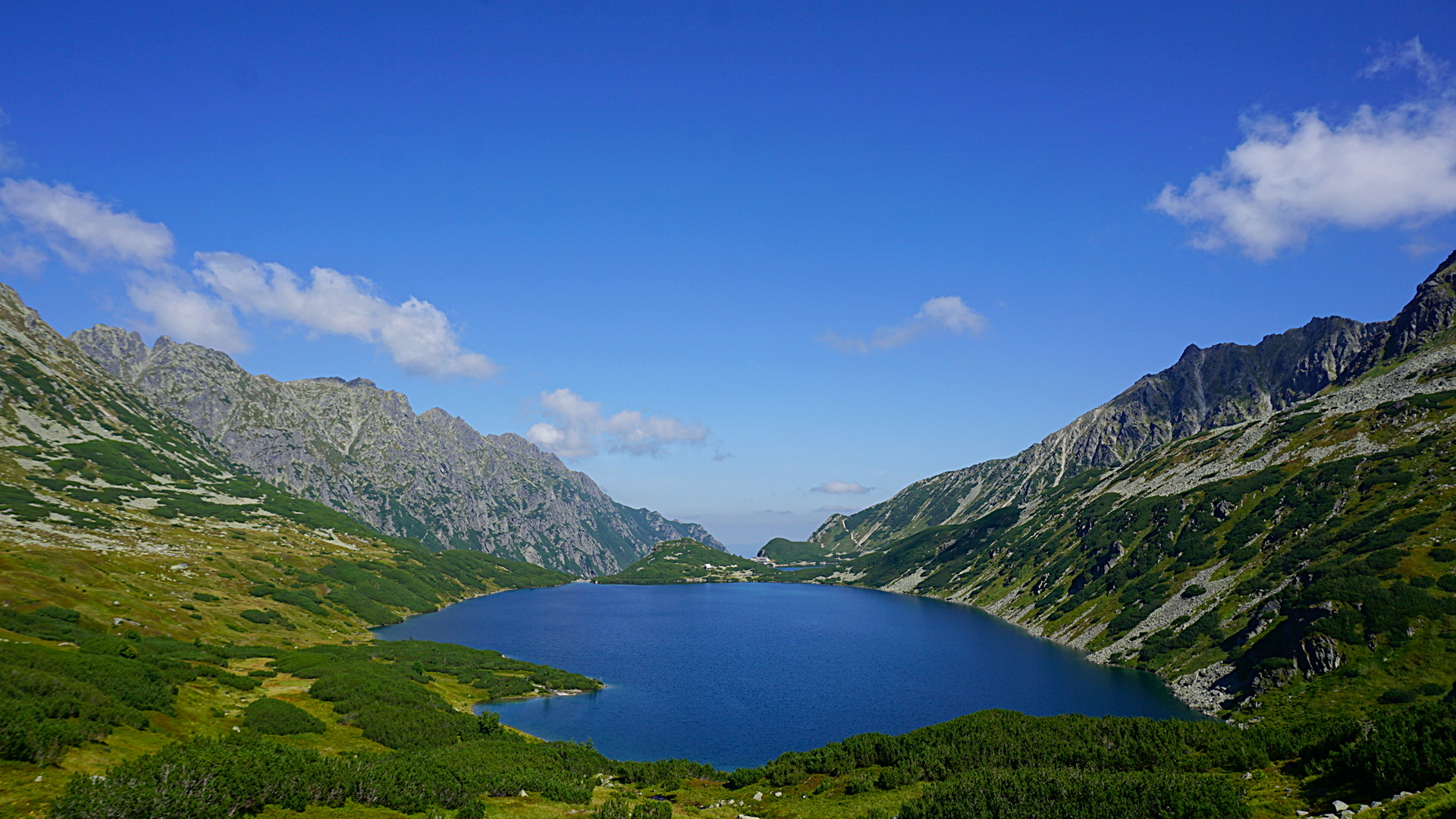
- Wielki Staw Polski seen from the trail to Szpiglasowa Przełęcz

- Location within Lesser Poland Voivodeship
- Coordinates: 49°12′33″N 20°02′27″E
- Type: lake
- Primary outflows: Roztoka
- Basin countries: Poland
- Max. length: 0.998 km (0.620 mi)
- Max. width: 0.452 km (0.281 mi)
- Surface area: 3.414 km^{2} (1.318 sq mi)
- Max. depth: 79.3 m (260 ft)
- Water volume: 12,967,000 m^{3} (10,513 acre⋅ft)
- Surface elevation: 1,665 m (5,463 ft)
- Islands: Stodółka

Wielki Staw Polski (Slovak: Veľký stav) is a tarn in the High Tatras in the Lesser Poland Voivodeship in Poland. It is located at an elevation of 1,665 metres (5,463 ft) in the Valley of the Five Polish Lakes, by the slope of the Miedziane, near the Polish-Slovak border. It is the second largest lake by area (34.14 hectares (84.4 acres)) in the Tatra Mountains, just after Morskie Oko (34.54 hectares (85.4 acres)).

Wielki Staw Polski is the deepest and longest (998 metres (3,274 ft)) lake in the Tatra Mountains, and the third deepest lake in Poland (the deepest is Hańcza). Its volume is around 13 million m^{3} of water, and it is the largest lake by volume in the Tatra Mountains, making up a third of the entire volume of all Tatra lakes. The highest temperature of its water was 11.2 °C (52.2 °F).

== See also ==
- Siklawa Falls
