= Rysy =

Mountain in the High Tatras

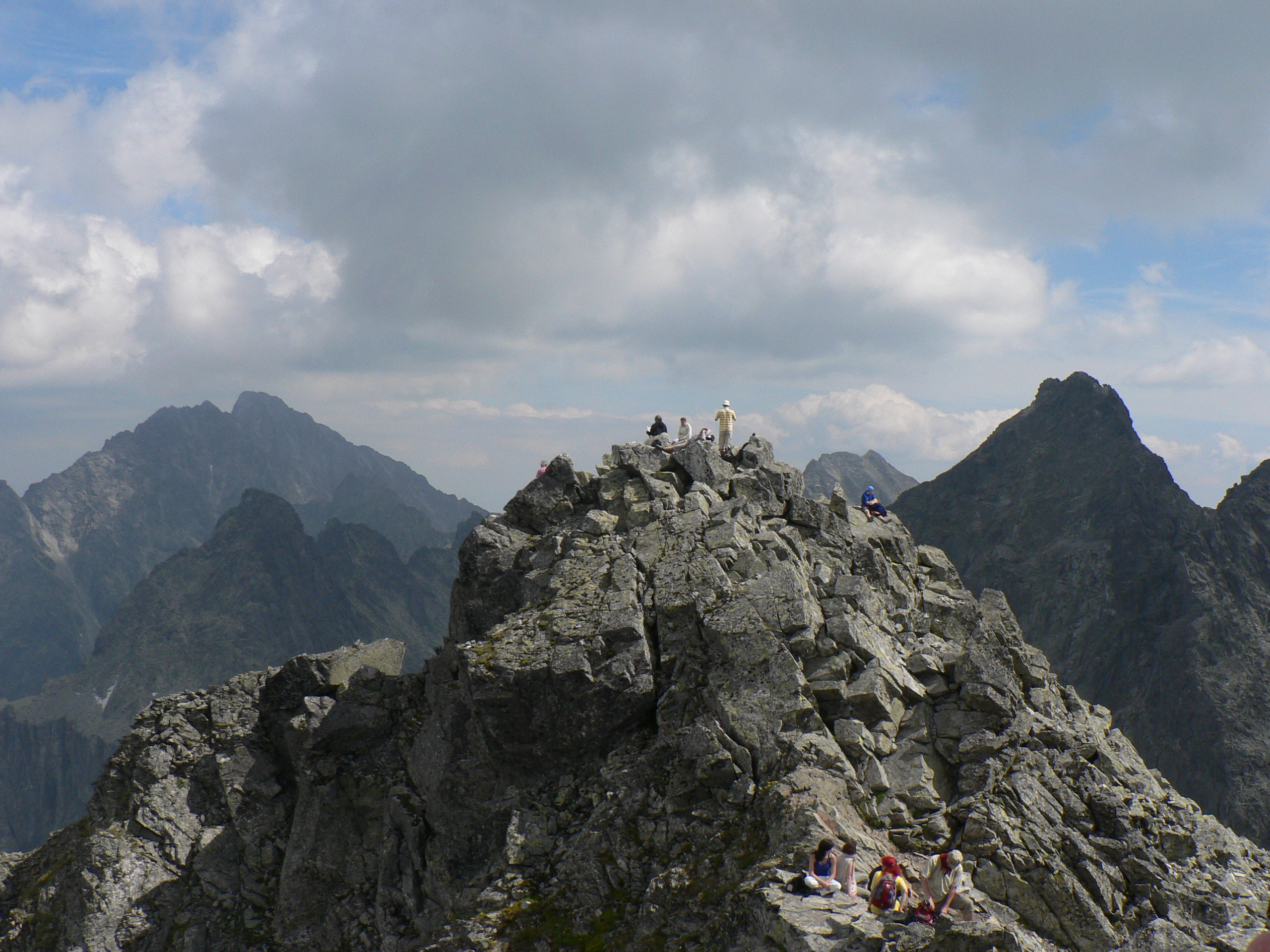
- Main summit

Highest point
- Elevation: 2,501 m (8,205 ft)
- Prominence: 161 m (528 ft)
- Parent peak: Vysoká
- Listing: Country high point (Poland); Mountains of Poland
- Coordinates: 49°10′46″N 20°5′17″E

Naming
- English translation: scratches or crevices
- Language of name: Polish and Slovak

Geography
- Location within Lesser Poland Voivodeship Location within Poland Location within Slovakia
- Countries: Poland; Slovakia
- Parent range: High Tatras

Geology
- Mountain type: Granite

Climbing
- First ascent: 1840 by Ede Blásy, Ján Ruman-Driečny
- Easiest route: Hiking

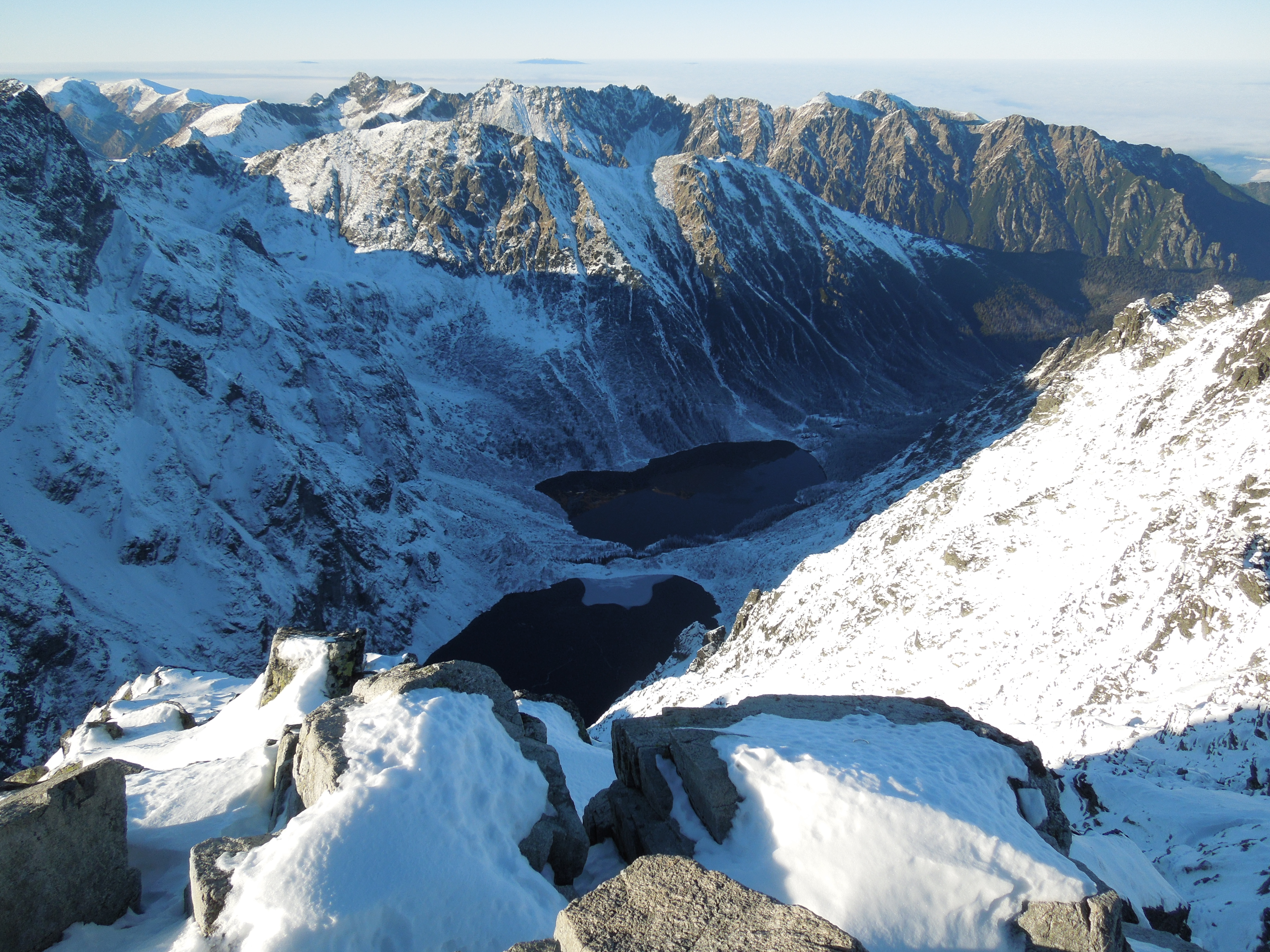
Mountain lakes of Czarny Staw pod Rysami and Morskie Oko seen from Rysy.

Rysy (Polish: [ˈrɨsɨ]; Slovak: [ˈrisi]; German: Meeraugspitze, Hungarian: Tengerszem-csúcs) is a mountain in the crest of the High Tatras, eastern part of the Tatra Mountains, located on the border between Poland and Slovakia. Rysy has three summits: the middle at 2,501 m (8,205 ft); the north-western at 2,500 m (8,202 ft); and the south-eastern at 2,473 m (8,114 ft). The north-western summit is the highest point of Poland and belongs to the Crown of Polish Mountains; the other two summits are on the Slovak side of the border.

== Name ==
Experts assume that the Polish and Slovak name Rysy, meaning "scratches" or "crevices", refers to a series of couloirs, either those on the western slopes of Żabie Ridge or the very prominent 500 m (1,600 ft) high couloir and numerous smaller ones on the northern side. A folk explanation on the Slovak side says that the name comes from the plural word rysy meaning "lynxes", although the habitat of the lynx does not extend above the timberline.

The Hungarian name Tengerszem-csúcs and the German name Meeraugspitze mean "eye-of-the-sea peak", from the glacial lake at the northern foot of the mountain, called "eye of the sea" (Morskie Oko in Polish).

== History ==
The first known ascent was made in 1840, by Ede Blásy and his guide Ján Ruman-Driečny Sr. The first winter ascent was completed in 1884, by Theodor Wundt and Jakob Harvey.

== Hiking the peak ==
It is possible to reach the peak from the Slovak side, starting at Štrbské pleso and passing Chata pod Rysmi, a mountain chalet at an altitude of 2,250 m (7,380 ft). Between November 1 and June 1, the trail and chalet on the Slovak side are closed.

The mountain can also be ascended from the Polish side coming from the Morskie Oko lake, which is a more spectacular route, but at the same time brings more difficulties and exposure. The trail leads from Morskie Oko to Czarny Staw, and from there first along the northern slope and then the west wall. Due to its location, the trail can have snow cover until the second half of June, and winter equipment might be required for the ascent then.

The winter ascent from the Polish side is a serious climb requiring the right equipment (crampons, ice axe) and skills, often with a large avalanche threat. There have been serious avalanche events, including fatal ones. The average slope of the route above the Czarny Staw is around 30 degrees. In the Rysa couloir, the slope is about 40 degrees to its halfway point, and in the upper part, the incline reaches up to 44 degrees.

Since the accession of Poland and Slovakia to the Schengen Agreement in 2007, the border between the two countries may be easily crossed at this point like at any other.

== See also ==
- Orla Perć
- Giewont
- Tourism in Poland
- Tourism in Slovakia
- Geography of Poland
- Geography of Slovakia
- Tatra Volunteer Search and Rescue (Poland)
- Mountain Rescue Service (Slovakia)
- List of highest paved roads in Europe
- List of mountain passes
