= Morskie Oko =

Lake in the Tatra Mountains, southern Poland

Morskie Oko Eye of the Sea

- Location within Lesser Poland Voivodeship
- Interactive map of Morskie Oko; Eye of the Sea
- Coordinates: 49°11′50″N 20°4′15″E
- Type: Moraine-dammed
- Primary inflows: Czarny Staw pod Rysami
- Primary outflows: Rybi Potok
- Basin countries: Poland
- Max. length: 0.862 km (0.536 mi)
- Max. width: 0.566 km (0.352 mi)
- Surface area: 0.3493 km^{2} (0.1349 sq mi)
- Max. depth: 50.8 m (167 ft)
- Surface elevation: 1,395 m (4,577 ft)

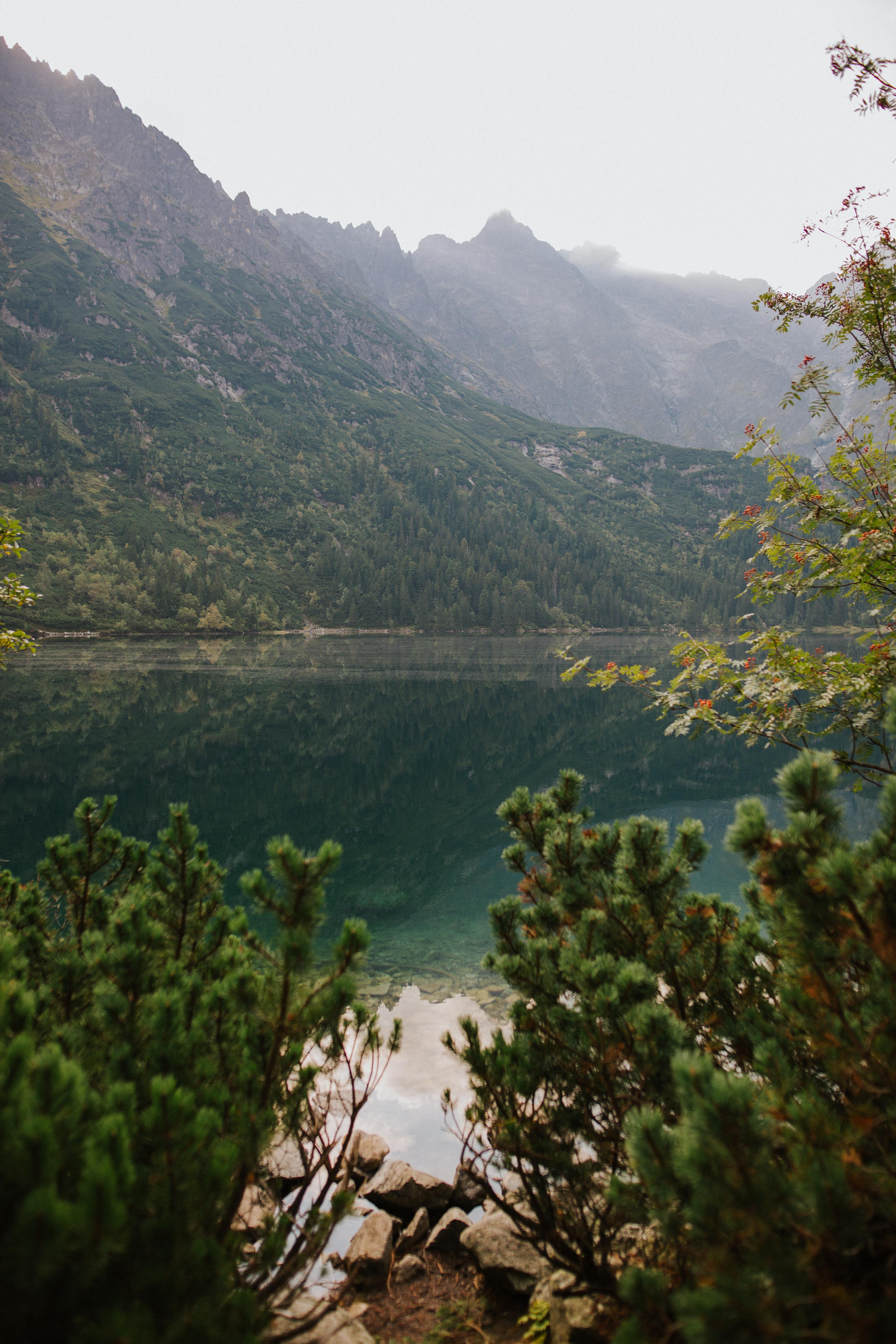
View of Morskie Oko on the left side of the main entrance

Morskie Oko, or Eye of the Sea in English, is the largest and fourth-deepest lake in the Tatra Mountains, in southern Poland. It is located deep within the Tatra National Park in the Rybi Potok (the Fish Brook) Valley, of the High Tatras mountain range at the base of the Mięguszowiecki Summits, in Lesser Poland Voivodeship. In 2014, The Wall Street Journal recognized the lake as one of the five most beautiful lakes in the world.

== Lake description ==
The peaks that surround the lake rise about 1,000 meters above its surface; one of them is Rysy (2,499 meters), the highest peak in the Polish Tatras. Besides Mięguszowiecki Summits (including Mięguszowiecki Szczyt Wielki, 2,438 meters), farther away and slightly to the left, is the distinctive, slender Mnich (“Monk,” 2,068 meters). Many Swiss Pines also grow around the lake.

In the past, Morskie Oko was called "Rybie Jezioro" ("Fish Lake") due to its natural stock of fish, which are uncommon in Tatra lakes and ponds. In the clear depths of the water, one can easily notice trout - so-called "famine" trout - that live in the lake. The name "Morskie Oko" ("Sea Eye", "Eye of the Sea") is derived from an old legend, according to which the lake was connected to the sea via an underground passage.

The hut of the Polish Tourism and Local Lore Society (PTTK) stands on the moraine that closes the lake from the north. The hut is situated 1,405 meters above sea level and belongs to the oldest Tatra chalets. The hut is named after Stanisław Staszic, who explored the lake in 1805. It is a point of departure for hikes to Rysy and Szpiglasowa Przełęcz. Nearby is the Stare Schronisko ("Old Shelter"), originally a coachhouse. Both buildings have been granted historical status.

Morskie Oko is one of the most popular destinations in the Tatras, often receiving over 50,000 visitors during the vacation season. It is reached by foot in about two hours from the nearest road that allows motorized access. Many other tourists opt to take the journey by horse-drawn cart, a large number of which are operated by the local Górale inhabitants. In winter, a short section of the journey is in an avalanche danger zone, and the area can remain cold and rainy even in summer. In the advent of its popularity, visitors have been forbidden from swimming in the lake or feeding the trout.

== History ==
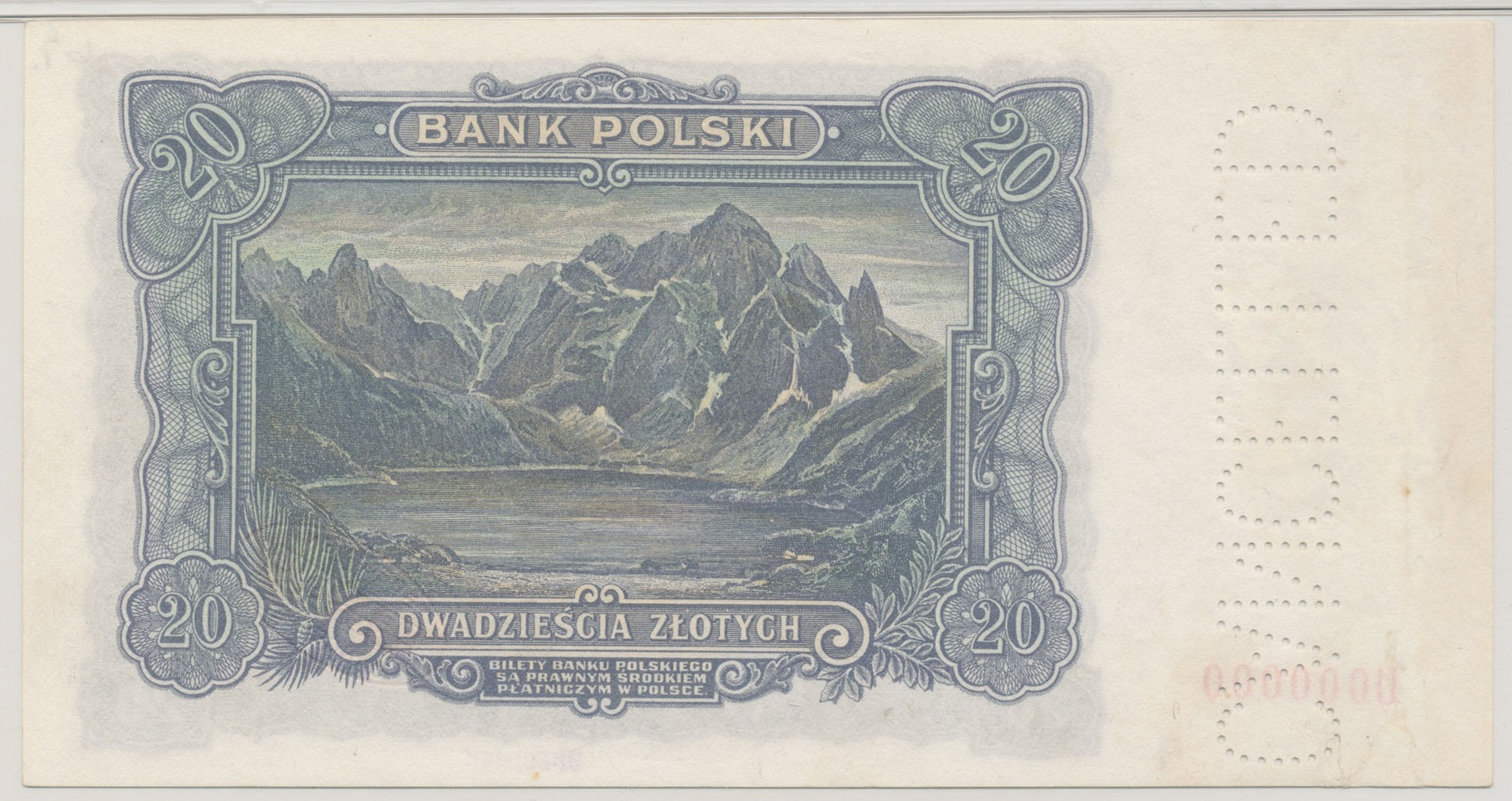
Morskie Oko on a 20 zloty banknote of 1928

The earliest documents in which Morskie Oko is mentioned date back to 1575. In 1637, the Polish king Władysław IV granted landowner Wladyslaw Nowobilski the right to use pastures in the area. In 1824, during Partitions of Poland, Morskie Oko became private property, for the time being, when Zakopane estate, including the Dolina Rybiego Potoku, were purchased from the Austrian authorities by Emanuel Homolacs.

At the end of the nineteenth century, a boundary dispute arose between Galicia and Hungary over property rights to the lake and adjoining area (the so-called "Morskie Oko dispute"). The Court of Conciliation in Graz ruled in favour of the Polish side. A powerful backer of the Polish cause was Count Wladyslaw Zamoyski. The decision is credited to Oswald Balzer, who represented the Galician government.

Morskie Oko was "rediscovered" for tourism by Dr. Tytus Chałubiński in the mid-nineteenth century; the first shelter was built there in 1836 but burned down in 1865. A second shelter, built in 1874, burned down in 1898. In 1902, a road from Zakopane was completed and named the Oswald Balzer Road. Since 1933 following the return of sovereignty, the lake has been owned by the Polish state.

The charm of Morskie Oko has provided inspiration to many artists, including painters (Walery Eljasz-Radzikowski, Leon Wyczółkowski, Stanisław Gałek), poets (Wincenty Pol, Adam Asnyk, Kazimierz Przerwa-Tetmajer, Franciszek Nowicki, Jan Kasprowicz), and composers (Zygmunt Noskowski). The lake was one of the filming locations for 'The Formula', a short film directed by Emmanuel Adjei, starring musician Sevdaliza in 2015.

== Gallery ==
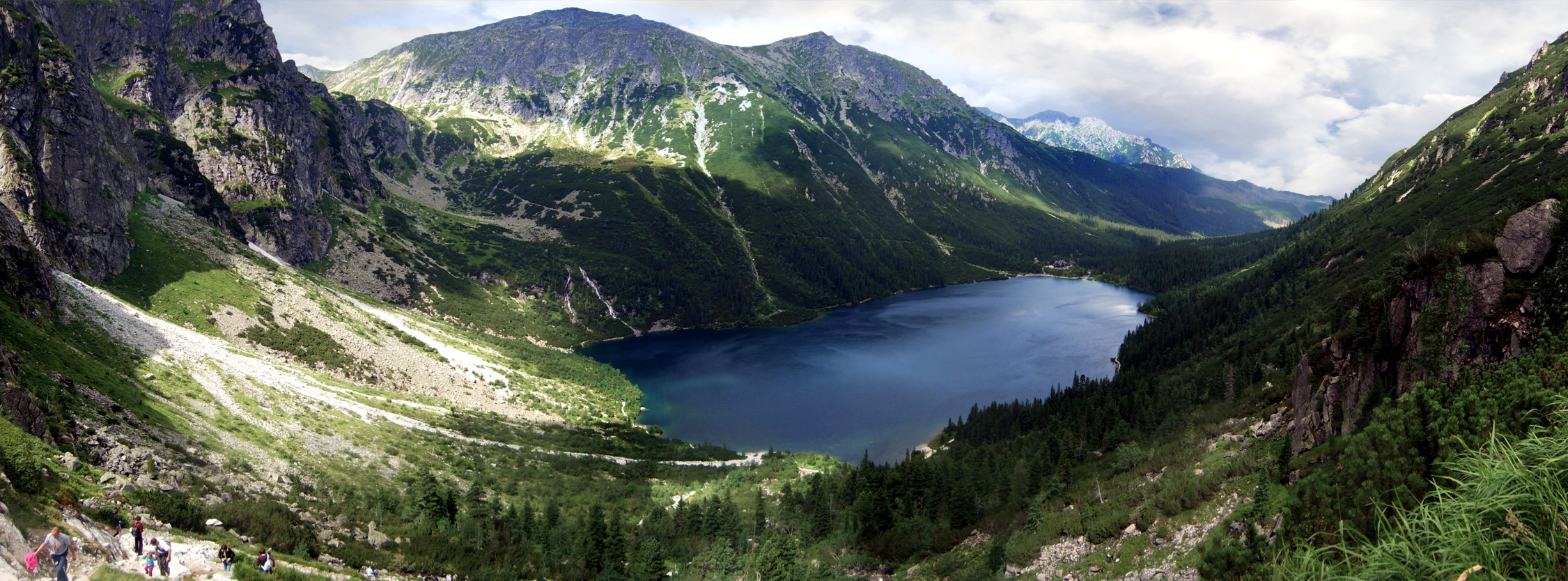
Panoramic view of Morskie Oko

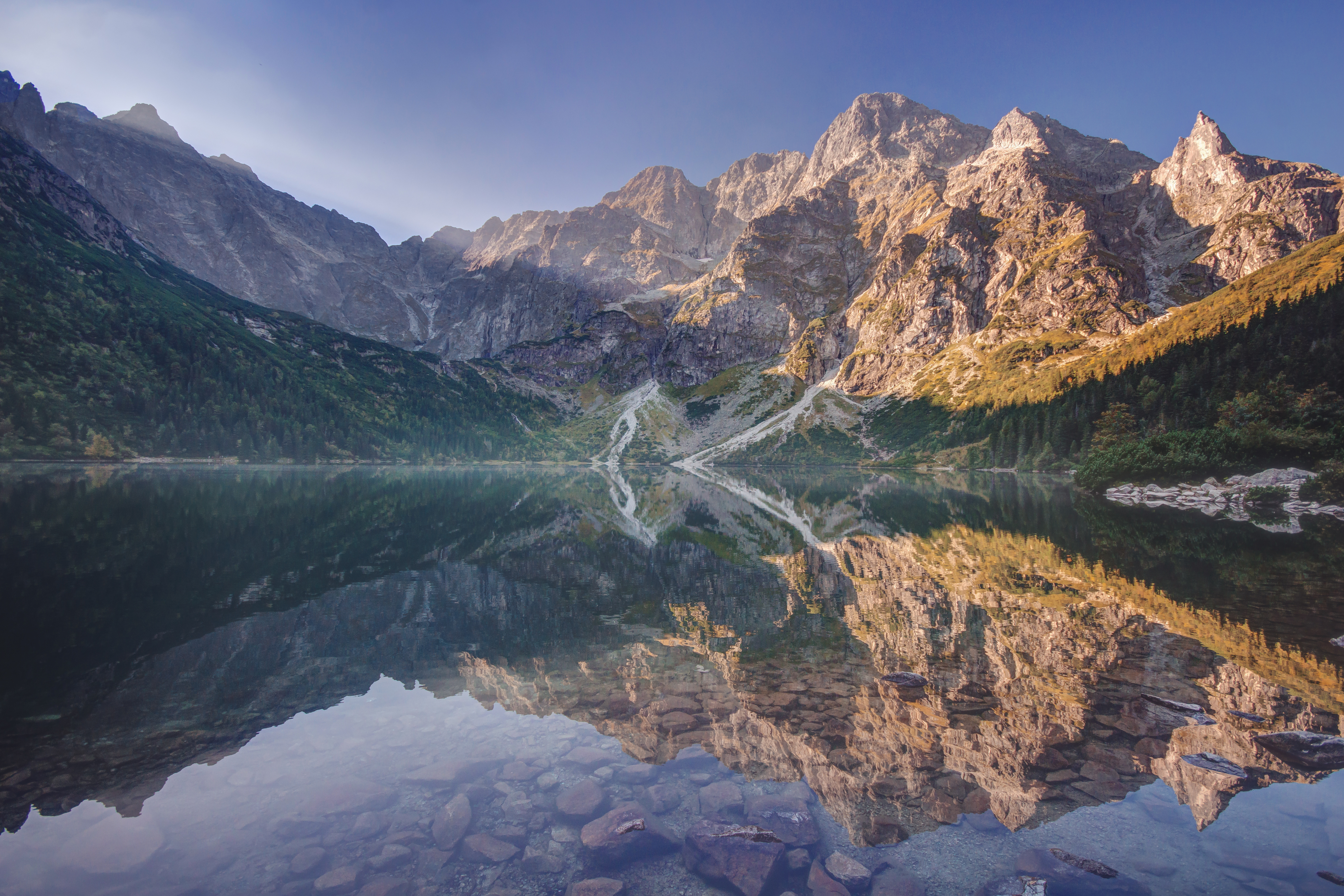
Morskie Oko at the foothill of Tatra Mountains in southern Poland which average 2,000 metres (6,600 ft) in elevation

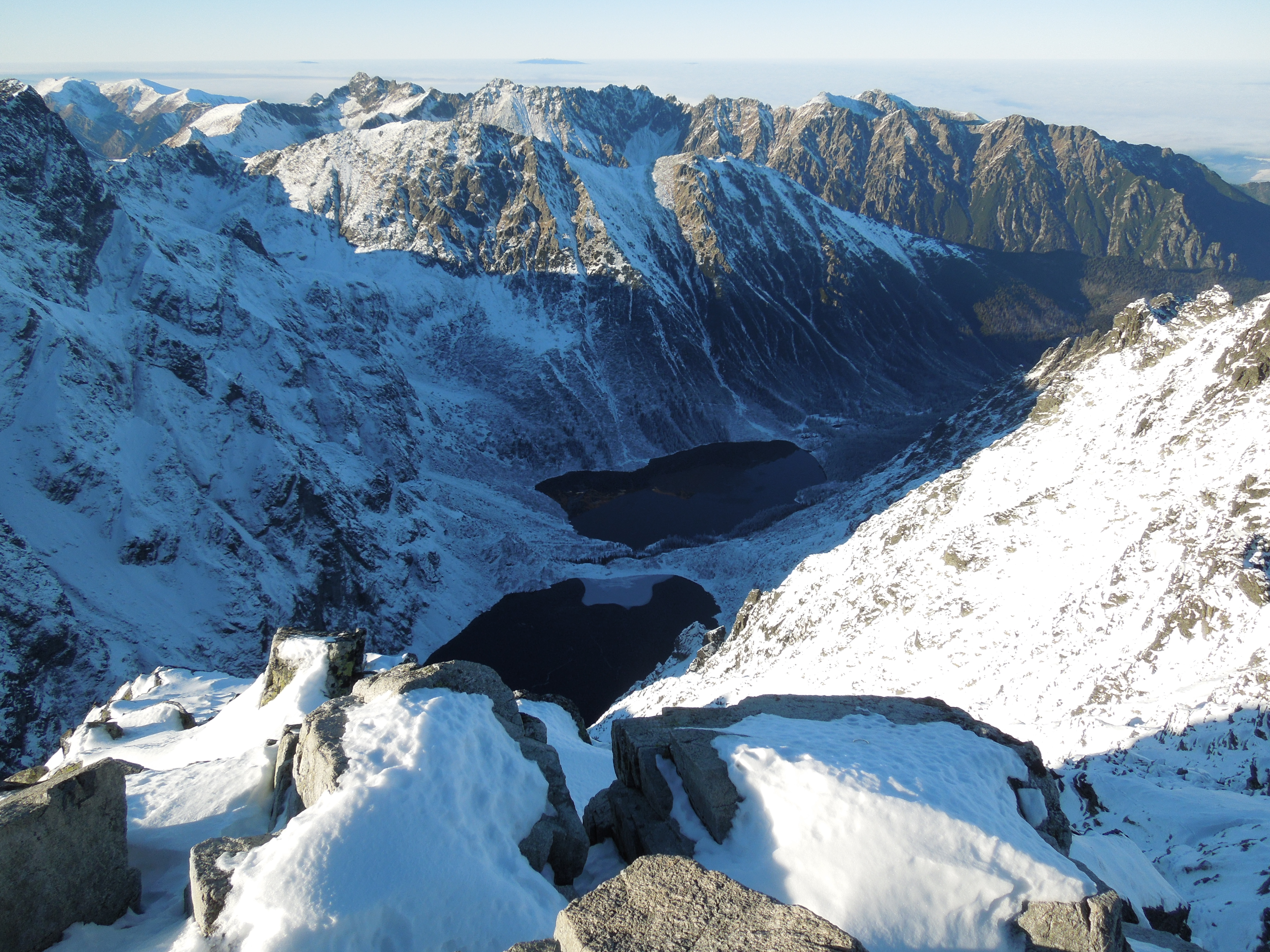
View from Rysy to Czarny Staw pod Rysami and Morskie Oko

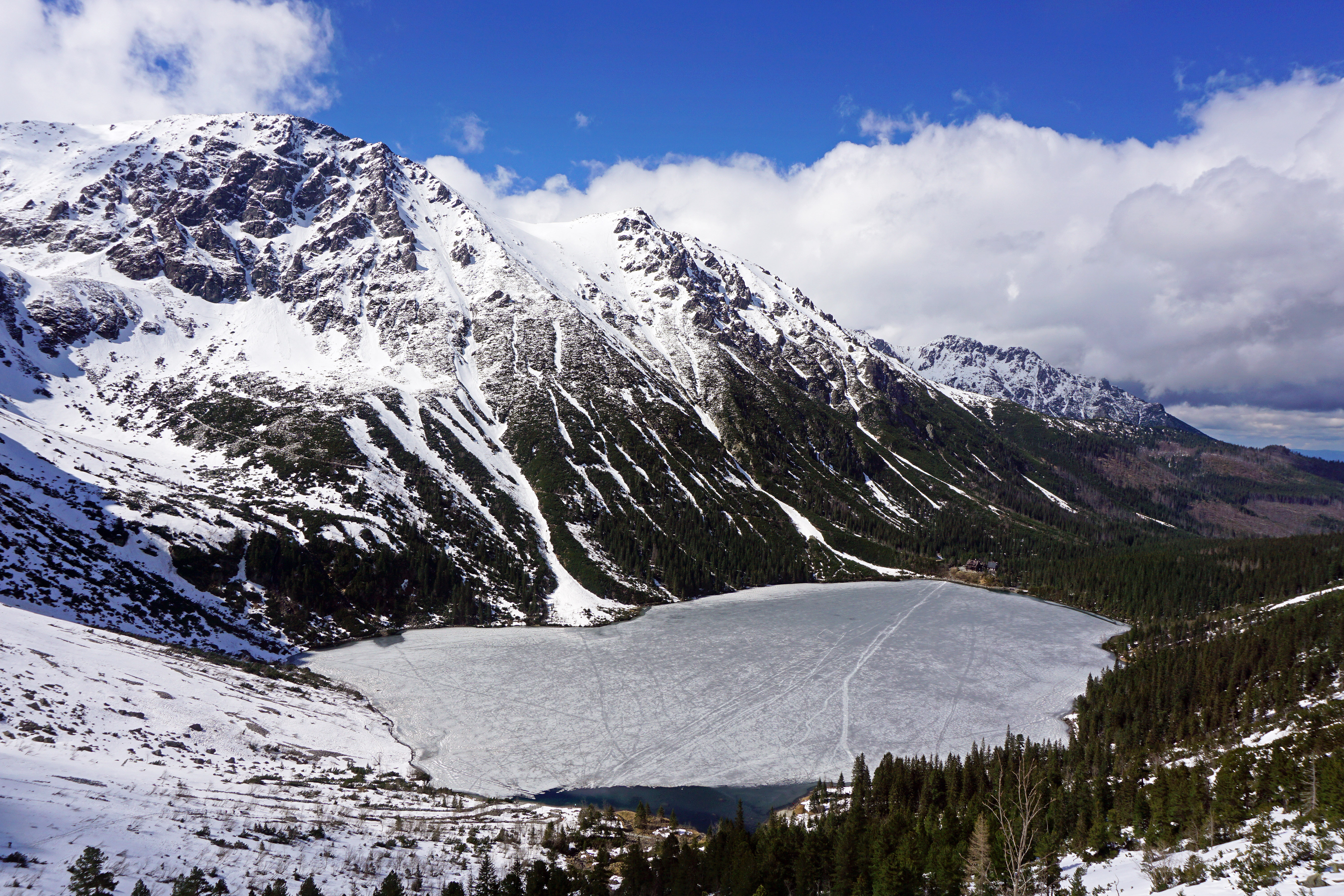
Morskie Oko in May 2019.

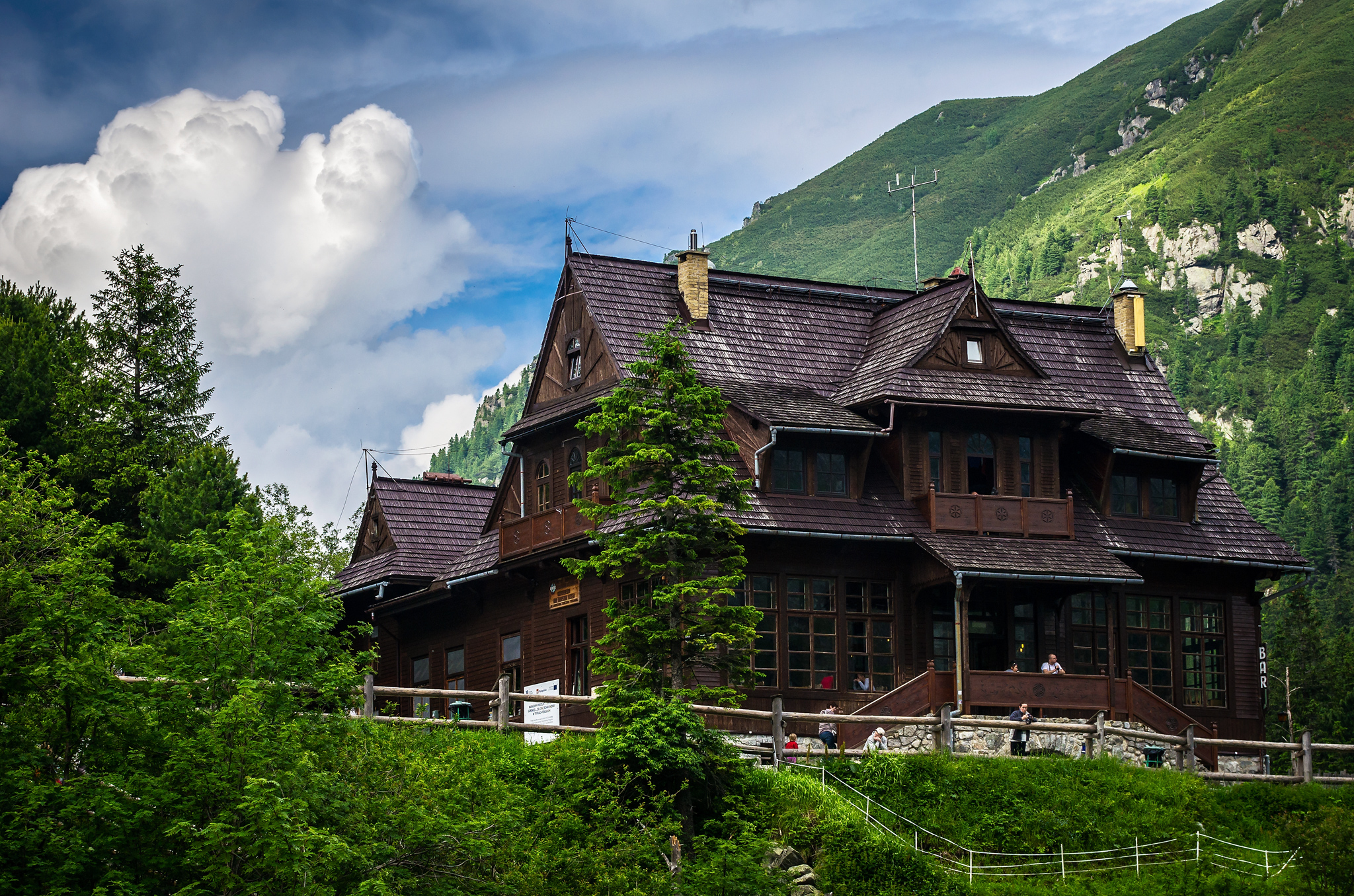
PTTK mountain chalet by the lake

== See also ==
- Czarny Staw pod Rysami
- Lakes in Poland
