= List of extreme points of Poland =

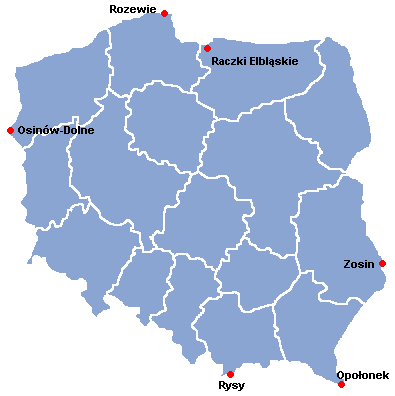
Extreme points of Poland

This is a list of the extreme points of Poland, the points that are farther north, south, east or west than any other location in Poland.

== Latitude and longitude ==
- Northernmost point: 54.835563°N 18.302937°E
  A beach in Jastrzębia Góra, near the town Władysławowo, Pomeranian Voivodeship, marked by the "Northern Star" obelisk, near Cape Rozewie on the Baltic coast
- Southernmost point: 49.002063°N 22.859687°E
  Wołosate ridge, near mount Opołonek, Eastern Beskids mountains, Subcarpathian Voivodeship
- Easternmost point: 50.868813°N 24.145562°E
  Bug River, near Zosin, Hrubieszów County, Lublin Voivodeship
- Westernmost point: 52.839188°N 14.124562°E
  Oder River, near Osinów Dolny, West Pomeranian Voivodeship

== Elevation ==
- Highest point:
  Mount Rysy, north-western summit, High Tatra mountains, Lesser Poland Voivodeship 2,500 m (8,200 ft) (the highest summit of the Rysy 2,501 m (8,205 ft), is located in Slovakia)
- Lowest point:
  Marzęcino, Pomeranian Voivodeship (−2.2 m)

== Central point ==
For many years, the town of Piątek, Łódź Voivodeship has been claimed the "geometrical centre" (not the exact geographical centre) of Poland. In 2018, the exact locations of the geodetic center (centroid) of the whole territory of Poland has been marked in the village of Nowa Wieś, 16 km north-west from Piątek. Its coordinates are 52°11'27.95" N and 19°21'19.46" E.

== See also ==
- Geography of Poland
- Extreme points of Europe
- Extreme points of the European Union
