= Territory of Poland =

Territory of Poland may refer to:

- The geography of Poland
- The territorial evolution of Poland
