= Climate change in Poland =

Emissions, impacts and responses of Poland related to climate change

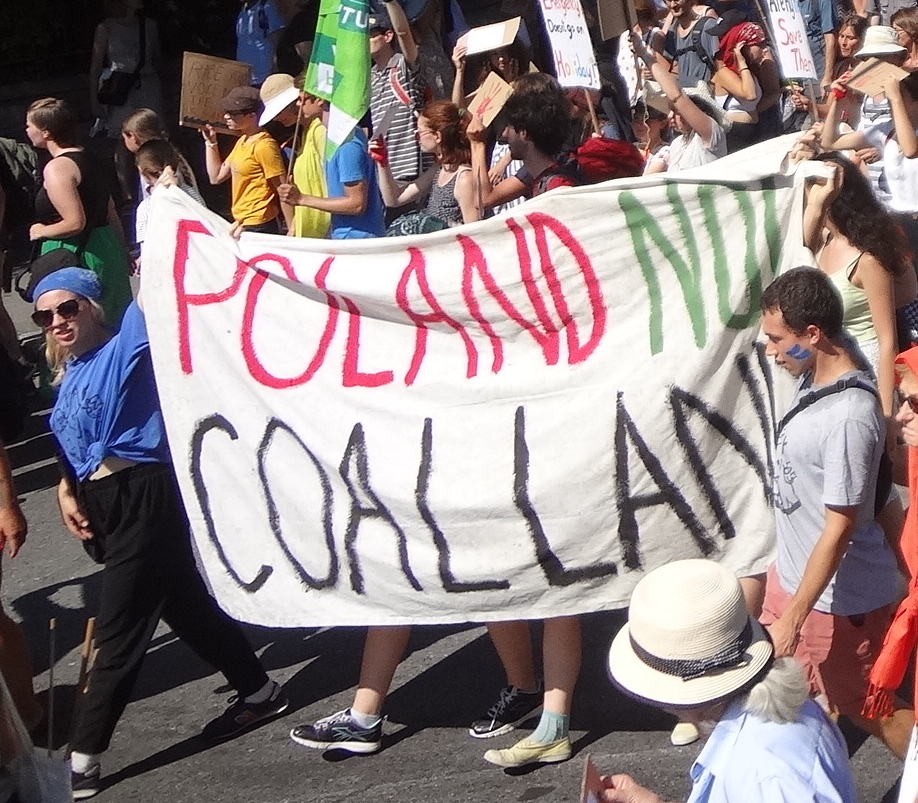
Poland not coal land

In Poland, climate change has resulted in an increase of average temperature above 2 degrees Celsius compared to preindustrial levels, which is higher than the average level of climate change in Europe. Temperature has been observed to increase over the last decades due to anthropogenic activity, and without significant reductions in greenhouse gas emissions the effects of climate change will become ever more noticeable.

Because of Poland's geographical location, climate effects are variably dispersed. Global warming has been observed to cause heat waves and other weather instabilities in Poland, which causes stress on ecosystems and human well-being. Changes in climate have been monitored by meteorological stations in Poland for over 100 years. In the last decades, the number of days with heavy rains increased, the number of days with snow cover decreased, and there has been an increased intensity of hurricanes, thunderstorms and similar weather events.

Floods and droughts are the main weather related challenges that Poland faces, and they are expected to become more frequent and intense in varying scenarios with predicted climate change. Agriculture and water management remain a major concern for the Polish Ministry of Environment.

== Greenhouse gas emissions ==
=== Energy consumption and sources ===
Poland's energy, according to the most recent statistics from 2021, is mainly derived from hard and brown coal and crude oil, which are fossil fuels and thus emit greenhouse gasses: they account for 69.2% of Poland's energy supply. Renewable energy carriers account for only 11.8% of the energy supply.

The national consumption of energy was 3 697.5 petajoules in 2021, and follows a slight upward trend in energy consumption that is discernible since the early 2000s. The largest share of direct energy consumption was held by the industry sector, and it amounted to 32.5%. This was followed by the transport sector (including privately owned cars), 27.0% and then households, 25.8%.

=== Historical emissions ===
The greenhouse gas emissions of Poland have decreased from their 1990 level. This is partly because of Poland's increased energy efficiency, but there was also a gradual shift towards the import and usage of natural gas; however, this was mostly Russian gas, and the 2022 Russian invasion of Ukraine and subsequent gas dispute has complicated the usage of this resource. Renewable sources such as solar and off-shore wind power are slowly gaining importance in Poland's energy supply.

== Impacts on the natural environment ==
=== Temperature and weather changes ===
Köppen climate classification map for Poland for 1980–2016

2071–2100 map under the most intense climate change scenario. Mid-range scenarios are currently considered more likely

==== Observed thermal climate changes ====
The climate of Poland is generally becoming warmer and cloudier, due to climate change and to changes in atmospheric circulation.

Since the mid-1900s, Poland's average temperature has risen 0.29 degrees per decade. In sum, temperature increased by just over 2 °C. Observed warming in the last 3 decades is connected to global temperature increases; however, in the last two decades, the country has been warming faster than the world on average.

Climate change in Poland has manifested through significant increases in average, maximum, and minimum annual and seasonal air temperatures, an increasing number of hot days, and a decreasing number of frosty days. A decrease in the number of weather types in a year indicates that the weather varies less in the year.

Temperature increases have been stronger in the eastern and western parts of Poland than in the center. The greatest temperature rise (more than 2.1 °C) occurred in the Lake Districts and the weakest one (almost 1.8 °C) in the Sudety Mountains (NC8BR5).

==== Predicted thermal climate changes ====
Poland's average temperature is projected to continue to rise throughout this century. An upward trend is discernible in mean temperature both in near and far future and for RCP 4,5 and RCP 8,5 climate projections. While hotter days are expected to become hotter, they will also be more frequent, increasing the chances of long lasting heat waves. The number of days above 25 °C is predicted to rise substantially from 29 days per year in the 2001-2010 period to 52 days in 2071–2090. Meanwhile, frost periods and days (minimum temperature below 0 °C) will decrease throughout the century. Such thermal changes will be more pronounced in the far future, and they depend on the levels of global mitigation and subsequent global warming (as can be seen in the scenario's made by the Intergovernmental Panel on Climate Change, RCP 4,5 and RCP 8,5). Frost days in Poland are predicted to decrease from 102 days per year in 2001–2010 to 65 days in 2071–2090.

==== Change in precipitation ====
Global climate change is accompanied by other climate variabilities, as in change of annual sums of precipitation, and changes in air and oceanic circulation patterns. The annual total precipitation is slightly increasing, yet changes are small and not statistically significant Noteworthy are the changes in the monthly and seasonal rainfall distribution, as well as regional/ spatial variabilities. Significant increases of precipitation have been observed during autumn and winter months, especially in March, while summer precipitation is decreasing. The observed changes of precipitation vary regionally, since precipitation in Poland displays a great spatial variety and dependence on hypsometry. In southeastern Poland there is a downward trend in the total precipitation during spring, summer and winter, while winter precipitation is increasing in northern Poland. The precipitation frequency (expressed by the number of days with precipitation) is increasing annually and above the long-term normal in northern- and western Poland.

Days of snow cover follows a negative trend, in hand with warmer winters, and snow cover frequency is expected to decrease over time.

=== Sea level rise ===
A recent study by Poland's national research institute shows that the sea level in Poland has been steadily rising, with 2020 levels being 13–15 centimetres (5.1–5.9 in) higher than 1950 levels.

=== Ecosystems and biodiversity ===
Ecosystems and biodiversity are influenced both by a changing climate and by human intervention in ecosystems. A changing climate can cause certain habitats in Poland to shift and change in temperature or water regime. This causes for example the disappearance of Poland's raised mires, transition mires and salt marshes. These effects of climate change are often augmented and supplemented by human-induced habitat transformation and habitat loss. According to the Convention on Biological Diversity, "the main threat to biodiversity is anthropocentric"; these threats include for instance air pollution damaging coniferous forest reproduction, hillside deforestation that causes degradation of riverbanks and their populations, and the reclamation of swamp lands that reduces alder habitats.

Moreover, they state that "a serious problem in Poland is the expansion of new alien species that pose a threat to native species." Alien, invasive species pose a threat to existing, native species. Examples of invasive species are the American mink (Neovison vison), small balsam (Impatiens parviflora), or the pumpkinseed (Lepomis gibbosus). Since the introduction of the American mink, several species of water birds and semi-aquatic mammals have decreased. Where changes in mean temperature and precipitation could mean a setback to native populations, it could be beneficial to invasive species, such as the pumpkinseed fish that thrives in warmer water. Advancing invasive species are especially dangerous in national parks, where native flora and fauna is otherwise more or less protected from anthropocentric influence. Although natural reserves often have a stronger natural ecosystem and thus are more resilient to invading non-native species, they are also of greater importance to retain biodiversity; this makes a successful invasive species in those area's more dangerous to the Polish ecosystem. Small balsam is the most common invasive species found in Poland's national parks. Poland's national reserves also suffer from excessive tourism, and both that and invasive species are a factor in the destruction of Poland's small-scale habitats.

== Impacts on people ==
=== Impacts on livelihoods ===
The effects of climate changes are evident in people's daily lives; these include but are not limited to changes in bioclimatic stress, changes in conditions for recreation, and economical effects; for example, the improvement of thermal agricultural conditions, and changes in energy demand for heating buildings, air conditioning and refrigeration.

The main threats of climate change in Poland involve changes in water balance, decrease in agricultural yields, increased frequency of extreme weather, increased forest fire risk, loss of biodiversity, and accelerated soil erosion. Further risks of biosphere and ecosphere alterations depend on future global warming and ecological feedback effects.

=== Impact on energy demand and security ===
Poland's ongoing dependency on fossil fuel will not only contribute to global climate change, but will also become more expensive as the price for CO_{2} allowances continues to rise

Climate change, and more specifically global warming, will also affect Poland's energy consumption. So-called "heating degree days", where a lot of energy is consumed heating up buildings, will decrease, and thus also decrease energy consumption. This could, however, be countered by an increase in demand for air-conditioning and refrigerating on warmer days.

These altered demand patterns are likely to affect the reliability of Poland's energy systems in the summer. Lower winter consumption and more days of heat waves will cause less energy generation capacity. Without a synchronization of seasonal energy consumption and the launch of new generation capacity (renewable resources) to meet summer demands, Poland's energy supply will be more unstable. A dependence on only a few energy sources, accompanied by the altered demand patterns will likely lead to rising fuel prices. Fuel prices are likely to affect food and commodity prices, as is already the case with the Ukrainian war and the subsequent rising energy prices and increasing inflation.

In the context of more extreme and unpredictable weather events, heavy precipitation, floods and storms will affect the reliability of the energy system concerning its capacity to provide for future households, companies and general public consumption.

=== Water scarcity ===
Changes in water balance, such as increased variability of precipitation and evaporation, and lack of snow cover in winter and low water levels in rivers, will lead to diminished ground water levels over time. Increased frequency of disruptive weather phenomena, such as hurricanes, flooding and long periods of drought will have disruptive effects on many aspects of life and society; cause water supply deficit and damage on water supply systems. Water supply deficit will become a limiting factor for agricultural production and forestry.

=== Agricultural insecurities ===
The agricultural sector in Poland is of high economic and social importance. Compared to other countries in Europe, Poland has the highest number of inhabitants who are professionally active in agriculture.

Agriculture is heavily affected by climatic conditions, especially increases in temperature and changes in precipitation and weather extremes, such as drought and heavy precipitation. Global warming is predicted to lead to improved thermal agricultural conditions and accelerated sowing and harvest conditions in the region.

Seasonal thermal variabilities depend on the future time horizon and warming scenario. Unstable weather, floods and droughts involve several agricultural insecurities. Droughts and heavy rainfall will affect crop growth, cause soil moisture anomalies and crop failure. Qualitative and quantitative changes in soil moisture are likely to affect spring cereals, leading to decreased potato and maize yield. Increased temperatures accompanied with extreme weather events involve higher vulnerability to water scarcity and agricultural insecurity, as "adapting crops to climate change can be difficult and uncertain". Periods of drought and extreme winds further imply increased risk of forest fires and wildfires, biodiversity loss, and losses of forest stands.

=== Socio-economic insecurities ===
Extreme weather events, such as the combination of flooding events and strong winds cause material damage to infrastructure and territories. In the study made by the Polish Institute of Environmental Protection – National Research Institute, the total value of losses caused by extreme events in the years 2012–2016 was estimated at PLN 36.5 billion at prices in 2015. While heavy rains and increased flooding have been observed to increase over the last 8 years threatening homes and livelihoods,(clientearth) drought conditions are on the rise, increasing the risk of wildfires and peatland degradation. With increased global warming, loss and damage is expected to increase.

Vulnerability to climate change varies between socio economic sectors. Some are directly affected, such as eco-tourism and agriculture (Clientearth). Climate induced changes in agricultural yields will likely cause rising food prices.

As global climate change progresses, many places in the world are becoming uninhabitable because of extreme weather events and other climate impacts. Climate displacements will force migrants to seek refuge in Poland and other parts of Europe over the next decades.

=== Impacts on health ===
Human life and health will be affected by changes in conditions for recreation, climate related psychological stress, such as anxiety and depression, and changes in bioclimatic stress, such as decrease in bioclimatic cold stress and increase in bioclimatic heat stress. Extreme weather, such as rain storms and heat waves, endanger human life and health. High temperatures contribute to deaths from cardiovascular and respiratory diseases.

Future challenges involve the polish health system dealing with increased exposure to extreme weather events, but also diseases not yet occurring in our climate zone. A change in the boundaries of the climate zones enhance the risk of pathogens appearing in the environment, as the development and range of species transmitting viruses and bacteria, leading to higher risk of vector-borne diseases. A longer growing season will enhance the exposure to pollen and the risks related to allergens have been observed to increase.

Invasive species such as the Caucasian giant hogweeds (Heracleum sosnowskyi Manden and Heracleum mantegazzianum Sommier et Lever) have been introduced by humans, and can now be found all over Poland. Their sap can cause phototoxity, chemical burns and long-lasting dermatitis.

== Mitigation and adaptation ==
=== International cooperation ===
As Poland has been a part of the European Union since 2004, the most recent UNFCCC Paris Agreement was signed by them as an EU member state. They also signed and ratified the earlier Kyoto Protocol. In 2018, Poland hosted the Conference of the Parties (COP 24) of the UN Framework Convention on Climate Change. The EU has its own European Climate Law, which states that by 2050 the EU will need to be carbon neutral. An in-between target has been set for a 55% reduction of CO_{2} emissions by 2030; this would mean that Poland has to lower their CO_{2} emissions by 7% in 2030, though a proposal is now pending which would increase this lowered amount to 17%.

=== Mitigation of greenhouse gas emissions ===
Poland's national strategy to adhere to both the Paris Agreement and the Kyoto Protocol is incorporated in their eighth National communication for the UNFCCC, and adheres to the climate policy of the European Union. This includes participating in the efforts to achieve the EU joint reduction target of 20% compared to 1990, through EU climate and energy package, the emission trading system, or ETS. The greenhouse gas emissions covered by the ETS are greenhouse gasses emitted by the energy sector, district heating and industrial plants. Non-EU ETS sectors were reported and accounted for by the particular EU Member States individually. The EU legislation obliges Poland to reduce their greenhouse gas emissions by 14% compared to 2005 levels. The climate policy of the EU also provides Poland with an annual emission limit; if Poland does not exceed this limit, as has not been done in the years 2013–2020, the surplus emission rights can be used or banked the next year.

=== Adaptation strategies ===
In the years 2012–2013, the IOŚ-PIB (Institute of Environmental Protection in Poland- National Research institute) carried out the KLIMADA Project – Development and implementation of the Polish National Strategy for Adaptation to Climate Change. The national adaptation strategy (NAS 2020) set goals for 2020, possibly 2030, to implement actions that respond to the challenges to achieve economic growth within the use of environmental resources and adaptation to climate change. Development policy was established by the following sectors: water management, agriculture, energy, transport services, cities and construction, health, coastal zone, mountain areas, biodiversity and ecosystems, and forests.

Adaption plans have been in place since 2013, but the Polish Ministry of Environment lacks strategies to implement them. The limitations to implementation remains a lack of coordination and cooperation, according to the environmental agency. Experts say that an update of the 2013 adaption plan could help overcome these problems.

The main outcomes of adaptation so far involves developing projects tied to urban green development and to water management. However, action in rural areas and agriculture is still insignificant, as the role of biodiversity preservation and rehabilitation is undervalued. More adaptation strategies, research and action are needed to combat the risks of extreme weather events, tied to increasing temperatures in the future.

==== Criticisms of Polish climate policy ====
Polish climate policy has been heavily criticised in the past, with the country having been called the "least climate ambitious" EU member state. Of all the participating countries, only Poland, Ireland and Romania have not submitted a long-term strategy to meet the Paris Agreement pledge made by all members of the European Union.

==== Activism ====
An awareness of the importance of taking action to combat climate change has increased substantially in the last ten years. 53% of the Poles consider climate change a "very serious problem", according to a 2020 survey, in comparison with 19% in 2015. March 2019 saw the Młodzieżowy Strajk Klimatyczny (MSK), or Youth Climate Strike, where young people protested for climate justice, inspired by the school strikes of Greta Thunberg in Sweden. Other climate activist groups include a Polish branch of Extinction Rebellion, which is a world-wide climate change activist group; the Global Catholic Climate Movement; and Obóz dla Klimatu (The Camp for the Climate), a group of Polish origin.

One form of climate action is the lawsuit made by Client Earth on behalf of five Polish citizens against the Polish state in 2021; the status hereof is still pending.
