= Raczki Elbląskie =

- Village
- Location within Poland
- Coordinates: 54°7′25″N 19°22′52″E
- Country: Poland
- Voivodeship: Warmian-Masurian
- County: Elbląg
- Gmina: Elbląg
- Population: 170

Raczki Elbląskie [ˈrat͡ʂki ɛlˈblɔ̃skʲɛ] is a village in the administrative district of Gmina Elbląg, within Elbląg County, Warmian-Masurian Voivodeship, located in northern Poland. It is situated approximately 4 km (2 mi) northwest of Elbląg and 83 km (52 mi) northwest of the regional capital, Olsztyn.

Raczki Elbląskie was until 2022 considered the lowest point in Poland, situated 1.8 metres (5.9 ft) below sea level – in fact, later studies shown that Marzęcino is situated 2.2 metres (7.2 ft) below sea level
