= Marzęcino =

- Village
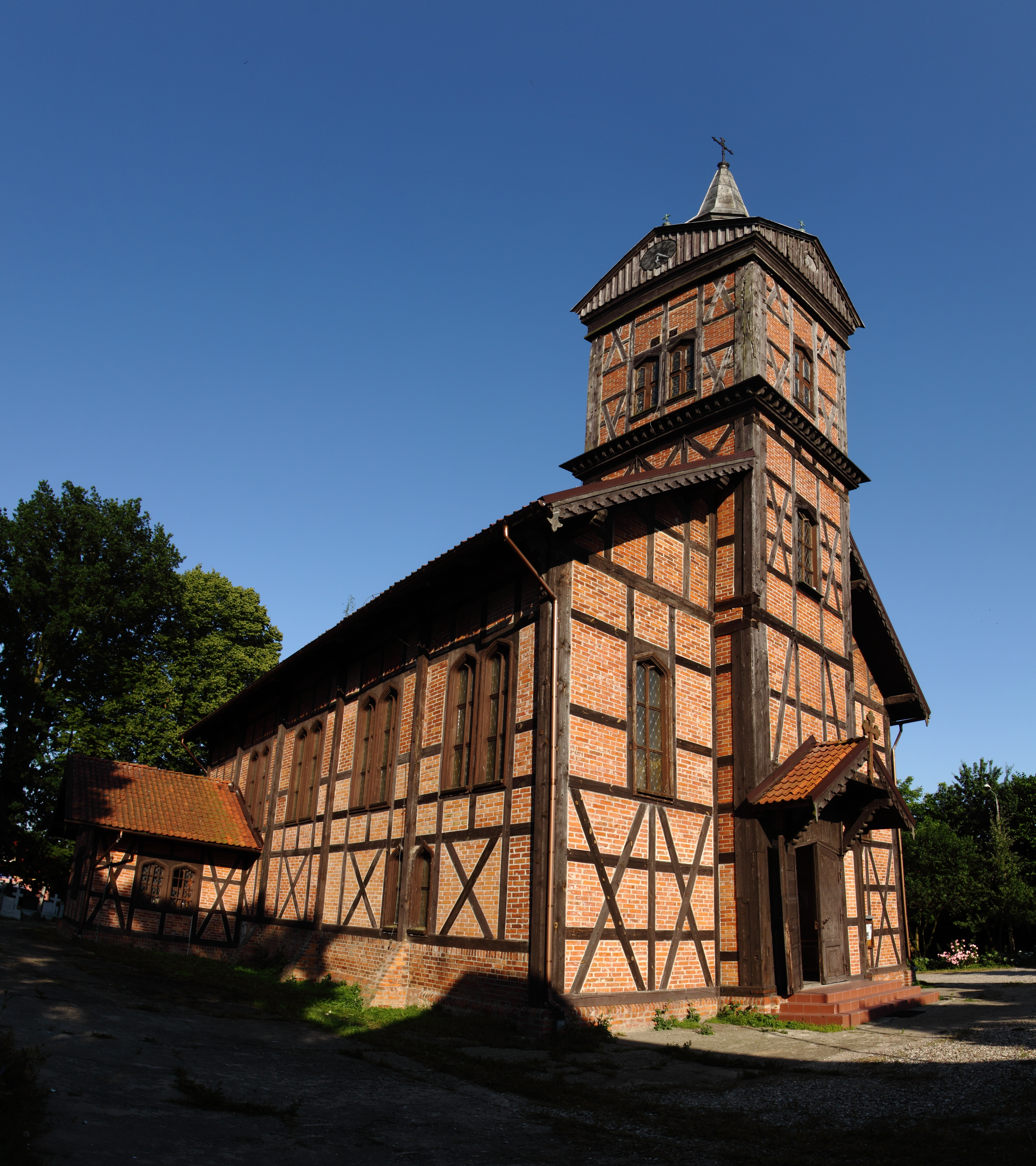
- Local timber frame church

- Location within Poland
- Coordinates: 54°14′9″N 19°13′54″E
- Country: Poland
- Voivodeship: Pomeranian
- County: Nowy Dwór
- Gmina: Nowy Dwór Gdański
- Elevation: −2.2 m (−7.2 ft)
- Population: 700

Marzęcino ([maʐɛnˈt͡ɕinɔ]; German: Jungfer) is a village in the administrative district of Gmina Nowy Dwór Gdański, within Nowy Dwór County, Pomeranian Voivodeship, in northern Poland.

Marzęcino is the lowest point in Poland, situated on 2.2 metres (7.2 ft) below sea level (previously Raczki Elbląskie was considered the lowest point).
