= Karel Domin =

Czech botanist and politician

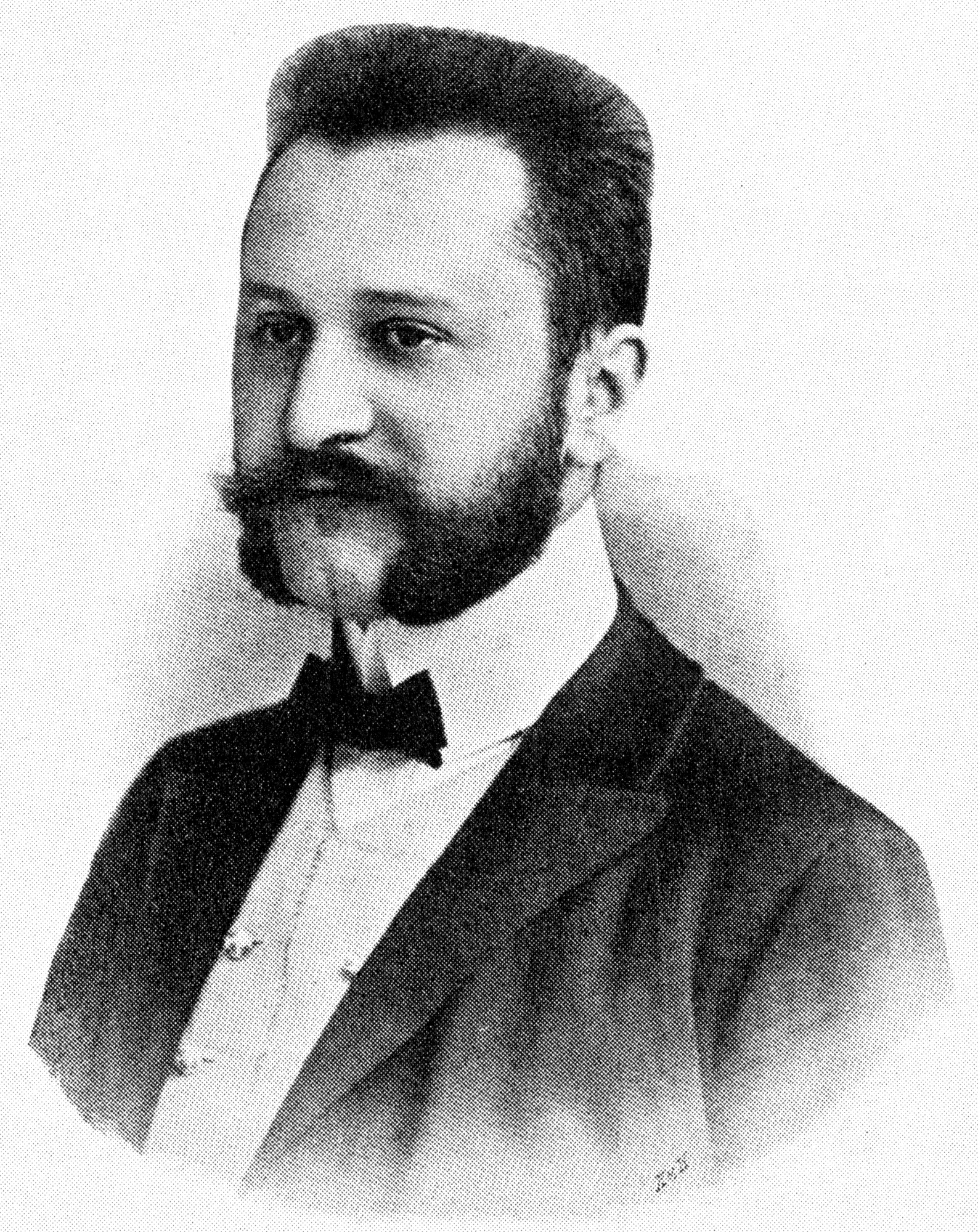
- Born: 4 May 1882; Kutná Hora, Kingdom of Bohemia, Austria-Hungary
- Died: 10 June 1953 (aged 71); Prague, Czechoslovakia
- Resting place: Vyšehrad Cemetery
- Scientific career
- Fields: Botany
- Author abbrev. (botany): Domin

Signature
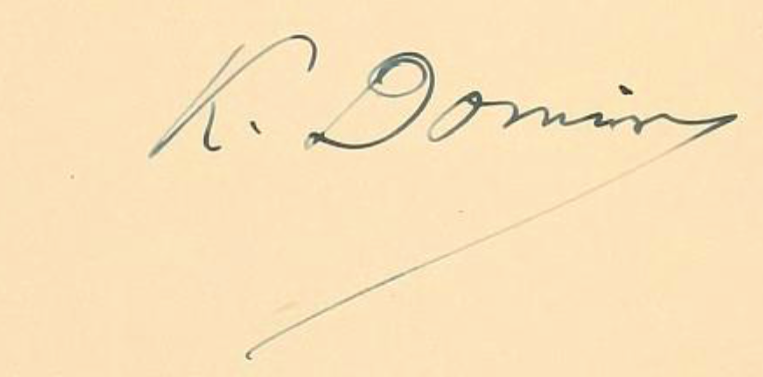

Karel Domin (4 May 1882 – 10 June 1953) was a Czech botanist and politician.

== Biography ==
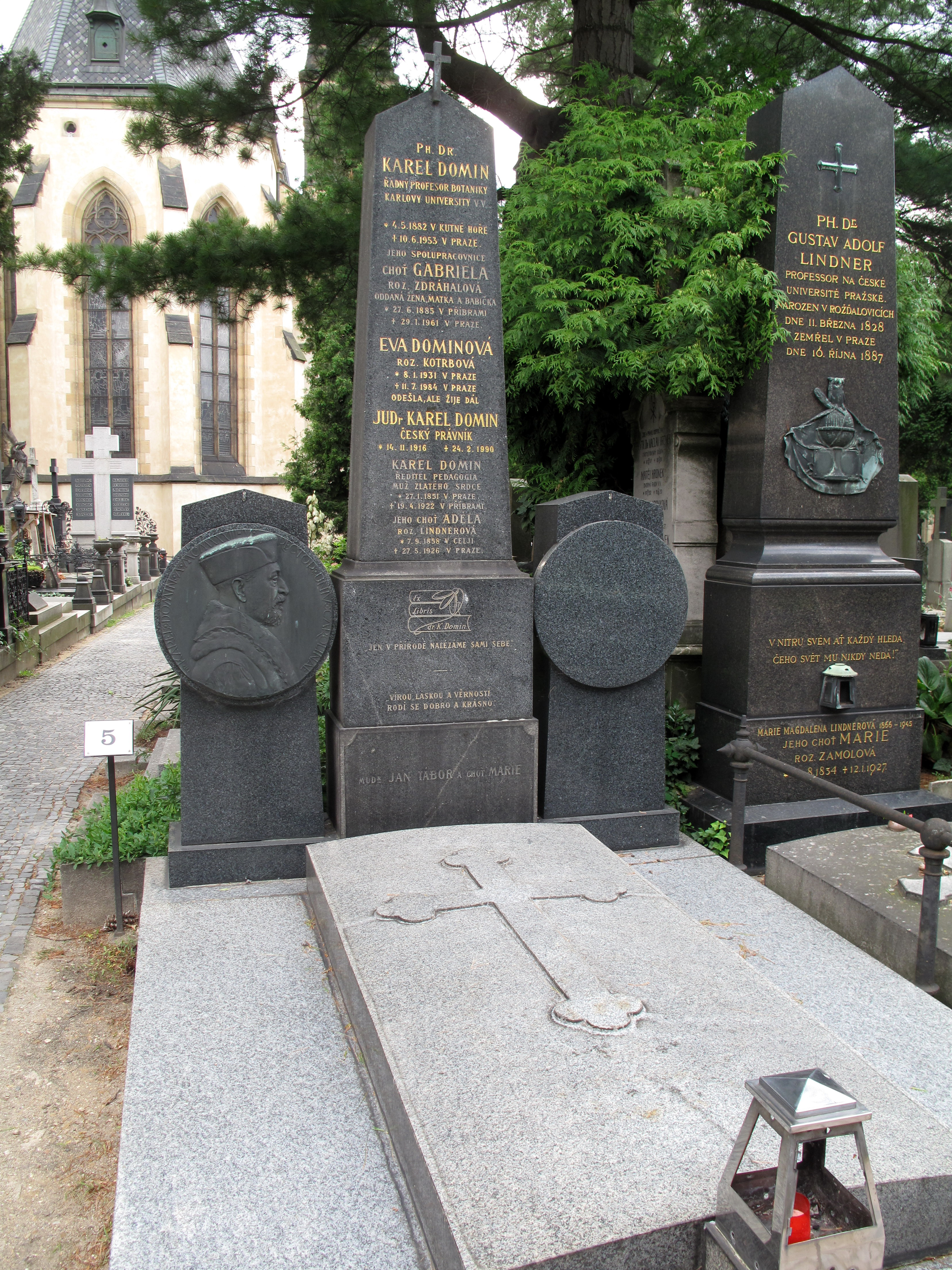
Domin's grave, Vyšehrad Cemetery

Domin was born on 4 May 1882, Kutná Hora, Kingdom of Bohemia, Austria-Hungary. After gymnasium school studies in Příbram, he studied botany at the Charles University in Prague, and graduated in 1906. Between 1911 and 1913 he published several important articles on Australian taxonomy. In 1916 he was named as professor of botany. Domin specialised in phytogeography, geobotany and plant taxonomy. He became a member at the Czechoslovak Academy of Sciences, published many scientific works and founded a botany institute at the university. The Domin scale, a commonly used means of classifying a standard area by the number of plant species found in that area, is named after him. Domin edited the exsiccata series Flora Čechoslovenica exsiccata (1929–1936) together with Vladimír Krajina.

In the academic year 1933–34 he was rector of Charles University and was one of the participants of a struggle for ancient academic insignia between the Czech and German universities of Prague (the insigniáda) that resulted in street-fights and looting. From 1935 to 1939, he was a member of parliament; after the Munich Agreement, he co-founded a traditionalist political movement (Akce národní obrody).

He is considered the man who is the most responsible for the creation of Tatra National Park.

He died on 10 June 1953 in Prague.
