= Tatra National Park =

Tatra National Park is the name for two different national parks located in the Tatra Mountains:

- Tatra National Park, Poland (Tatrzański Park Narodowy)
- Tatra National Park, Slovakia (Tatranský národný park)
