= Tatra National Park, Slovakia =

National Park in Slovakia

Tatra National Park Tatranský národný park
- IUCN category II (national park)
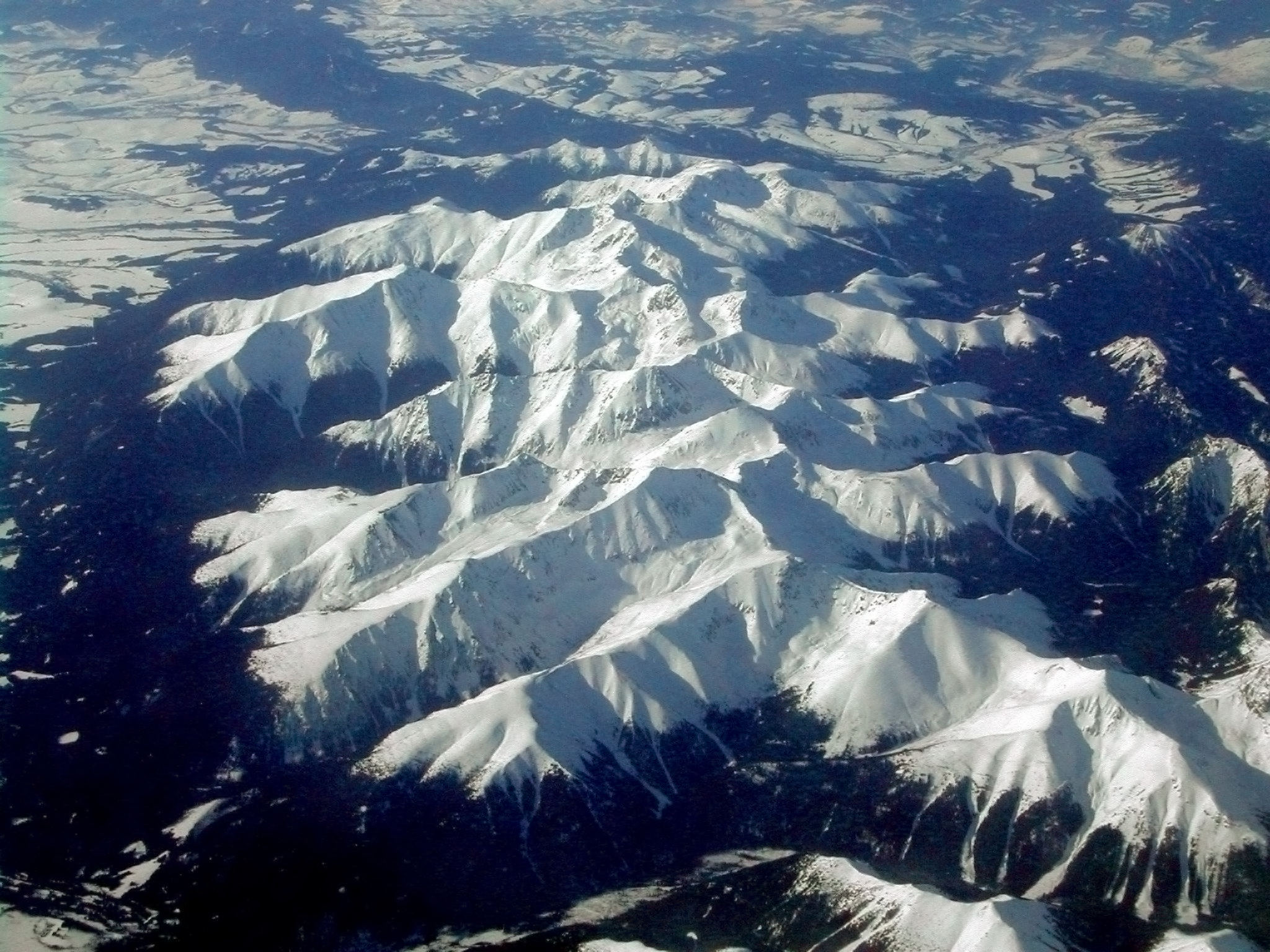
- Western Tatras Park logo with the Tatra chamois
- Interactive map of Tatra National Park; Tatranský národný park
- Location: Tatra Mountains, North Central Slovakia
- Coordinates: 49°10′49″N 19°55′10″E
- Area: 738 km^{2} (285 sq mi)(284.9 mi^{2})
- Established: 1 January 1949
- Governing body: Správa Tatranského národného parku (The administration of the Tatra National Park)

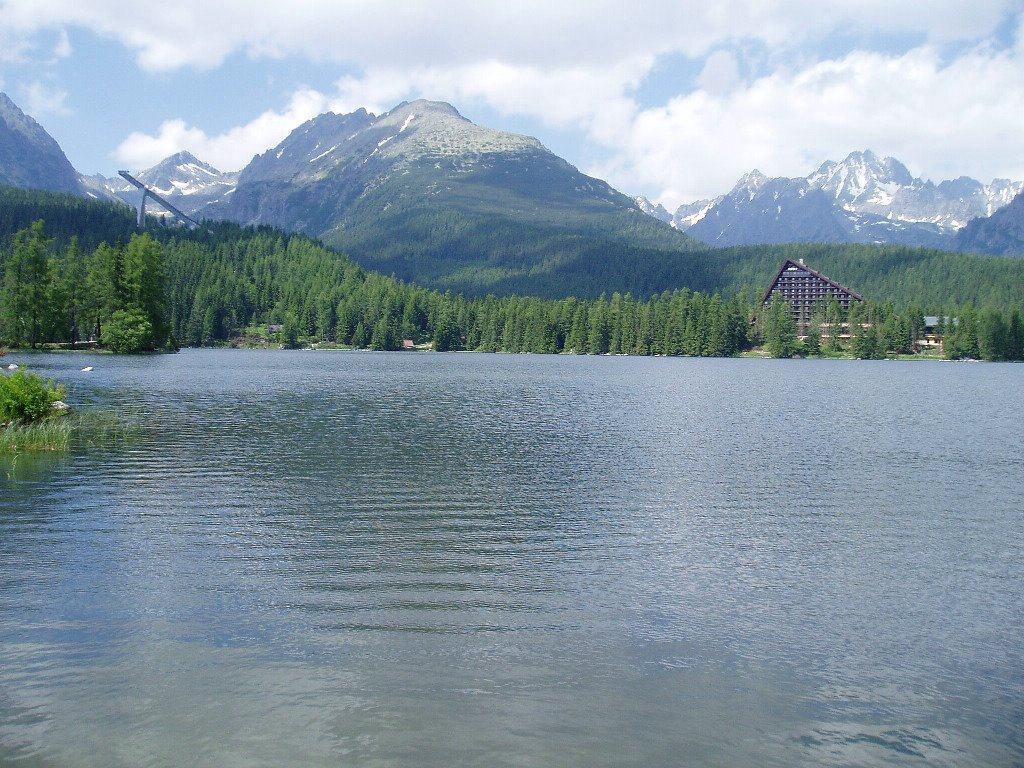
Štrbské pleso lake, with the High Tatras in the background.

Tatra(s) National Park (Slovak: Tatranský národný park; abbr. TANAP) is one of the nine national parks in Slovakia. It is situated in North Central Slovakia in the Tatra Mountains. The park is important for protecting a diverse variety of flora and fauna, with many endemic species, including the Tatra chamois.

The Tatra Mountains form a natural border between Slovakia to the south and Poland to the north, and both countries have cooperated since the early 20th century on efforts to protect the area. Poland created an adjoining national park, and UNESCO later designated the combined effort a transboundary biosphere reserve.

== Geography ==
The Tatra National Park protects the Slovak areas of the High Tatras mountain range in the Eastern Tatras (Východné Tatry) ranges, and areas of the Western Tatras (Západné Tatry) ranges. The west part of the Tatra National Park is situated in the Žilina Region and the east part in the Prešov Region.

The national park covers an area of 738 km^{2} (284.9 mi^{2}), and the buffer zone around the park covers an area of 307 km^{2} (118.5 mi^{2}); 1045 km^{2} together. The park offers 600 km of hiking trails and 16 marked and maintained bike trails.

=== Mountains ===
The Western Tatras are divided into Osobitá, Roháče, Sivý vrch (literally Grey Mountain), Liptovské Tatry (Liptov Tatras), Liptovské Kopy, Červené vrchy (Red Peaks). The Eastern Tatras consist of High Tatras (Vysoké Tatry) and Belianske Tatras (Belianske Tatry).

The highest peak in Slovakia at 2,655 metres (8,711 ft) in elevation, Gerlachovský štít, is located within the park. It is also the highest point in the Tatra Mountains and the Carpathian Mountains. Bystrá is the highest mountain in the Western Tatras at 2,248 metres (7,375 ft), and Havran mountain (English: Raven) is the highest point in the Belianske Tatras at 2,152 metres (7,060 ft).

=== Lakes and streams ===
There are more than a hundred tarns, or mountain lakes, in the park. Veľké Hincovo pleso is the biggest with an area of 0.2 km^{2}, and the deepest at 58 metres (190 ft).

The area around the settlement of Štrbské Pleso is a drainage divide for two drainage basins. To the east of this divide, streams are the headwaters of the Poprad River, of the Baltic Sea drainage basin. To the west of the divide streams are tributaries of the Váh, of the Black Sea drainage basin. The most popular waterfalls include Studenovodské vodopády, Kmeťov vodopád, Vajanského vodopád, Roháčsky vodopád, and Vodopád Skok.

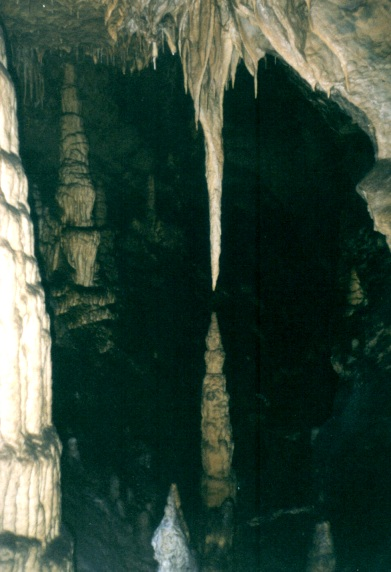
Belianska Cave

=== Caves ===
About 300 caves are located within the national park, however Belianska Cave (Belianska jaskyňa) is the only one open to public. It is located near the village of Lendak.

The longest cave system discovered to date is the Cave of Javorinka.

== Park history ==
Tatra National Park was established on 1 January 1949 and it is the oldest national park in Slovakia. In 1987, a section of the Western Tatras was added to the national park.

In 1992 the national park became a part of the UNESCO Man and the Biosphere Programme, jointly with the adjoining Tatra National Park of Poland.

The areas of the park and its buffer zone were adjusted in 2003. Since 2004, the national park belongs to the Natura 2000 ecological network.

== Ecology and biota ==
The geological composition, soil properties and climate conditions all contribute to the original flora and fauna in the park.

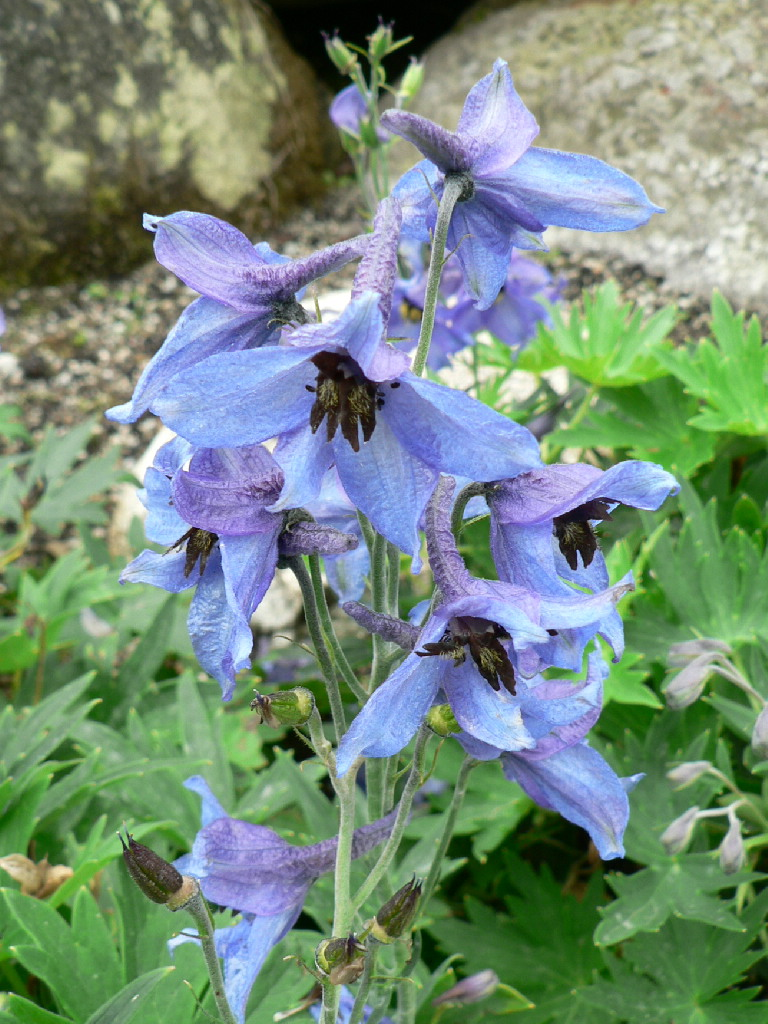
Endemic Delphinium oxysepalum.

=== Flora ===
Almost two thirds of the park are covered with forests, mainly with spruce and Norway spruce (Picea abies). The most widespread tree is the Norway spruce, followed by the Scots pine, Swiss pine (Pinus cembra), European larch (Larix decidua), and mountain pine. Leafy trees, especially maples, mainly grow in the Belianske Tatras.

About 1,300 species of vascular plants grow in the park, of which 37 are endemic to the Tatras, 41 are endemic to the Western Carpathians and 57 are endemic to the Carpathians. Notable plants endemic to the Tatras include Tatra scurvy-grass (Cochlearia tatrae), yellow mountain saxifrage (Saxifraga aizoides), Erysimum wahlenbergii of the wallflower genus, Cochlearia tatrae, Erigeron hungaricus of the genus Erigeron, and others. Ice age relicts include Ranunculus alpestris of the genus Ranunculus, glacier crowfoot, Dianthus glacialis of the genus Dianthus, Gentiana frigida of the gentian genus, Primula minim of the genus Primula, yellow mountain saxifrage, dwarf willow, net-leaved willow (Salix reticulata), and others.

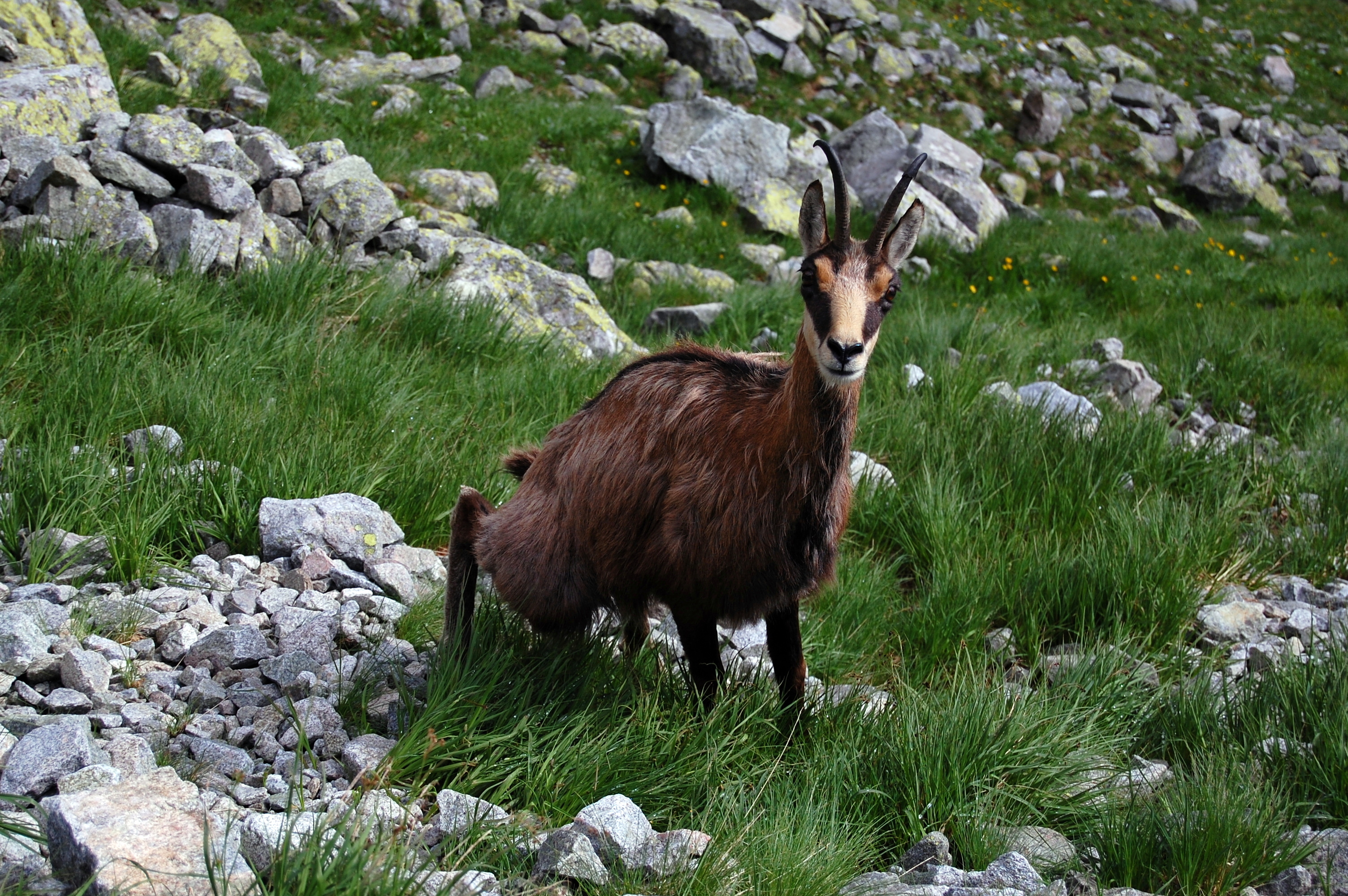
Endemic Tatra chamois, a goat—antelope.

=== Fauna ===
Animals are represented by 115 species of birds, 42 mammals, 8 reptiles, and 3 amphibians. There are also many invertebrates. Notable ice age relicts are Branchinecta paludosa fairy shrimp, the three-toed woodpecker, ring ouzel, spotted nutcracker, and others.

Mammals in the park include the endemic Tatra chamois (Rupicapra rupicapra tatrica), a unique goat—antelope that is an IUCN critically endangered species. Other mammals include the Eurasian brown bear, Eurasian lynx, marten, wolf, fox, Alpine marmot and the Tatra marmot.

== See also ==
- Tatra National Park, Poland — biosphere reserve partner.
- Western Carpathians Ranges
- List of national parks of Slovakia
