= Trampling =

Effect of repeated walking on open ground

Trampling is the act of walking on something repeatedly by humans or animals.

Trampling on open ground can destroy the above ground parts of many plants and can compact the soil, thereby creating a distinct microenvironment that specific species may be adapted for, causing a disturbance to ecology and to archaeological sites. It can be used as part of a wildlife management strategy along grazing. When carrying out investigations like a belt transect, trampling should be avoided. At other times, it is part of the experimental design.

Studies of recreational trampling in alpine environments have found that repeated foot traffic can reduce vegetation cover and height, shift species composition, and damage soils through compaction (raising bulk density and reducing porosity), which can alter soil moisture and temperature regimes and increase surface runoff and erosion. In a simulated trampling experiment in the limestone Belianske Tatras (Slovakia), researchers applied controlled numbers of foot passes to plots in three native alpine plant communities in 2008 and re-tested the same sites after regeneration in 2022. They found that "recovered" communities could appear slightly more resistant while having already lost some moss, lichen, and vascular plant species years after the earlier disturbance, indicating that trampling impacts may be delayed and that apparent recovery can mask biodiversity loss; they also reported that the resistance of individual species varied between communities and with trampling intensity.
