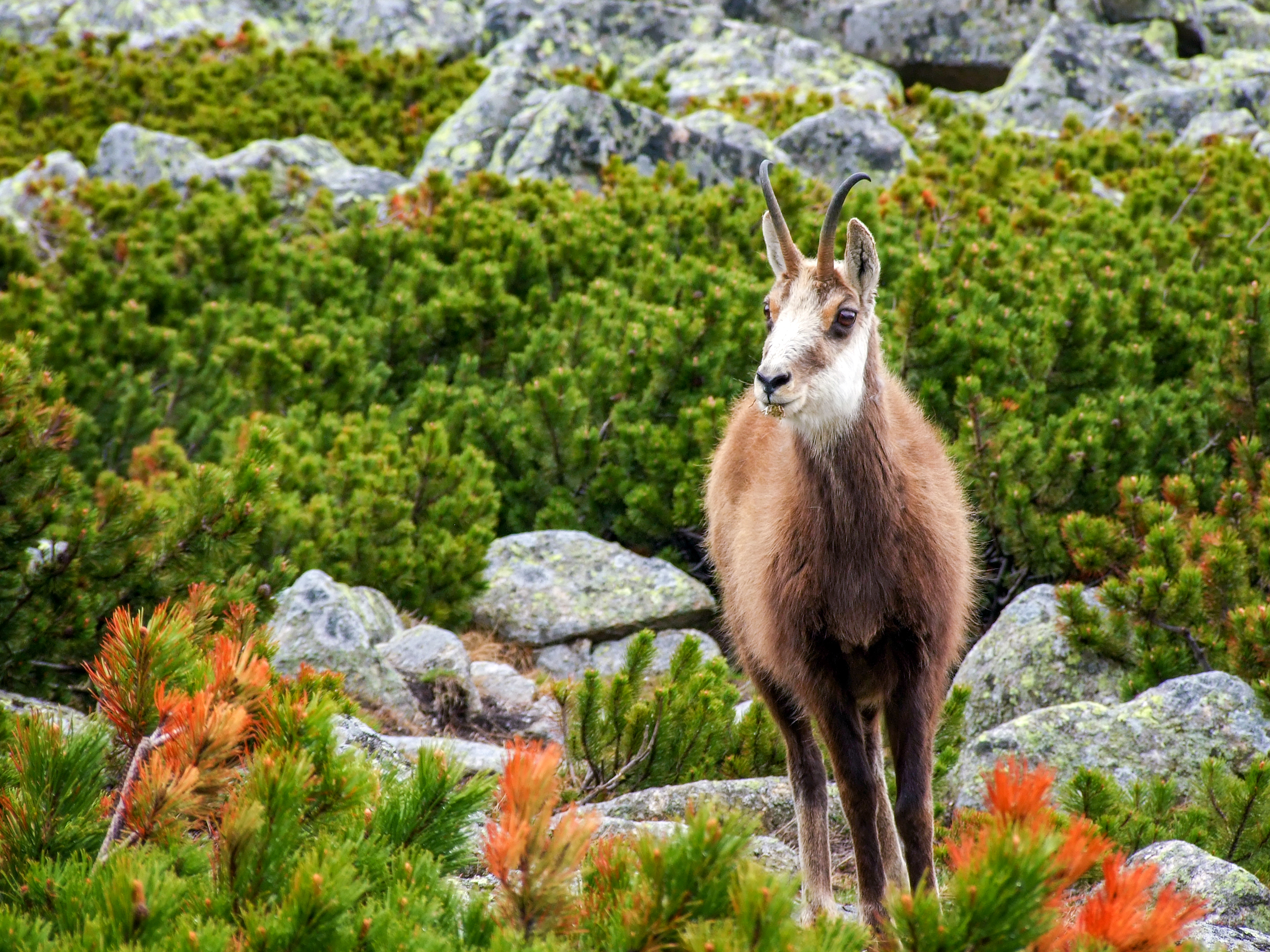

Conservation status
- Endangered (IUCN 3.1)

Scientific classification
- Kingdom: Animalia
- Phylum: Chordata
- Class: Mammalia
- Order: Artiodactyla
- Family: Bovidae
- Subfamily: Caprinae
- Genus: Rupicapra
- Species: R. rupicapra
- Subspecies: R. r. tatrica

Trinomial name
- Rupicapra rupicapra tatrica (Blahout, 1971/1972)

= Tatra chamois =

Subspecies of mammal

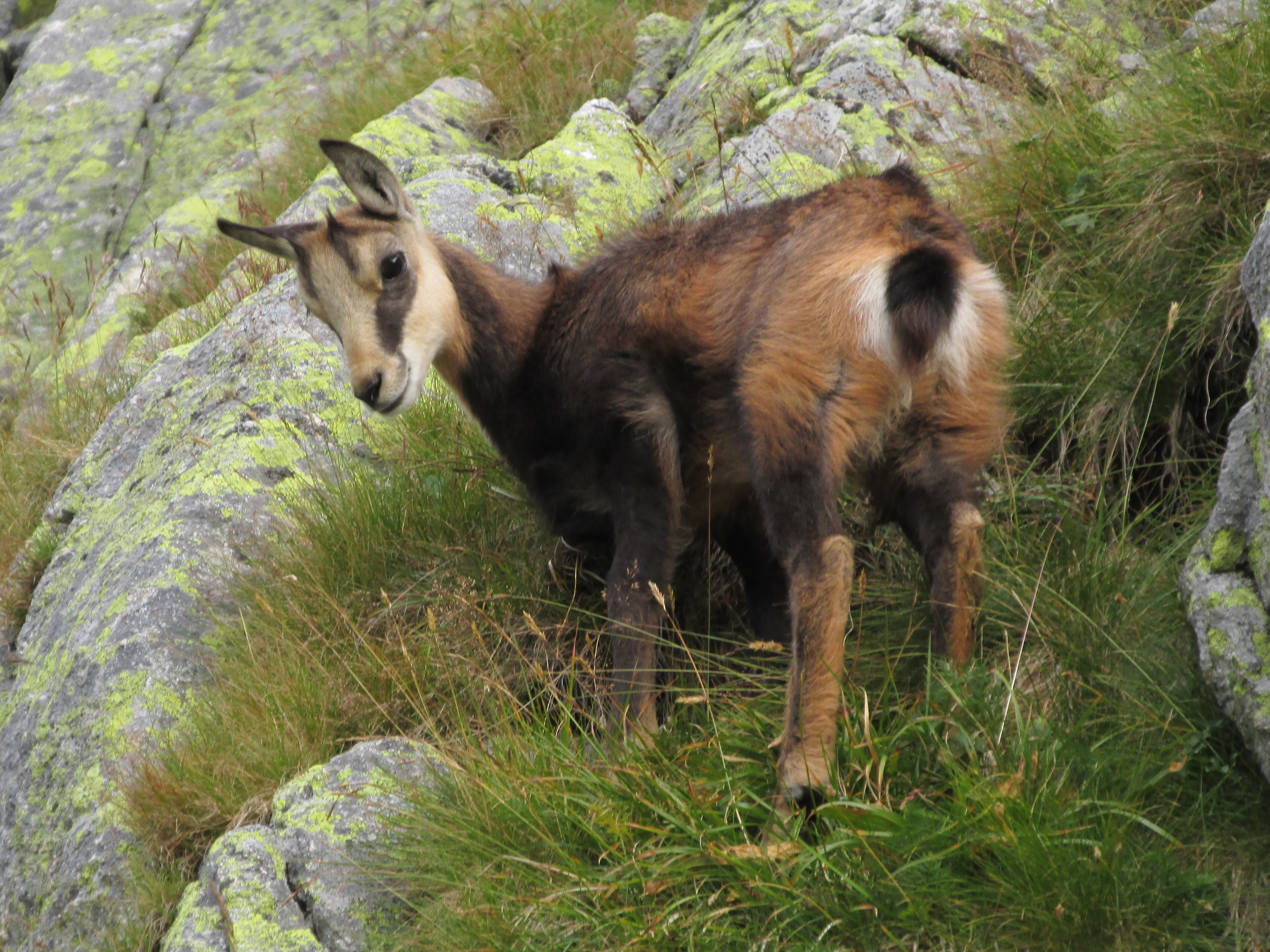
A young Tatra chamois

The Tatra chamois (Rupicapra rupicapra tatrica; Slovak: Kamzík vrchovský tatranský; Polish: Kozica tatrzańska) is a subspecies of the chamois of the genus Rupicapra. Tatra chamois live in the Tatra Mountains in Poland and Slovakia.

== Population and distribution ==
The Tatra chamois live in all parts of the Tatras: in the Western Tatras (Slovakia and Poland) and in the Eastern Tatras, the latter consisting the High Tatras (Slovakia and Poland) and the Belianske Tatras (Slovakia), all protected by national parks in both countries. Joint Slovak-Polish monitoring of the chamois population has been carried out continuously since 1959.

The population has undergone several troughs and peaks, with the most noticeable troughs occurring during both world wars. The largest population in the 20th century was recorded in the year 1964, when as much as 940 individuals were counted in the Slovak region of the Tatras. Subsequently, the population declined steadily to the lowest recorded numbers in history at the end of the century. During the years 1999-2000 numbers dropped below 200 individuals, which is considered a critical population size for the long-term survival of the subspecies.

A 5-year programme to save the Tatra chamois started in 2001, focusing on preserving its environment - especially during the mating season - by strict regulation of tourism and suppression of poaching. The population started to recover, and by 2006, the Slovak Tatra National Park was home to 371 chamois, of which 72 were lambs, and the Polish Tatra National Park was home to 117 chamois, of which 27 were lambs. As of 2010, a population recovered to 841 chamois, of which 74 were lambs, 699 (57 lambs) in Slovakia and 142 (17 lambs) in Poland, which is near the peak of 1964. The highest ever population was recorded in 2018, when 1,431 individuals were counted in Tatras. After that the population began to decline, and this trend became more pronounced from 2023.

Chamois population in the Tatras:
Year							1997	1998	1999	2000
Population							352	200	162	160
Year	2001	2002	2003	2004	2005	2006	2007	2008	2009	2010
Population	205	333	345	422	486	488	532	701	720	841
Year	2011	2012	2013	2014	2015	2016	2017	2018	2019	2020
Population	929	1096	1186	1389	1345	1367	1263	1431	1367	983
Year	2021	2022	2023	2024	2025					
Population	1095	1222	926	949	805					

Census results:

=== Low Tatras ===
Because of concerns about survivability in its native range, the Tatra chamois was also reintroduced into the Low Tatras mountains, situated south of the Tatras, between 1969 and 1976, to create a reserve population there. Chamois skull and skeletal fragments found in caves suggest that the species was present in this mountain range a few thousand years ago. The reintroduction involved 30 individuals and was successful as the population grew to a stable 100-130 individuals.

However, recent DNA studies have shown that the Low Tatras population crossbred with Alpine chamois migrating from the Fatra mountains and the Slovak Paradise National Park. The Low Tatra chamois are no longer considered genetically pure and therefore cannot act as a reserve population for the Tatra chamois. The Alpine chamois were introduced into Slovakia for hunting purposes before the Tatra chamois were officially classified as a separate subspecies.
