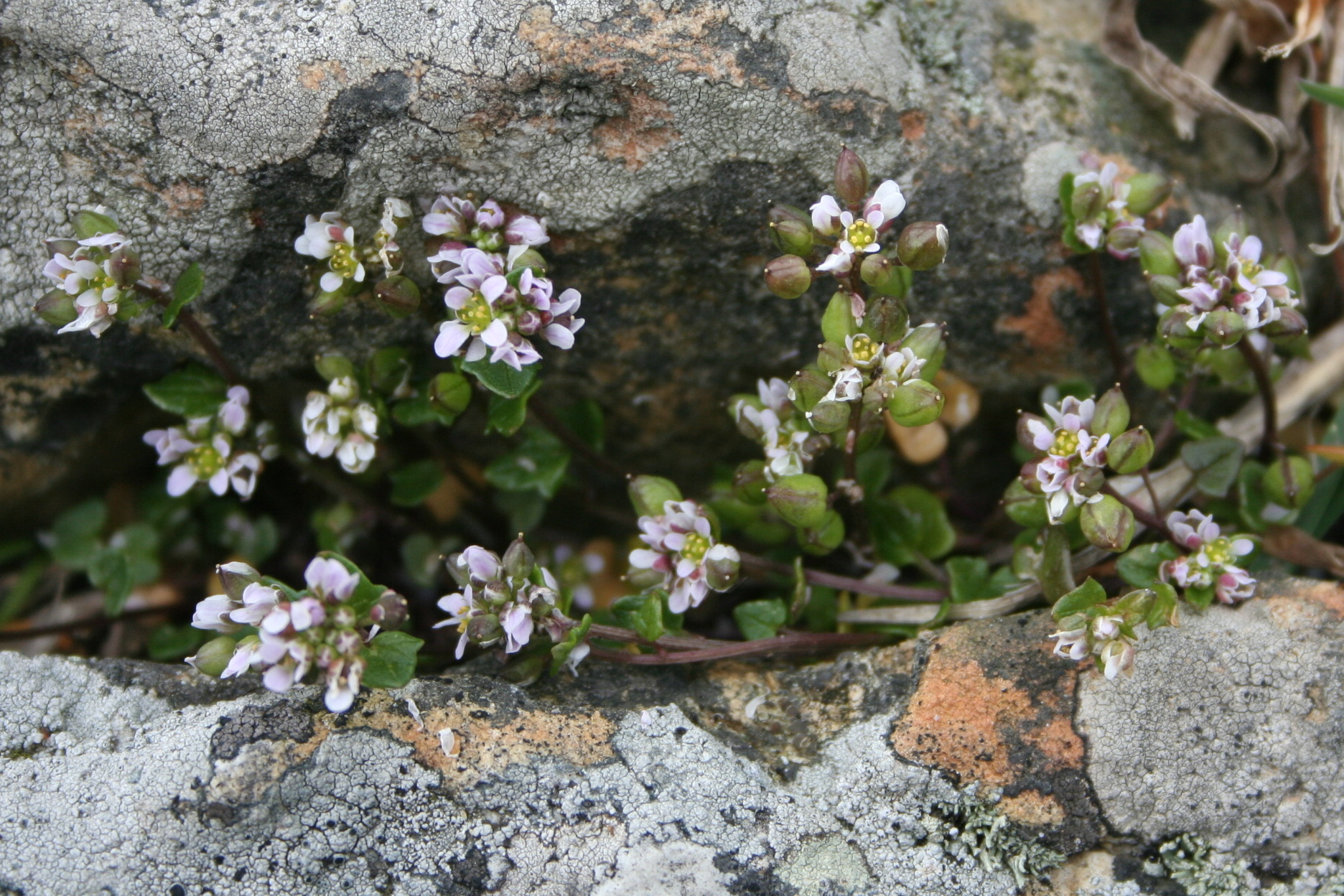

Scientific classification
- Kingdom: Plantae
- Clade: Tracheophytes
- Clade: Angiosperms
- Clade: Eudicots
- Clade: Rosids
- Order: Brassicales
- Family: Brassicaceae
- Genus: Cochlearia
- Species: C. danica

Binomial name
- Cochlearia danica L.

= Cochlearia danica =

Species of flowering plant

Cochlearia danica, or Danish scurvygrass, is a flowering plant of the genus Cochlearia in the family Brassicaceae.

A salt-tolerant (normally) coastal plant which is now flourishing along roads and motorways in Europe, especially under the crash barriers in the central reservation. Its success has been attributed to its ability to survive the effects of salts distributed by gritters in winter and its small seeds being spread by the high speed of cars in the fast lane.

Full of vitamin C, it gets its name from sailors chewing it to avoid scurvy. The mauve flowers are 4-5mm in diameter.

== Image gallery ==
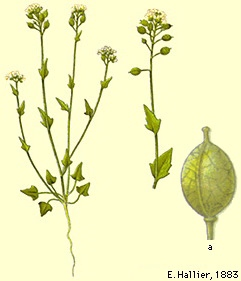
Cochlearia danica illustrated by E. Hallier 1883 .

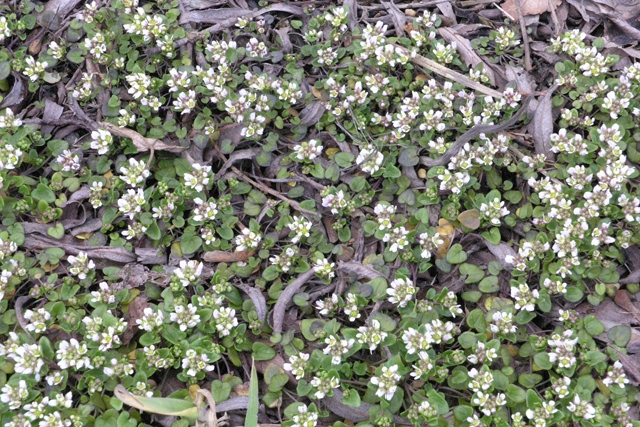
Scurvy-grass growing in the central reservation of the A1120 in the UK.

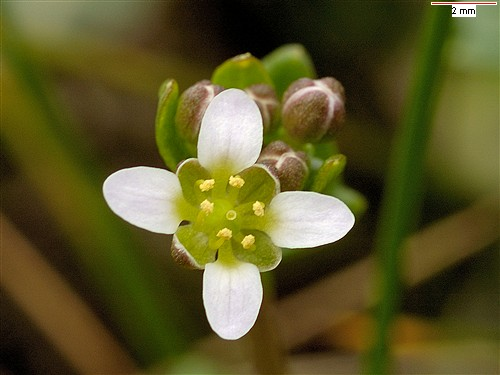
Cochlearia danica, flower

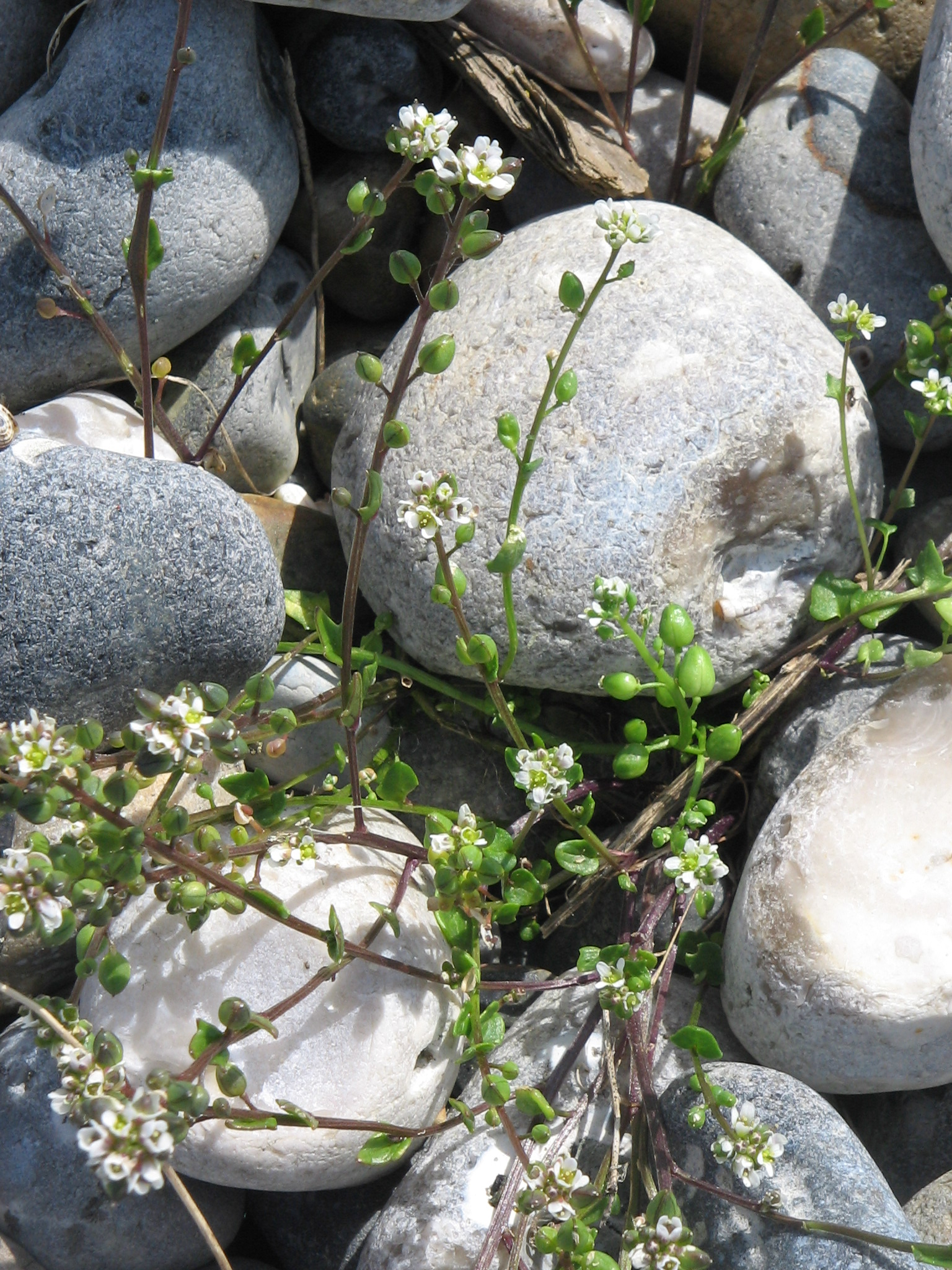
Cochlearia danica growing in its natural habitat, the shingle zone of a marine beach
