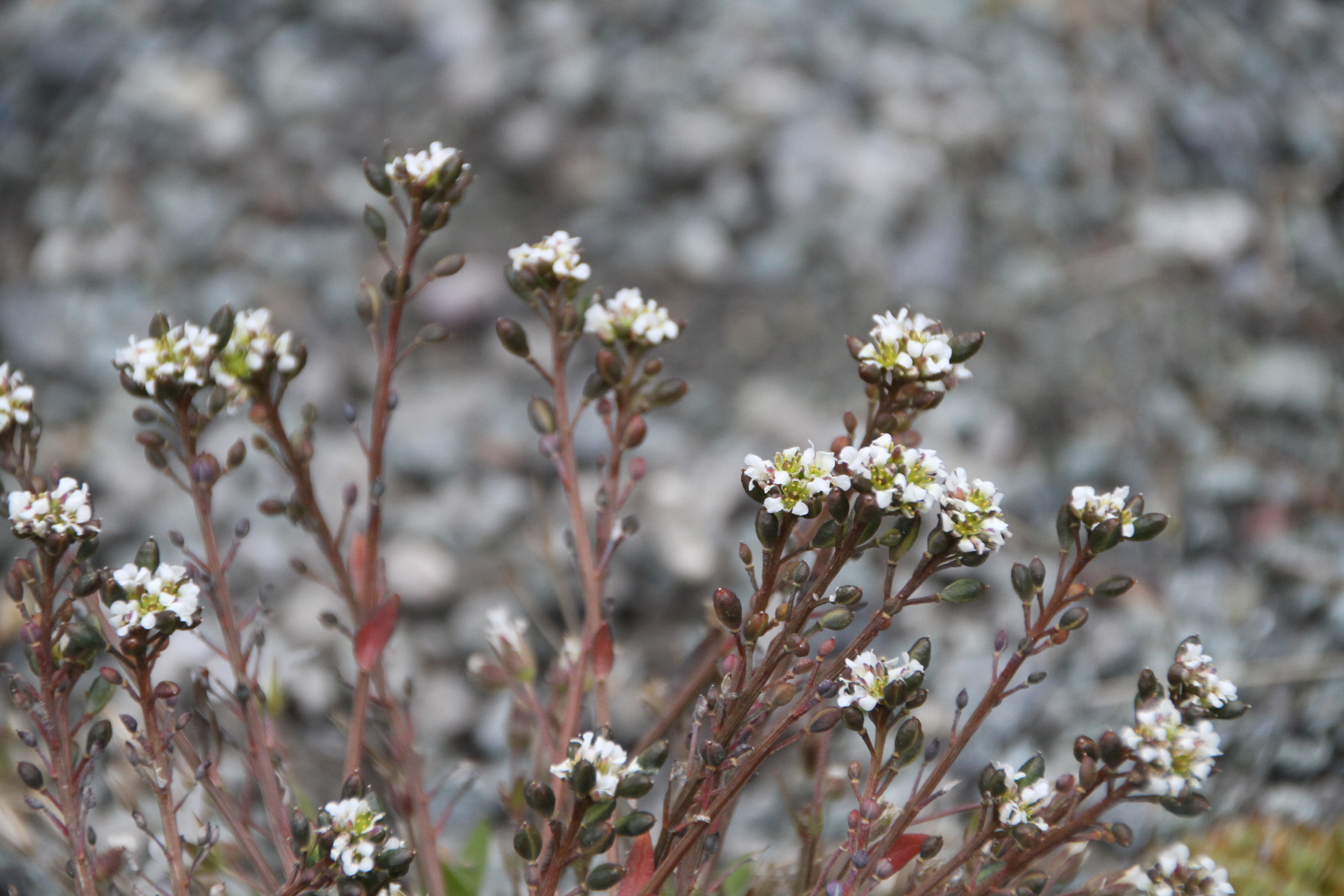

Scientific classification
- Kingdom: Plantae
- Clade: Tracheophytes
- Clade: Angiosperms
- Clade: Eudicots
- Clade: Rosids
- Order: Brassicales
- Family: Brassicaceae
- Genus: Cochlearia
- Species: C. groenlandica

Binomial name
- Cochlearia groenlandica L.

Synonyms
- Cochlearia officinalis subsp. groenlandica; Cochlearia officinalis var. groenlandica; Cochlearia rotundifolia var. alpina; Cochleariopsis groenlandica

= Cochlearia groenlandica =

Plant species in the cabbage family

Cochlearia groenlandica, known in English as polar scurvygrass or Greenland scurvy-grass, is a flowering plant of the scurvy-grass genus in the cabbage family.

== Description ==
Cochlearia groenlandica grows as a solitary plants, with a single root and a branched caudex at the surface of the ground. Plants live two to five years. First or second year plants have rosettes, circular arrangement of leaves, at ground level. Flowering occurs in the last year of life with the rosettes of leaves die, but stems remain until the seeds are fully ripe. Each plant sprouts a small number of stems, usually branched towards the ends, that range in size from 1 to 40 centimeters (0.4 to 15.7 in), though more typically 5 to 30 cm (2 to 12 in). The stems are may grow straight upwards or be decumbent, growing along the ground and only turning up at the ends.

The basal leaves are attached to the caudex by petioles, leaf stems that range from 0.2 to 10 centimeters in length. They are deltate to ovate in shape and 0.3 to 2.5 cm in length and just 0.2 to 2 cm wide. The cauline leaves, the leaves on the stems, are also on petioles, but become shorter or directly attached towards the ends. They are 0.4–2 cm by 0.1–1.5 cm.

The inflorescence is a raceme, an unbranched group of flowers attached by shorter stems to the main stem. The flowers have four petals and four sepals and are 3 to 6 millimeters in diameter. The petals are usually white, but may occasionally be pale violet. The plant flowers between June and August.

The seeds are numerous and germinate easily. Reproduction is only by seeds and the flowers are rarely visited by insects.

== Taxonomy ==
Cochlearia groenlandica was one of the species named by Linnaeus in 1753 in Species Plantarum. It has no accepted subspecies and is classified in the genus Cochlearia in the family Brassicaceae. It has 22 synonyms.

Table of Synonyms
Name	Year	Rank	Notes
Cochlearia arctica Schltdl. ex DC.	1821	species	= het.
Cochlearia arctica subsp. oblongifolia (DC.) V.V.Petrovsky	1975	subspecies	= het.
Cochlearia arctica var. oblongifolia (DC.) Trautv.	1847	variety	= het.
Cochlearia arctica var. wahlenbegiana Trautv.	1847	variety	= het.
Cochlearia fenestrata R.Br. ex DC.	1821	species	= het.
Cochlearia groenlandica subsp. islandica (Pobed.) Á.Löve	1970	subspecies	= het.
Cochlearia islandica Pobed.	1968	species	= het.
Cochlearia lenensis Adams ex Fisch.	1821	species	= het.
Cochlearia oblongifolia DC.	1821	species	= het.
Cochlearia officinalis subsp. arctica (Schltdl. ex DC.) Hultén	1928	subspecies	= het.
Cochlearia officinalis subsp. groenlandica (L.) A.E.Porsild	1957	subspecies	≡ hom.
Cochlearia officinalis subsp. oblongifolia (DC.) Hultén	1928	subspecies	= het.
Cochlearia officinalis var. arctica (Schltdl. ex DC.) Alef.	1866	variety	= het.
Cochlearia officinalis var. groenlandica (L.) Alef.	1866	variety	≡ hom., nom. superfl.
Cochlearia officinalis var. lenensis (Adams ex Fisch.) Alef.	1866	variety	= het.
Cochlearia officinalis var. oblongifolia (DC.) Gelert	1901	variety	= het.
Cochlearia polaris Pobed.	1970	species	= het.
Cochlearia rotundifolia var. alpina Gray	1821	variety	≡ hom.
Cochleariopsis groenlandica (L.) Á.Löve & D.Löve	1975	species	≡ hom.
Cochleariopsis groenlandica subsp. arctica (Schltdl. ex DC.) Á.Löve & D.Löve	1975	subspecies	= het.
Cochleariopsis groenlandica subsp. oblongifolia (DC.) Á.Löve & D.Löve	1975	subspecies	= het.
Draba cochlearioides Turcz. ex Besser	1834	species	= het.
Notes: ≡ homotypic synonym; = heterotypic synonym

=== Names ===
Cochlearia groenlandica is known by the common name polar scurvygrass, but is also called Greenland scurvy-grass or Danish scurvygrass.

== Range and habitat ==
The range of polar scurvygrass is circumpolar, present on all the lands around the Arctic Ocean, in all the major Arctic regions. Around the Arctic it is native to Canada, Greenland, Iceland, the Faroe Islands, Norway, Svalbard, Russia, and the United States. In the US it mainly grows in Alaska, but also grows on the Olympic Peninsula in Washington state, on sea bluffs in Coos and Curry counties Oregon, and on offshore rocks in the far north of California in Del Norte County. In Canada it is part of the flora of British Columbia, Labrador and Newfoundland, the Northwest Territories, Nunavut, Québec, and the Yukon. Away from the Arctic it also grows in parts of Japan.

It grows on open ground, typically beaches, tidal flats, gravelly or sandy ground and mud flat bird nesting sites.
