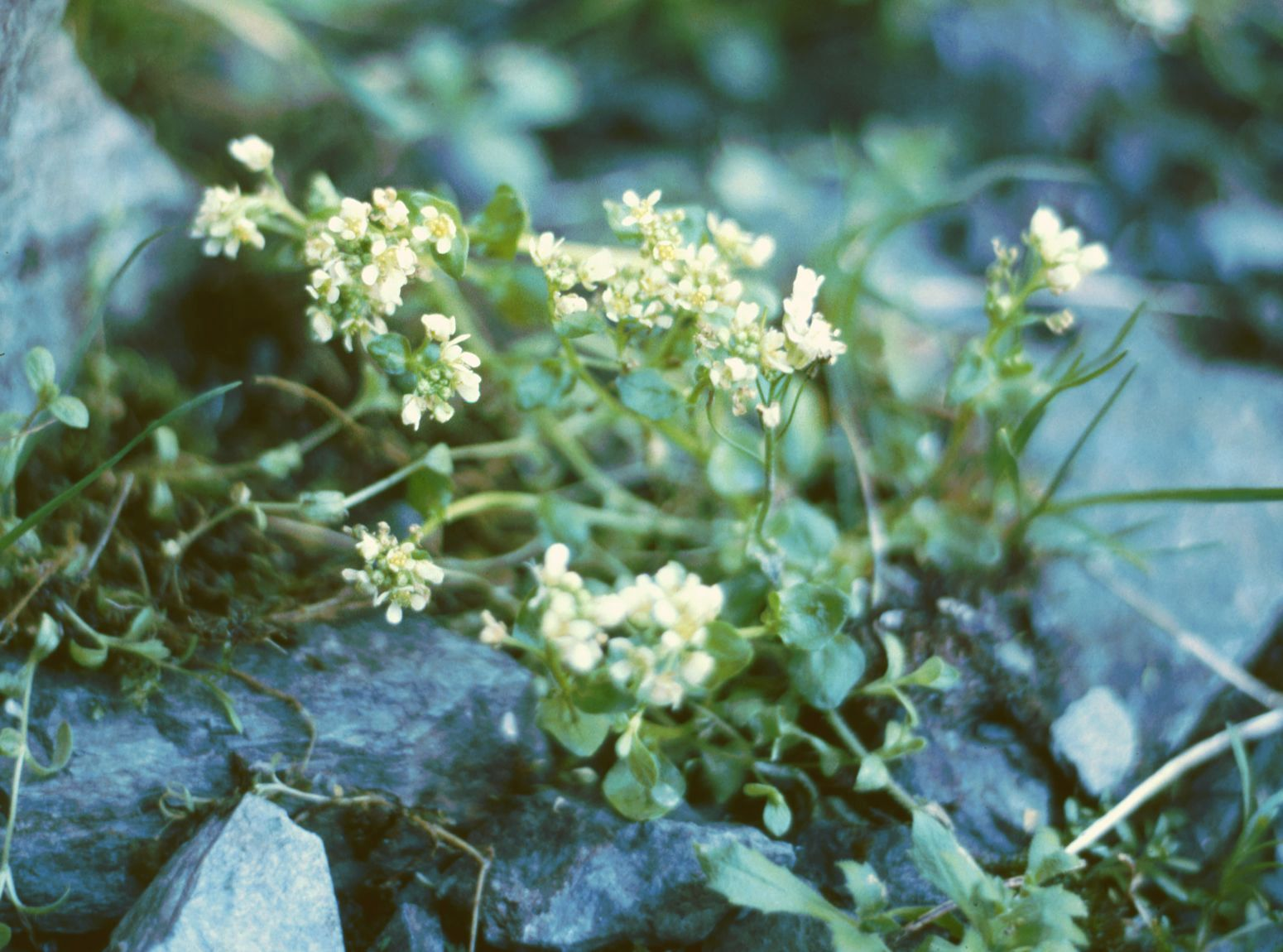
- Cochlearia officinalis subsp. pyrenaica

Scientific classification
- Kingdom: Plantae
- Clade: Tracheophytes
- Clade: Angiosperms
- Clade: Eudicots
- Clade: Rosids
- Order: Brassicales
- Family: Brassicaceae
- Genus: Cochlearia; L.

Species
- 15 species, see text

Synonyms
- Cochleariopsis Á.Löve & D.Löve; Glaucocochlearia (O.E.Schulz) Pobed.

= Cochlearia =

Scurvy-grass

Genus of flowering plants

Cochlearia (scurvy-grass or spoonwort) is a genus of about 30 species of annual and perennial herbs in the family Brassicaceae. They are widely distributed in temperate and arctic areas of the northern hemisphere, most commonly found in coastal regions, on cliff-tops and salt marshes where their high tolerance of salt enables them to avoid competition from larger, but less salt-tolerant plants; they also occur in alpine habitats in mountains and tundra.

They form low, rounded or creeping plants, typically 5–20 cm tall. The leaves are smoothly rounded, roughly spoon-shaped (the scientific name Cochlearia derives from the Latinized form, cocleare, of the Greek κοχλιάριον, kokhliárion, a spoon; this a diminutive of κόχλος, kókhlos, seashell), or in some species, lobed; typically 1–5 cm long, and with a fleshy texture. The flowers are white with four petals and are borne in short racemes.

== Species ==
15 species are accepted.

- Cochlearia aestuaria (J.Lloyd) Heywood – Estuarine scurvy-grass
- Cochlearia anglica L. – English scurvy-grass
- Cochlearia bavarica Vogt
- Cochlearia borzaeana (Coman & Nyár.) Pobed.
- Cochlearia danica L. – Early or Danish scurvy-grass
- Cochlearia groenlandica L. – Greenland scurvy-grass
- Cochlearia gurulkanii Yıld.
- Cochlearia × hollandica Henrard
- Cochlearia micacea E.S.Marshall
- Cochlearia officinalis L. – Common scurvy-grass
- Cochlearia polonica A.Fröhl.
- Cochlearia pyrenaica DC.
- Cochlearia scotica Druce
- Cochlearia sessilifolia Rollins – Sessile-leaved or Alaskan scurvy-grass
- Cochlearia tatrae Borbás
- Cochlearia tridactylites Banks ex DC. – Three-fingered scurvy-grass

Two species formerly included in the genus Cochlearia are now usually treated in separate genera:

- Horseradish Armoracia rusticana (previously Cochlearia armoracia)
- Wasabi Wasabia japonica (previously Cochlearia wasabi)

Cook's scurvy grass, Lepidium oleraceum, was used by James Cook to prevent scurvy, but is now almost extinct.

== History and uses ==
Scurvy-grass is edible raw and cooked, with a flavour similar to cress. The leaves are rich in vitamin C, which cures scurvy, a deficiency disease resulting from a lack of fresh vegetables in the diet. The plant was frequently eaten in the past by sailors suffering from scurvy after returning from long voyages. The first-century writer Pliny the Elder (A.D. 23–79) writes in his Naturalis Historia (Natural History) about a disease suffered by Roman soldiers in Germany. Their symptoms resemble those of scurvy, and Pliny recommends a Herba britannica, which has been suggested to be scurvy-grass.

The Rev. George Moore recorded the purchase of "a pint of scurvey-grasse" for 1 s in 1662. He apparently "suffered much" from scurvy, purchasing scurvey-grasse in both bundled and bottled form. The book Cochlearia curiosa: or the curiosities of scurvygrass was published in English in 1676, Described as "both a learned and accurate work", it was well received, and apparently brought scurvy-grass "into great repute" as a remedy. According to the Royal Society, the book contains "not only a description of the several kinds of this plant, with its several names, place, and time of growth, temperature and general vertues, but also an enumeration of the uses, medicinal vertues and manner of applying each part of this plant." In 1857, Cochlearia officinalis was described in The Elements of Materia Medica and Therapeutics as "A gentle stimulant, aperient, and diuretic. It has long been esteemed as an antiscorbutic. It has also been used in visceral obstructions. It is occasionally eaten with bread and butter, like the water-cress."

The leaves, which have a strong acrid, bitter, or peppery taste similar to the related horseradish and watercress, are also sometimes used in salads or eaten with bread and butter.

Scurvy-grass sorrel (Oxalis enneaphylla) is an unrelated plant from southern South America and the Falkland Islands that was also used to treat scurvy.

== Scurvy-grass and roads ==
The advent of modern fast roads treated with salt in winter for ice clearance has resulted in the colonisation by scurvy-grass of many inland areas where it formerly did not occur. The scurvy-grass seeds become trapped on car wheels, transported often for a considerable distance, and then washed off, to grow in the salt-rich soil at the side of the road where other plants cannot survive.

Cochlearia officinalis on Bear Island, Norway

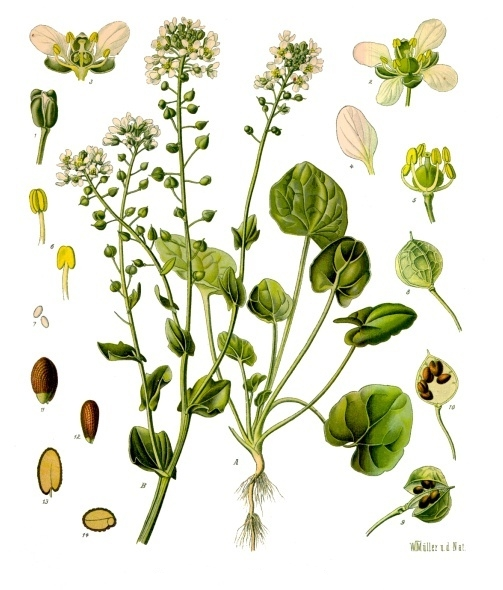
19th century illustration of Cochlearia officinalis

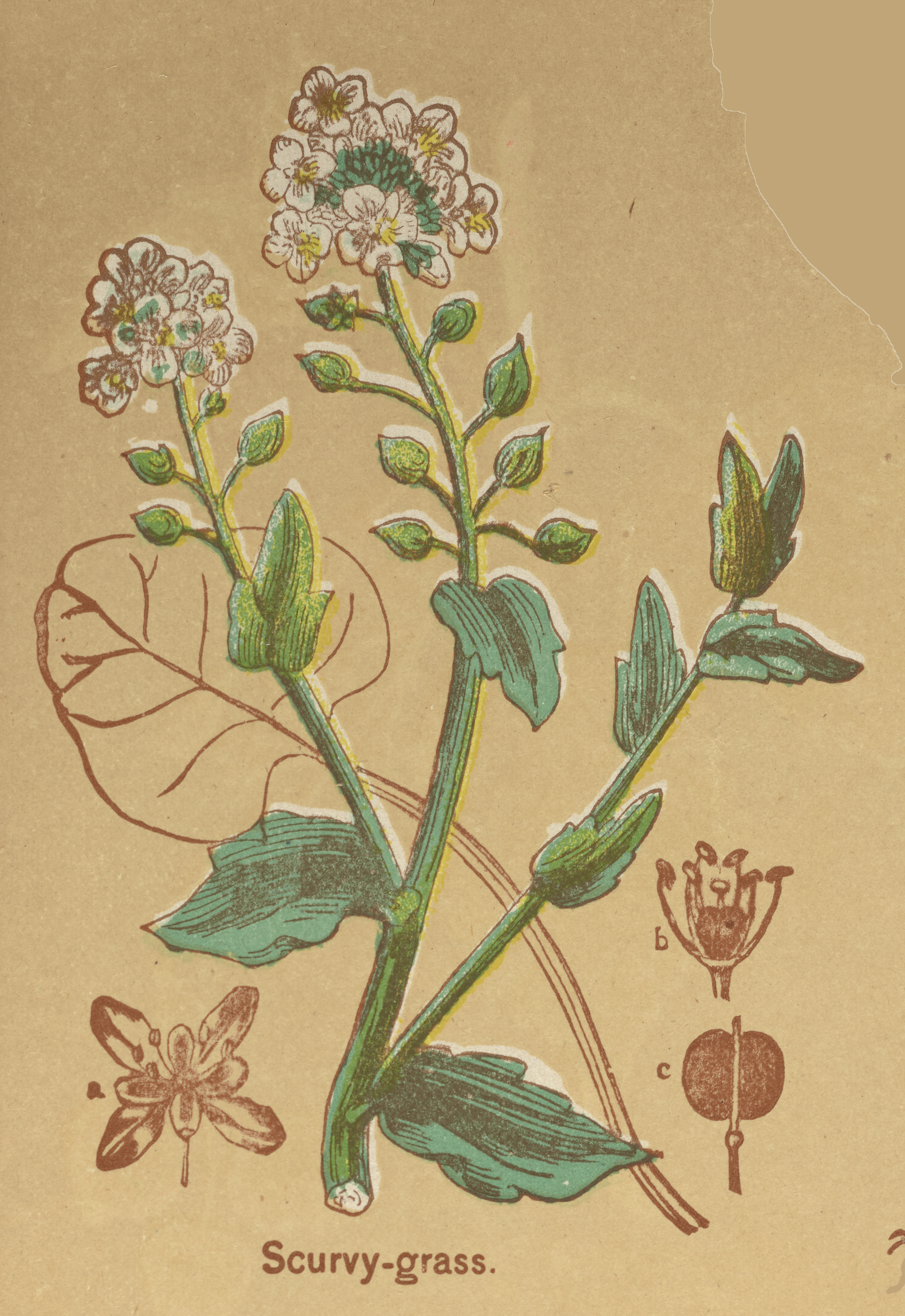
"Scurvy-grass" from The Book of Health, 1898, by Henry Munson Lyman
