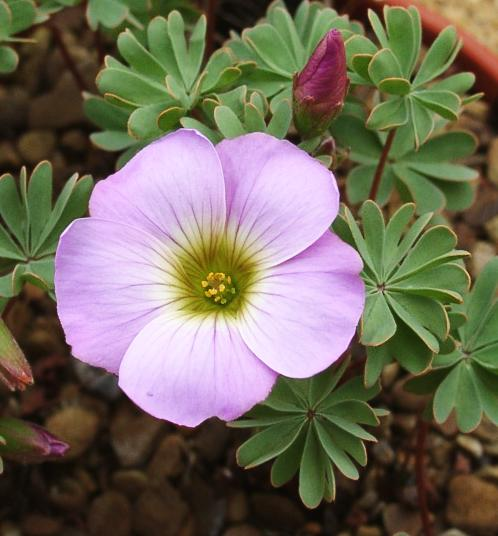

Scientific classification
- Kingdom: Plantae
- Clade: Tracheophytes
- Clade: Angiosperms
- Clade: Eudicots
- Clade: Rosids
- Order: Oxalidales
- Family: Oxalidaceae
- Genus: Oxalis
- Species: O. enneaphylla

Binomial name
- Oxalis enneaphylla Cav.

= Oxalis enneaphylla =

Species of flowering plant

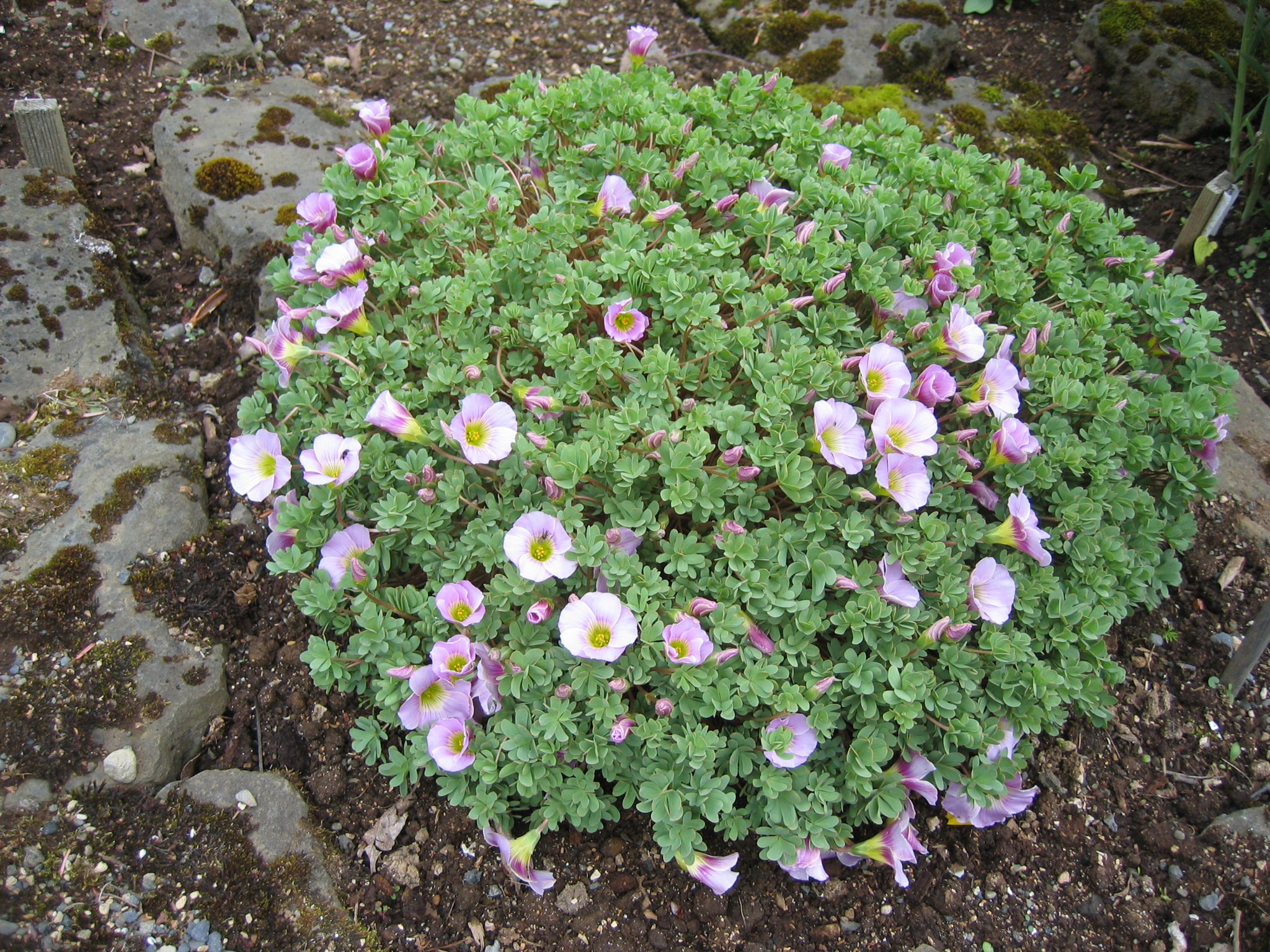

Oxalis enneaphylla, or scurvy grass, is a late spring- and summer-flowering, rhizomatous, alpine perennial herbaceous plant native to the grasslands of Patagonia in Southern Chile and Argentina, and the Falkland Islands. It is a small plant that grows to 7 cm (2.8 in) high and 10 cm (3.9 in) across, with slightly fleshy, hairy, blue-grey leaves, which are edible but have a sharp taste due to their high oxalic acid content. The name enneaphylla comes from the Greek εννεα (ennea), "nine" and φυλλον (phyllon), "leaf".

The almond-scented, five-petalled flowers are pink shading to white. They are hermaphrodite and pollinated by Lepidoptera (moths and butterflies).

The plant gets its common name "scurvy grass" from the fact that its leaves are rich in vitamin C. It is not closely related to the other plant known as scurvy-grass (Cochlearia), nor is either plant a grass (Poaceae).

Sailors travelling around Cape Horn would consume the leaves to avoid scurvy. This is illustrated by this extract from the Journal of Syms Covington, who sailed aboard HMS Beagle with Charles Darwin. Here he describes the Falkland Islands, and refers to Oxalis enneaphylla as "wild thyme":

While laying here we found it very squally, and at times very cold. The island is in general mountainous. Not a single tree to be seen but there are low brushes with red berries which are very good eating. Here are bullocks horses and pigs that run wild, rabbits, wild geese and ducks and most excellent snipe shooting on the marshy ground and long grass, of which the island in general has very little else. Likewise there is the tea plant, which bears very sweet berry, and wild thyme which we used as tea, and is very good and much more plentiful than the former.

This plant is cultivated in temperate regions, and is suitable for rockeries or alpine gardens. The species and the hybrid cultivar 'Ione Hecker' have gained the Royal Horticultural Society's Award of Garden Merit.

== Bibliography ==
- Sheader, Martin & Sheader, Anna-Liisa (2015). "Patagonian alpines". The Plantsman. New Series. 14 (1): 16–21.
