= Belianske Tatras =

Mountain range of Slovakia within the Eastern Tatras mountain range

- Slovak: Belianske Tatry
- Muráň, Nový, Havran, Ždiarska Vidla peaks – beginning from the left

Highest point
- Elevation: 2,151.5 m (7,059 ft)

Geography
- Location within Slovakia
- Country: Slovakia
- Region: Prešov
- District: Poprad
- Range coordinates: 49°14.3′N 20°13.3′E
- Parent range: Eastern Tatras

Belianske Tatras (Slovak: Belianske Tatry, Slovak pronunciation: [ˈbelɪɐnske ˈtatri]) is a mountain range in the Eastern Tatras of North Central Slovakia. The Eastern Tatras are part of the Tatra Mountains, which are part of the Inner Western Carpathians.

The highest point is Havran at 2,151.5 metres (7,059 ft). Like most of the area, the peak is not accessible for tourists to protect the rare animals and plants. The first inhabitants were shepherds in the 14th century.

The main 14 km long ridge contains mountains built of limestone and dolomite with distinctive karst topography. One of just a few caves in the Tatras open to public – Belianska Cave – is located here.

== Ecology and biology ==
The whole area is a national nature reserve covering 54.08 km^{2} (20.9 mi^{2}), which is part of Tatra National Park. Many endemic, rare and endangered species live or grow here.

The northern parts of the Belianske Tatras are home to the largest population of the Tatra chamois, which is endemic to the Tatras. The typical flower of the mountains is Edelweiss.

== External links and references ==
- Slovak Caves Administration — Belianske Tatras and Belianska Cave
- BelianskeTatry.sk: Photos (in Slovak)
