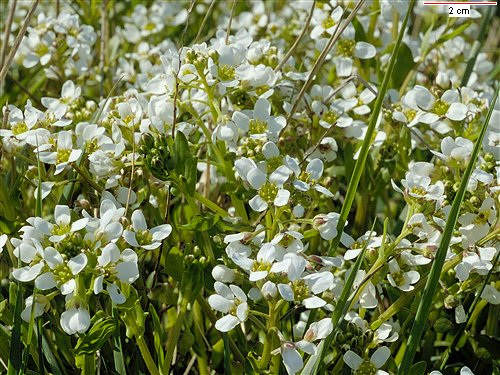

Scientific classification
- Kingdom: Plantae
- Clade: Tracheophytes
- Clade: Angiosperms
- Clade: Eudicots
- Clade: Rosids
- Order: Brassicales
- Family: Brassicaceae
- Genus: Cochlearia
- Species: C. anglica

Binomial name
- Cochlearia anglica L.

= Cochlearia anglica =

Species of flowering plant

Cochlearia anglica is a species of flowering plant in the family Brassicaceae known by the common names English scurvygrass and long-leaved scurvy grass. It is a plant of the coastlines of Europe, especially the British Isles. It is edible, and as its name suggests, it is rich in vitamin C. It has spade-shaped leaves and white flowers.
