= Eastern Tatras =

Coordinates: 49.172°N 20.142°E

The Eastern Tatras form part of the European Tatra Mountains range in Poland and Slovakia.

The term is rarely used, with the area more commonly referred to as the High Tatras and the Belianske Tatras (Slovak: Belianske Tatry) ranges.

== See also ==
- Western Tatras
- Tatra National Park, Slovakia
- Tatra National Park, Poland
