= Belianska Cave =

Cave in Slovakia

- Belianska jaskyňa
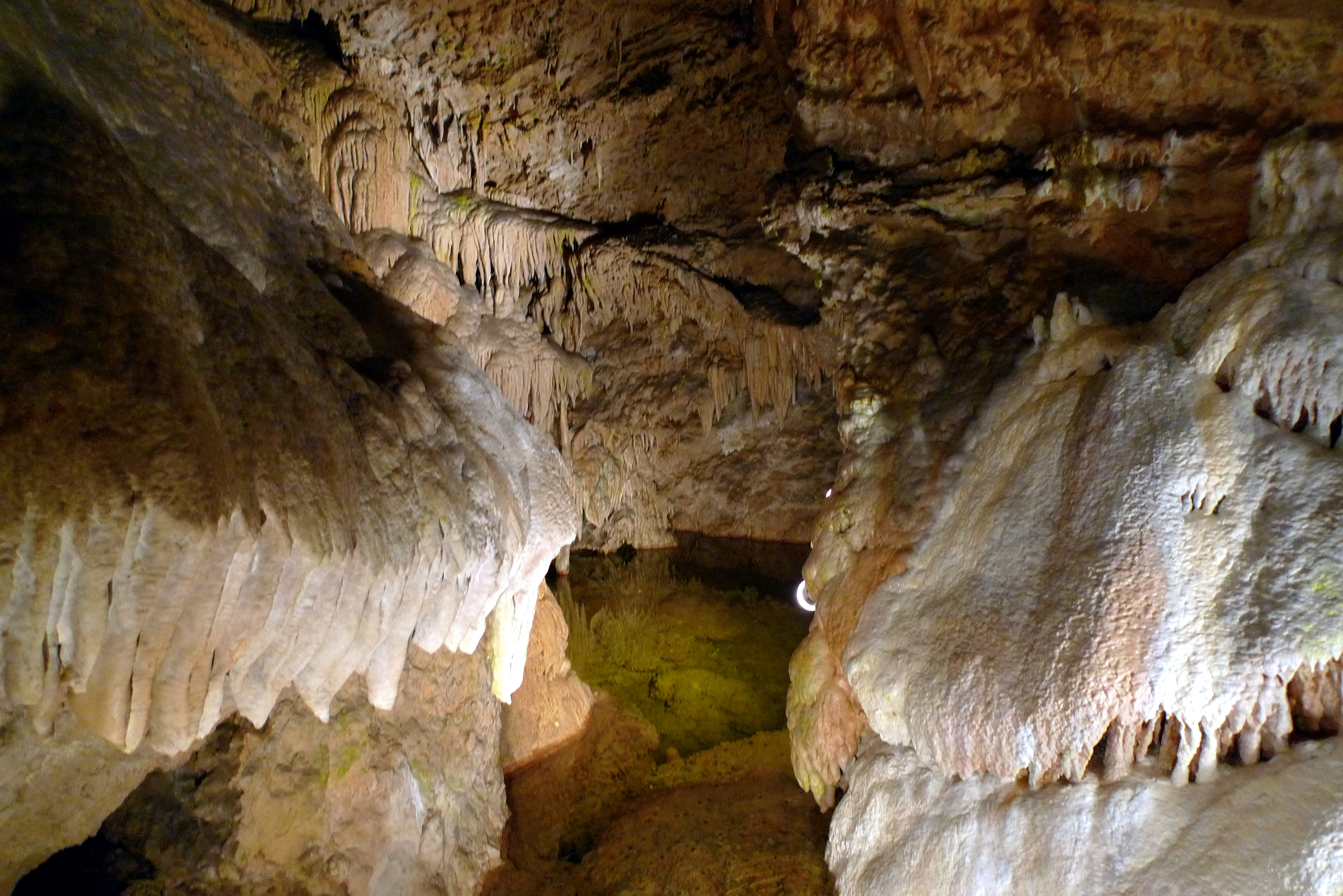

- Location within Slovakia
- Location: Tatranská Kotlina, Lendak, Slovakia
- Coordinates: 49°13′33″N 20°18′48″E
- Length: 3,641 m (11,946 ft)
- Discovery: 18th century
- Access: by foot

Belianska Cave (Slovak: Belianska jaskyňa, pronounced [ˈbelɪɐnska ˈjaskiɲa]) is a stalactite cave in the Slovak part of the Tatra Mountains, the largest and the only one open to the public in the Slovak Tatras. It is located above the settlement of Tatranská Kotlina, which is a part of the town of Vysoké Tatry.

The cave was discovered in the 18th century, although it is presumed that it was used by pre-historic people. The cave was opened in 1884 and electrically lit in 1896.

Entrance to the cave is located at an altitude of 890 metres. The cave is 3,641 m long, with two circuits available to the visitors, with the longer one having the length of 1,752 m.
