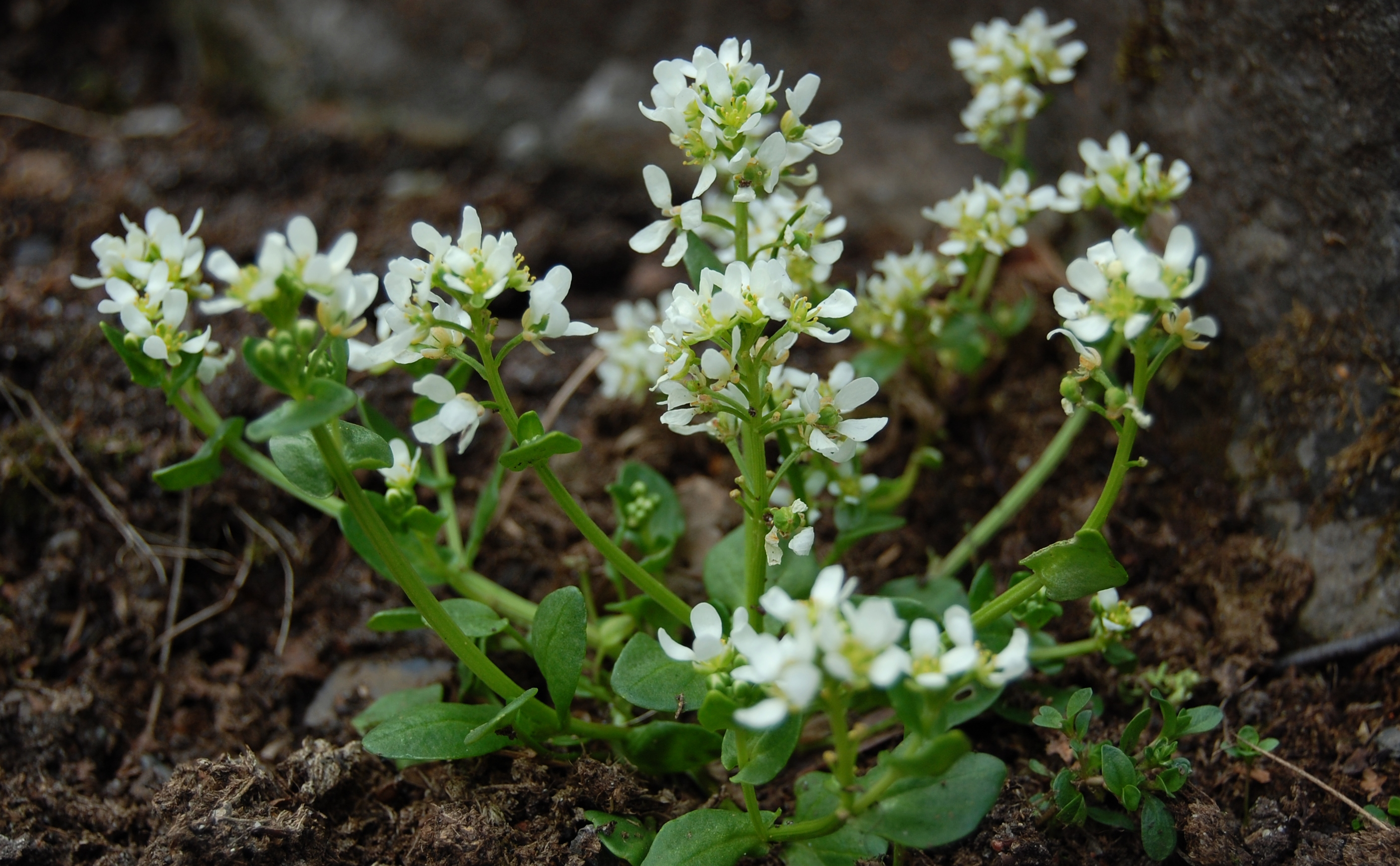

Conservation status
- Vulnerable (IUCN 3.1)

Scientific classification
- Kingdom: Plantae
- Clade: Tracheophytes
- Clade: Angiosperms
- Clade: Eudicots
- Clade: Rosids
- Order: Brassicales
- Family: Brassicaceae
- Genus: Cochlearia
- Species: C. tatrae

Binomial name
- Cochlearia tatrae Borbás

= Cochlearia tatrae =

Species of plant

Cochlearia tatrae, the Tatra scurvy-grass, is a flowering plant of the genus Cochlearia in the family Brassicaceae. The plant is endemic to and named after the Tatra Mountains, which in northern Slovakia and southern Poland.

The plant blooms from April to September.

== Distribution ==
The species is a subnival (upper alpine dwarf scrub) and alpine plant. It is found in moist rock scree and crevices, and around springs and streams.

In Poland the plant is restricted to a dozen sites in the Morskie Oko Lake area of the High Tatra Mountains, at 1,595–2,390 metres (5,233–7,841 ft) in elevation. The population is estimated at 600 individuals. In Slovakia the populations are found in thirty sites, at elevations up to 2,605 metres (8,547 ft). It is found on Mięguszowiecki Szczyt Mountain (Slovak: Veľký Mengusovský štít), which is on the Slovak-Polish border.

Cochlearia tatrae is an IUCN Red List vulnerable species.
