= Lendak =

- Municipality
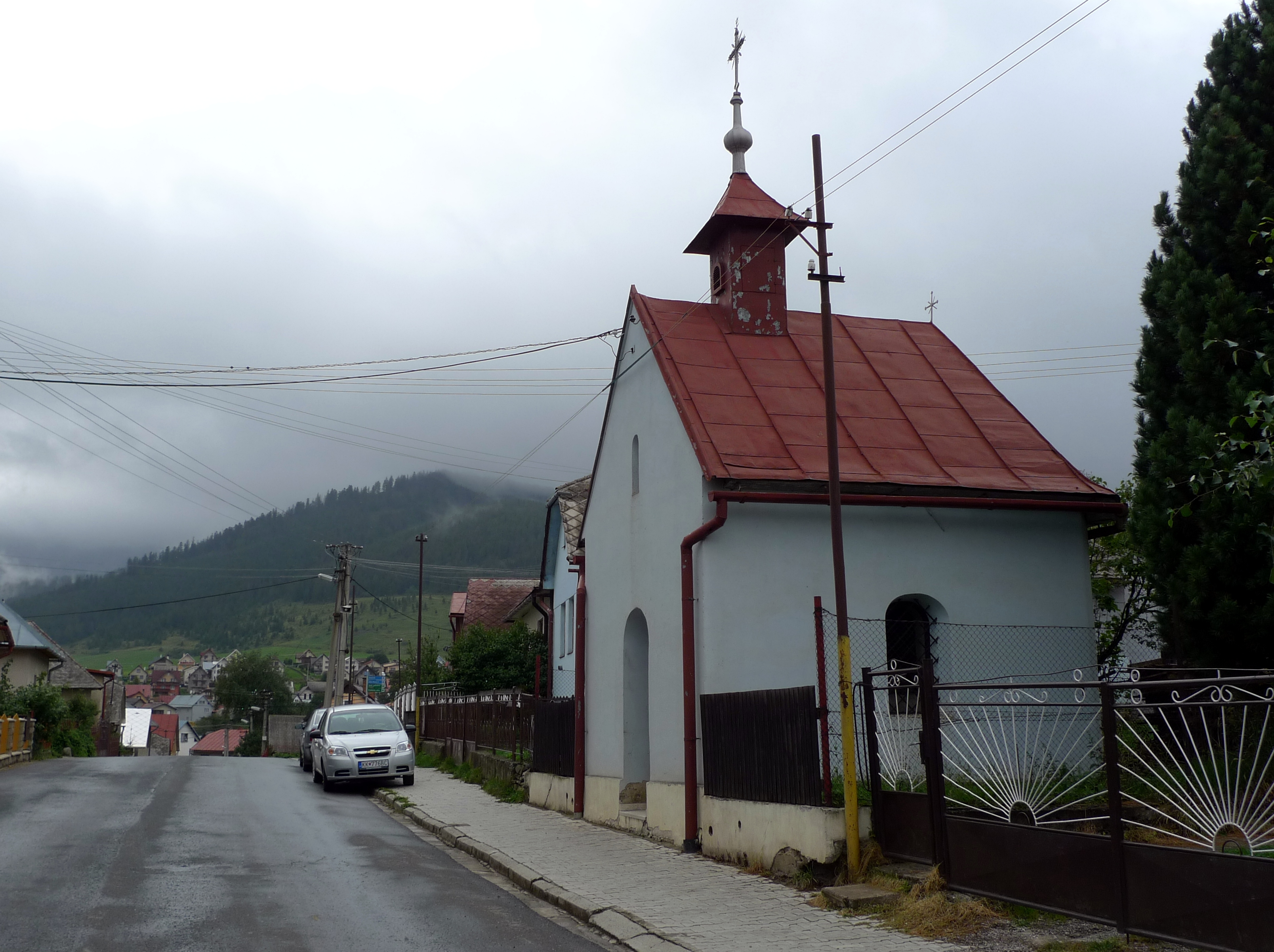
- Chapel in Lendak, view on the village

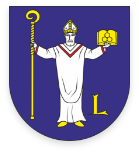
- Flag Coat of arms

- Location of Lendak in the Prešov Region Location of Lendak in Slovakia
- Coordinates: 49.24°N 20.36°E
- Country: Slovakia
- Region: Prešov Region
- District: Kežmarok District
- First mentioned: 1288

Area
  - Total: 19.65 km^{2} (7.59 sq mi)
- Elevation: 744 m (2,441 ft)

Population (2025)
  - Total: 5,689
- Time zone: UTC+1 (CET)
  - Summer (DST): UTC+2 (CEST)
- Postal code: 590 7
- Area code: +421 52
- Vehicle registration plate (until 2022): KK
- Website: www.lendak.sk

Lendak (Hungarian: Lándok, German: Landeck, Goral: Ľyndak, Rusyn: Лендак) is a village and municipality in Kežmarok District in the Prešov Region of north Slovakia. It is inhabited by Gorals

== Geography ==
The municipality lies at an altitude of 744 metres (2,441 ft) and covers an area of 19.65 km^{2} (7.59 sq mi) (2025).

== History ==
In historical records the village was first mentioned in 1288. Before the establishment of independent Czechoslovakia in 1918, Lendak was part of Szepes County within the Kingdom of Hungary. From 1939 to 1945, it was part of the Slovak Republic. On 27 January 1945, the Red Army dislodged the Wehrmacht from Lendak in the course of the Western Carpathian offensive and it was once again part of Czechoslovakia.

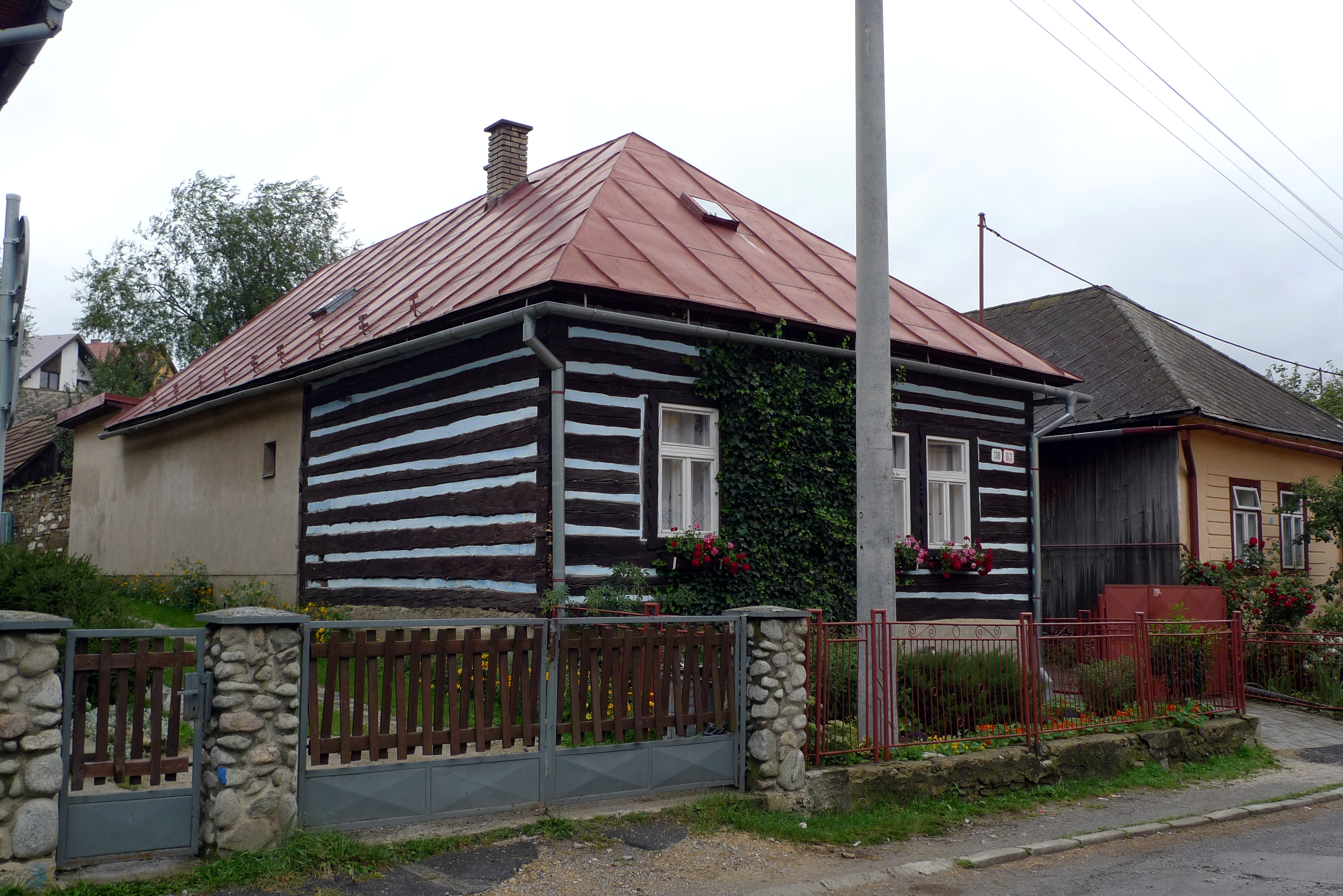
Typical folk architecture in Lendak

== Population ==
Population statistic (10 years)
Year	1995	2005	2015	2025
Count	4122	4684	5195	5689
Difference		+13.63%	+10.90%	+9.50%

Population statistic
Year	2024	2025
Count	5634	5689
Difference		+0.97%

It has a population of 5689 people (31 December 2025).

=== Ethnicity ===
Census 2021 (1+ %)
Ethnicity	Number	Fraction
Slovak	5373	99.33%
Not found out	588	10.87%
Total	5409	

In year 2021 was 5409 people by ethnicity 5373 as Slovak, 588 as Not found out, 21 as Other, 14 as Polish, 11 as Czech, 3 as German, 2 as Ukrainian, 2 as Rusyn, 1 as Russian and 1 as Hungarian.

Note on population: The difference values of population numbers in the table "Population statistic" and in the sections "Ethnicity" & "Religion" is caused by the use of various statistical methods.

=== Religion ===
Census 2021 (1+ %)
Religion	Number	Fraction
Roman Catholic Church	5255	97.15%
None	68	1.26%
Total	5409	

In year 2021 was 5409 people by religion 5255 from Roman Catholic Church, 68 from None, 26 from Not found out, 18 from Greek Catholic Church, 15 from Christian Congregations in Slovakia, 9 from Calvinist Church, 4 from Evangelical Church, 4 from Ad hoc movements, 2 from Eastern Orthodox Church, 2 from Other and not ascertained christian church, 1 from Old Catholic Church, 1 from Paganism and natural spirituality, 1 from Jehovah's Witnesses, 1 from Islam, 1 from Other and 1 from Apostolic Church.
